= Turbonilla coomansi =

Scientific classification
- Kingdom: Animalia
- Phylum: Mollusca
- Class: Gastropoda
- Family: Pyramidellidae
- Genus: Turbonilla
- Species: T. coomansi

Binomial name
- Turbonilla coomansi van Aartsen, 1994

Synonyms
- Chemnitzia pusilla C. B. Adams, 1850; Pyrgiscus minor (Bush, 1899); Turbonilla adamsi Cossmann, 1912; Turbonilla minor Bush, 1899

Species of gastropod

Turbonilla coomansi is a species of sea snail, a marine gastropod mollusk in the family Pyramidellidae, the pyrams and their allies.

== Distribution ==
This marine species occurs in the following locations at depths between 0 m and 538 m:

- Caribbean Sea : Colombia, Costa Rica, Jamaica
- Gulf of Mexico: Louisiana, Texas
- Atlantic Ocean : Brazil
