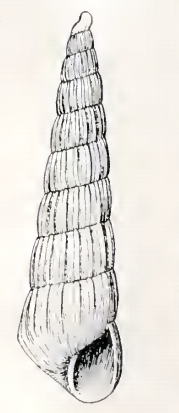
- Drawing of a shell of Turbonilla halibrecta

Scientific classification
- Kingdom: Animalia
- Phylum: Mollusca
- Class: Gastropoda
- Family: Pyramidellidae
- Genus: Turbonilla
- Species: T. halibrecta

Binomial name
- Turbonilla halibrecta Dall & Bartsch, 1909

Synonyms
- Turbonilla (Pyrgolampros) halibrecta Dall & Bartsch, 1909

= Turbonilla halibrecta =

Species of gastropod

Turbonilla halibrecta is a species of sea snail, a marine gastropod mollusk in the family Pyramidellidae, the pyrams and their allies.

== Description ==
The shell has an elongate-conic shape. Its length measures 6.2 mm. The two helicoid whorls of the protoconch are depressed. Their axis is at nearly right angles to that of the succeeding turns, in the first of which they are very slightly immersed. The nine whorls off the teleoconch are flattened in the middle, and slightly rounded toward the somewhat shouldered summit and the periphery. They are marked by strong, rounded, almost vertical axial ribs, of which there are 20 on the first to fifth, 18 upon the sixth, and 16 upon the remaining turns. The intercostal spaces are a little wider than the ribs, and well impressed. The sutures are strongly marked. The periphery of the body whorl is well rounded. It is marked by the feeble continuations of the axial ribs. The base of the shell is short, and well rounded. The entire surface of the spire and the base is marked by exceedingly fine, closely crowded, spiral striations. The oval aperture is rather small. The posterior angle is acute. The columella is short and curved.

== Distribution ==
The type specimen was found in the Pacific Ocean off Catalina Island, California.
