= Turbonilla indonesiae =

Scientific classification
- Kingdom: Animalia
- Phylum: Mollusca
- Class: Gastropoda
- Family: Pyramidellidae
- Genus: Turbonilla
- Species: T. indonesiae

Binomial name
- Turbonilla indonesiae van Aartsen & Corgan, 1996

Synonyms
- Turbonilla helena Thiele, 1925

Species of gastropod

Turbonilla indonesiae is a species of sea snail, a marine gastropod mollusk in the family Pyramidellidae, the pyrams and their allies.
