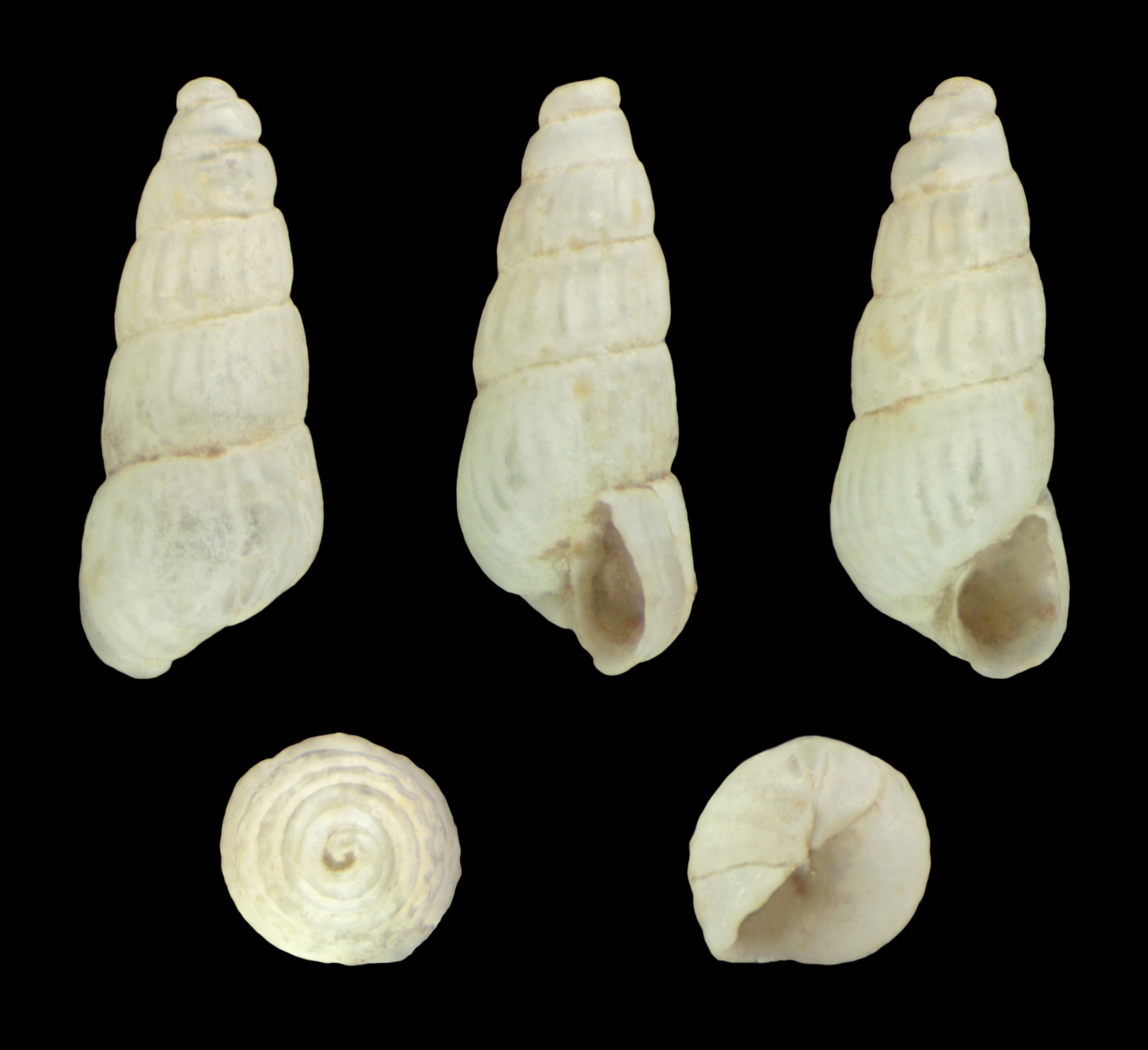
- A shell of Turbonilla obliquata

Scientific classification
- Kingdom: Animalia
- Phylum: Mollusca
- Class: Gastropoda
- Family: Pyramidellidae
- Genus: Turbonilla
- Species: T. obliquata

Binomial name
- Turbonilla obliquata (Philippi, 1844)

Synonyms
- Chemnitzia obliquata Philippi, 1844 (basionym); Turbonilla (Chemnitzia) obliquata (Philippi, 1844)

= Turbonilla obliquata =

Species of gastropod

Turbonilla obliquata is a species of sea snail, a marine gastropod mollusk in the family Pyramidellidae, the pyrams and their allies.

== Description ==
The length of the hyaline shell measures 3 mm. The teleoconch contains nine convex whorls with about 14 oblique small ribs and much wider, smooth interspaces.

== Distribution ==
This marine species occurs in the following locations:

- European waters (ERMS scope): France, Spain, Portugal
- Mediterranean Sea: Greece
- Atlantic Ocean: the Azores.
