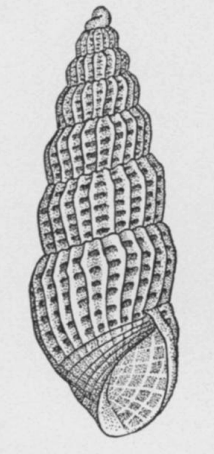
- Drawing of an apertural view of Turbonilla textilis

Scientific classification
- Kingdom: Animalia
- Phylum: Mollusca
- Class: Gastropoda
- Family: Pyramidellidae
- Genus: Turbonilla
- Species: T. textilis

Binomial name
- Turbonilla textilis (Kurtz, 1860)

= Turbonilla textilis =

Species of gastropod

Turbonilla textilis is a species of sea snail, a marine gastropod mollusk in the family Pyramidellidae, the pyrams and their allies.

== Distribution ==
This species occurs in the following locations:

- Caribbean Sea
- Cayman Islands
- Colombia
- Costa Rica
- Gulf of Mexico

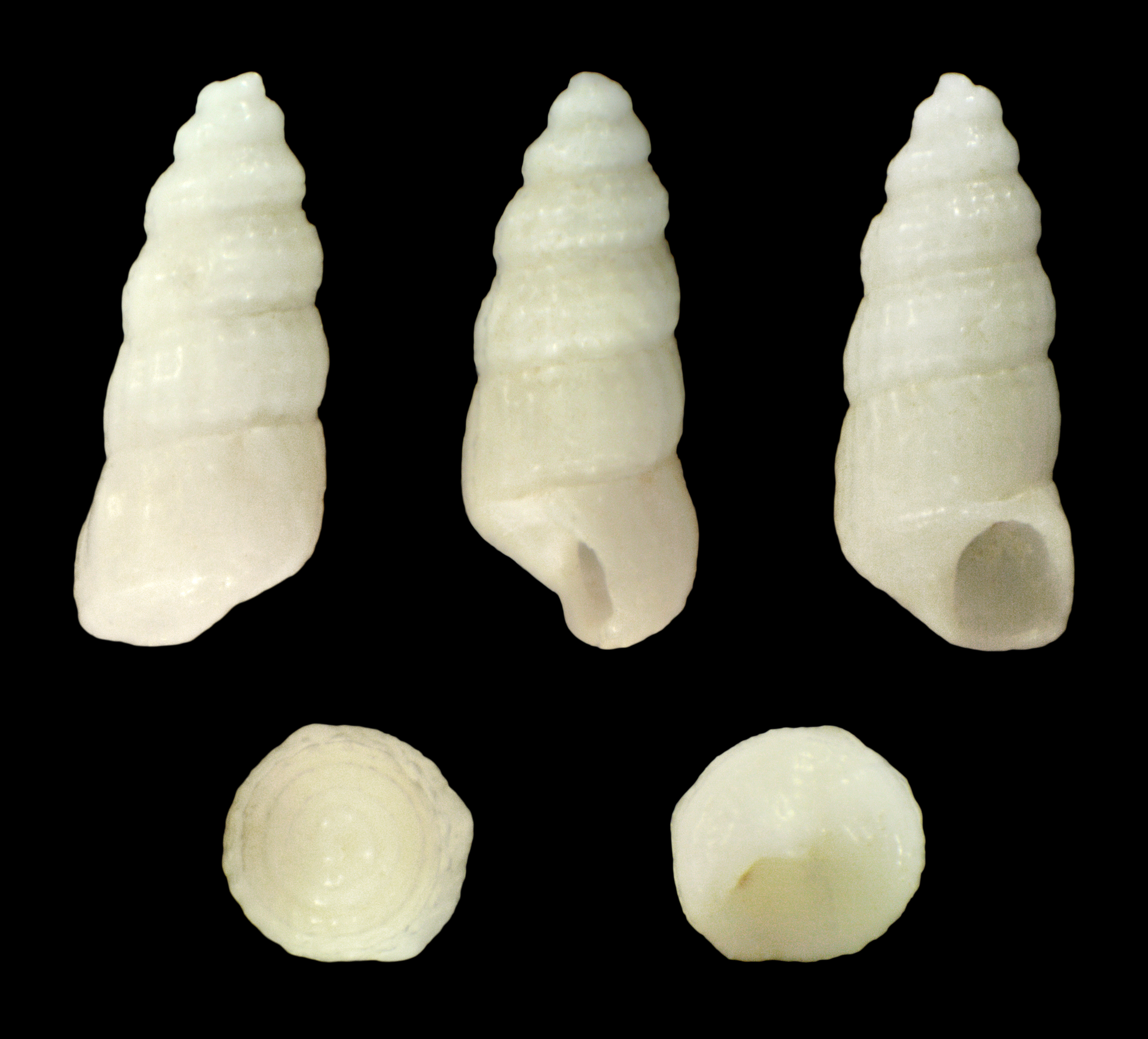
