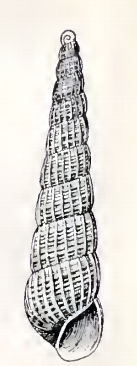
- Drawing of a shell of Turbonilla larunda

Scientific classification
- Kingdom: Animalia
- Phylum: Mollusca
- Class: Gastropoda
- Family: Pyramidellidae
- Genus: Turbonilla
- Species: T. larunda

Binomial name
- Turbonilla larunda Dall & Bartsch, 1909

Synonyms
- Turbonilla (Pyrgiscus) larunda Dall & Bartsch, 1909

= Turbonilla larunda =

Species of gastropod

Turbonilla larunda is a species of sea snail, a marine gastropod mollusk in the family Pyramidellidae, the pyrams and their allies.

== Description ==
The shell has an elongate-conic shape. It is milk-white, with a broad yellow band a little anterior to the middle of the whorls between the sutures. Its length varies between 3.6 mm and 4.3 mm. The two whorls of the protoconch form a depressed helicoid spire. Its axis is at right angles to that of the succeeding turns, upon the first of which it rests, but is not immersed. The nine whorls of the teleoconch are flattened in the middle, rounded at the summit, and quite strongly contracted at the suture. They are ornamented by narrow, sinuous, well developed, retractive axial ribs, of which 16 occur upon the first to seventh, 18 upon the eighth to ninth, and 20 upon the penultimate turn. The intercostal spaces are about three times as wide as the ribs. They are marked by eleven incised spiral lines, of which the three immediately below the summit and the one between the third and fourth above the periphery are finer than the rest, and the fourth and fifth below the summit and the peripheral one are of about equal width, and considerably stronger than the intervening four, which are subequal. The periphery of the body whorl is well rounded. The base of the shell is moderately long, and well rounded. It is marked by the continuations of the axial ribs and seven strongly incised subequally spaced spiral lines, of which the three immediately below the periphery are somewhat interrupted and stronger than the rest. The aperture is oval. The posterior angle is acute. The outer lip is thin, showing the external sculpture within. The columella is slender and somewhat sinuous.

== Distribution ==
The type specimen occurs off La Paz at the Gulf of California.
