= Turbonilla portoricana =

Scientific classification
- Kingdom: Animalia
- Phylum: Mollusca
- Class: Gastropoda
- Family: Pyramidellidae
- Genus: Turbonilla
- Species: T. portoricana

Binomial name
- Turbonilla portoricana Dall & Simpson, 1901

Species of gastropod

Turbonilla portoricana is a species of sea snail, a marine gastropod mollusk in the family Pyramidellidae, the pyrams and their allies.

== Distribution ==
This species occurs in the following locations:

- Aruba
- Bonaire
- Caribbean Sea
- Colombia
- Cuba
- Curaçao
- Gulf of Mexico
- Puerto Rico
- Venezuela
