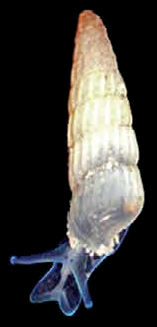
- live Turbonilla acutissima
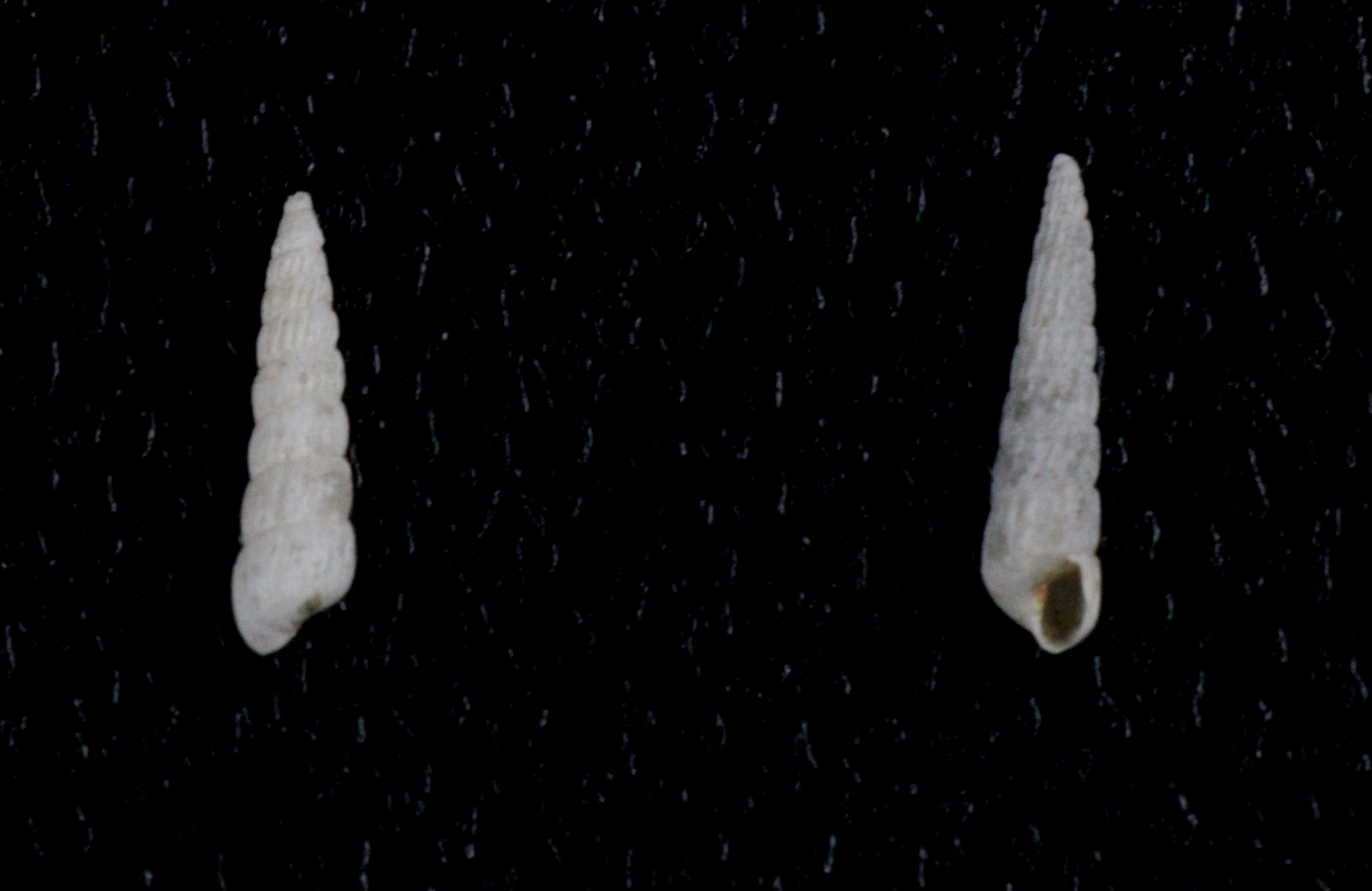
- Two shells of Turbonilla tenuicula

Scientific classification
- Kingdom: Animalia
- Phylum: Mollusca
- Class: Gastropoda
- Superfamily: Pyramidelloidea
- Family: Pyramidellidae
- Subfamily: Turbonillinae
- Genus: Turbonilla; Risso, 1826

Type species
- † Turbonilla costulata Risso, 1826

Synonyms
- Amamimormula Kuroda, 1928; Chemnitzia d'Orbigny, 1839; Cyrtoturbonilla F. Nordsieck, 1972; Dunkeria Carpenter, 1857; Lancea Pease, 1868; Lancella Dall & Bartsch, 1904 (unnecessary replacement name for Lancea Pease, 1868, by Dall & Bartsch erroneously believed to be a junior homonym ); Odostomia (Turbonilla) Risso, 1826; Paramormula Nomura, 1939; Pyrgolampros Sacco, 1892; Turbonilla (Chemnitzia) d'Orbigny, 1839; Turbonilla (Cylindriturbonilla) Nordsieck, 1972 · accepted, alternate representation; Turbonilla (Cyrtoturbonilla) Nordsieck, 1972· accepted, alternate representation; Turbonilla (Graciliturbonilla) Nordsieck, 1972· accepted, alternate representation; Turbonilla (Turbonilla) Risso, 1826; Variturbonilla F. Nordsieck, 1972

= Turbonilla =

Genus of gastropods

Turbonilla is a large genus of ectoparasitic sea snails, marine gastropod molluscs in the family Pyramidellidae, the pyrams and their allies.

This genus in its present state is not monophyletic. Many species may end up reclassified in other genera. (personal communication by Philippe Bouchet, chief editor of the Mollusca in WoRMS).

== General description ==
The generally slender, bluish-white to milk-white, semitranslucent shell is more or less elongated and has a cylindro-conic shape.

The apex is sinistral. The reversed, flattened or projecting protoconch consists of 1½ to 3 whorls that are oblique or tilted from transverse to the axis.

The teleoconch contains many planulate or more or less convex whorls. These are sometimes shouldered and are generally ornamented with less prominent longitudinal ribs ( = costulate).

The intercostal spaces are smooth or crossed bv more or less distinct, incised, sometimes raised, spiral lines. The spiral lines often also appear on the base of the shell, which varies from short, little rounded (the body whorl is subangulated at the periphery), to elongate and well-rounded.

The shape of the aperture varies from subquadrate with a straight columellar lip, to an elongate-ovate shape, well-rounded and produced below, with a curved columellar lip. The peritreme is generally discontinuous, rarely continuous.

The outer lip is always thin and entire. The inner lip is more or less thickened and reflected, often with a plication or fold that is not always visible externally.

The columella is vertical, not plicate. The columellar fold is single, varying in strength. The horny operculum is subspiral. The shell is usually smaller than in Pyramidella and larger than in Odostomia.

The animal has wide tentacles, an elongated, flattened mentum, usually bilobed in front. The foot is large and anteriorly auriculated.

== Species ==
Species within the genus Turbonilla include:

=== A ===
- Turbonilla abbotti (Robba, Di Geronimo, Chaimanee, Negri & Sanfilippo, 2004)
- Turbonilla abercrombiei Melvill, 1896
- Turbonilla abreojensis Dall & Bartsch, 1909
- Turbonilla abreui Peñas & Rolán, 2000
- Turbonilla abrupta Bush, 1899
- Turbonilla abseida Dall & Bartsch, 1906
- Turbonilla academica Strong & Hertlein, 1939
- Turbonilla acer (Laws, 1937)
- Turbonilla acicularis (A. Adams, 1855)
- Turbonilla acosmia Dall & Bartsch, 1906
- Turbonilla acra Dall & Bartsch, 1909
- Turbonilla actopora Dall & Bartsch, 1906
- Turbonilla aculeus (C. B. Adams, 1852)
- Turbonilla acuta (Donovan, 1804)
- Turbonilla acutissima Monterosato, 1884
- Turbonilla adaba Bartsch, 1915
- Turbonilla admira Nomura, 1937
- Turbonilla adolforolani Peñas & Rolán, 2010
- Turbonilla adusta Dall & Bartsch, 1909
- Turbonilla aemilia Thiele, 1925
- Turbonilla aepynota Dall & Bartsch, 1909
- Turbonilla aequalis (Say, 1826)
- Turbonilla affinis (C. B. Adams, 1852)
- Turbonilla agatha Thiele, 1925
- Turbonilla ailhaudi (Saurin, 1959)
- Turbonilla alarconi Strong, 1949
- Turbonilla alaskana Dall & Bartsch, 1909
- † Turbonilla albolapis (Laws, 1937)
- Turbonilla alexandrei Güller & Zelaya, 2019
- Turbonilla alexleoni Peñas & Rolán, 2010
- Turbonilla alfredi Abbott, 1958
- Turbonilla almejasensis Bartsch, 1917
- Turbonilla almo Dall & Bartsch, 1909
- Turbonilla alta Clessin, 1902
- Turbonilla alvarezhalconi Peñas & Rolán, 2010
- Turbonilla alvheimi Lygre & Schander, 2010
- Turbonilla amalia Thiele, 1925
- Turbonilla amanda Thiele, 1925
- Turbonilla amandi Strong & Hertlein, 1939
- Turbonilla ambigua (Saurin, 1962)
- Turbonilla americana (d'Orbigny, 1841)
- Turbonilla amiriana Hertlein & Strong, 1951
- Turbonilla amoena (Monterosato, 1878)
- Turbonilla amortajadensis Baker, Hanna & Strong, 1928
- Turbonilla ampliusulcata Peñas & Rolán, 2010
- Turbonilla anae Peñas & Rolán, 2010
- Turbonilla andersi Peñas & Rolán, 2010
- Turbonilla andrewsi Dall & Bartsch, 1909
- Turbonilla angea Bartsch, 1915
- Turbonilla angelinagagliniae Schander, 1997
- Turbonilla angolensis Schander, 1994
- Turbonilla angusta (Carpenter, 1864): synonym of Chrysallida angusta P. P. Carpenter, 1864
- † Turbonilla angustula Pilsbry & C. W. Johnson, 1917
- Turbonilla anira Bartsch, 1927
- † Turbonilla anita Aldrich, 1907
- Turbonilla anna Thiele, 1925
- Turbonilla annamitica (Saurin, 1959)
- Turbonilla annettae Dall & Bartsch, 1909
- Turbonilla anselmoi Peñas & Rolán, 2010
- Turbonilla anselmopenasi Lygre & Schander, 2010
- Turbonilla antestriata Dall & Bartsch, 1907
- Turbonilla antiquitas Peñas & Rolán, 2010
- Turbonilla anularia Peñas & Rolán, 2010
- Turbonilla aola Peñas & Rolán, 2010
- Turbonilla aoteana Powell, 1930
- Turbonilla approximata Dall & Bartsch, 1906
- Turbonilla apsa Bartsch, 1915
- Turbonilla aquilonaria Silva-Absalao, Dos Santos & De Olivera, 2003
- Turbonilla araceliae Peñas & Rolán, 2010
- Turbonilla aracruzensis Pimenta & Absalao, 2004
- Turbonilla aragoni Dall & Bartsch, 1909
- † Turbonilla aratibacillum Pilsbry & C. W. Johnson, 1917
- Turbonilla arayai Nomura, 1936
- † Turbonilla arcana Laws, 1937
- Turbonilla archeri Dall & Bartsch, 1904
- Turbonilla arcuata Nomura, 1936
- Turbonilla aresta Dall & Bartsch, 1909
- Turbonilla argentea Sowerby III, 1892
- Turbonilla argentina (Doello-Jurado, 1938)
- Turbonilla aripana Strong, 1949
- Turbonilla armandoi Peñas & Rolán, 2010
- Turbonilla arnoldoi De Jong & Coomans, 1988
- Turbonilla arrighii (Saurin, 1959)
- Turbonilla arta Peñas & Rolán, 2010
- Turbonilla aspera Kuroda & Habe, 1971
- † Turbonilla asperedolata Laws, 1940
- Turbonilla asperula Bush, 1899
- Turbonilla asser Dall & Bartsch, 1909
- Turbonilla assimilans E. A. Smith, 1890
- Turbonilla asunae Peñas & Rolán, 2010
- Turbonilla asuncionis Strong, 1949
- Turbonilla ata Bartsch, 1926
- Turbonilla atlantica (Locard, 1897)
- Turbonilla atossa Bartsch, 1915
- Turbonilla attrita Dall & Bartsch, 1909
- Turbonilla atypha Bush, 1899
- Turbonilla aulica Dall & Bartsch, 1906
- Turbonilla aurantia (Carpenter, 1864)
- Turbonilla auricolor Nomura, 1936
- Turbonilla auricoma Dall & Bartsch, 1903
- † Turbonilla awamoana Laws, 1937
- † Turbonilla awana Nomura, 1938
- † Turbonilla awasimulans Laws, 1937
- Turbonilla axeli Bartsch, 1924
- Turbonilla aya Bartsch, 1926
- Turbonilla ayamana Hertlein & Strong, 1951
- Turbonilla azteca Baker, Hanna & Strong, 1926

=== B ===
- Turbonilla bacalladoi Peñas & Rolán, 2010
- Turbonilla baegerti Bartsch, 1917
- Turbonilla bahiensis (Castellanos, 1982)
- Turbonilla bakeri Bartsch, 1912
- Turbonilla barazeri Peñas & Rolán, 2010
- Turbonilla barkleyensis Bartsch, 1917
- Turbonilla barrierensis (Laws, 1937)
- Turbonilla barroi Peñas & Rolán, 2010
- Turbonilla bartolomensis Bartsch, 1917
- Turbonilla bartonella Strong & Hertlein, 1939
- Turbonilla bathybius Barnard, 1963
- Turbonilla bayensis van Aartsen & Corgan, 1996
- † Turbonilla beali Jordan, 1936
- Turbonilla bedoyai Peñas & Rolán, 1997
- Turbonilla bega Peñas & Rolán, 2010
- Turbonilla beidaensis Peñas & Rolán, 2000
- Turbonilla belenae Peñas & Rolán, 2010
- Turbonilla belonis Melvill & Standen, 1896
- Turbonilla belotheca Dall, 1889
- Turbonilla beltiana Hertlein & Strong, 1951
- Turbonilla bengoensis Peñas & Rolán, 1997
- Turbonilla bertha Thiele, 1925
- † Turbonilla bexleyana Laws, 1937
- Turbonilla biangulata (Robba, Di Geronimo, Chaimanee, Negri & Sanfilippo, 2004)
- Turbonilla biolleyi Hertlein & Strong, 1951
- Turbonilla bisulcata Peñas & Rolán, 2010
- Turbonilla blanchae Peñas & Rolán, 2010
- Turbonilla boisselierae Peñas & Rolán, 2010
- Turbonilla boucheti Peñas & Rolán, 2010
- Turbonilla bougainville Peñas & Rolán, 2010
- Turbonilla brachia E.A. Smith, 1890
- Turbonilla brasiliensis Clessin, 1902
- † Turbonilla brevisutura (Laws, 1937)
- Turbonilla brodieae Peñas & Rolán, 2010
- Turbonilla buala Peñas & Rolán, 2010
- Turbonilla bucknilli (Laws, 1937)
- Turbonilla bughotu Peñas & Rolán, 2010
- Turbonilla burchi Gordon, 1938
- Turbonilla bushiana A. E. Verrill, 1882
- Turbonilla buteonis Bartsch, 1909
- Turbonilla buttoni Dautzenberg, 1912
- Turbonilla buzzurroi Peñas & Rolán, 2010

=== C ===
- Turbonilla cabrilloi Bartsch, 1917
- Turbonilla caca Bartsch, 1926
- Turbonilla cactiorum Peñas & Rolán, 2010
- Turbonilla caladoi Peñas & Rolán, 2010
- Turbonilla calini Espinosa & Ortea, 2014
- Turbonilla callimene Bartsch, 1912
- Turbonilla callipeplum Dall & Bartsch, 1909
- Turbonilla calvini Dall & Bartsch, 1909
- Turbonilla campbellica Odhner, 1924
- Turbonilla canadensis Bartsch, 1917
- Turbonilla cancellata (Carpenter, 1857)
- Turbonilla candida (A. Adams, 1855)
- Turbonilla canfieldi Dall & Bartsch, 1907
- Turbonilla cangeyrani Ovalis & Mifsud, 2017
- Turbonilla canquei Dautzenberg, 1912
- Turbonilla capa Bartsch, 1926
- Turbonilla capixaba Pimenta & Absalao, 2004
- Turbonilla cara Nomura, 1936
- Turbonilla carlosruizi Peñas & Rolán, 2010
- Turbonilla carlotae Peñas & Rolán, 2010
- Turbonilla carlottoi Schander, 1994
- Turbonilla carmeae Peñas & Rolán, 2010
- Turbonilla carmenae Peñas & Rolán, 2010
- Turbonilla carpenteri Dall & Bartsch, 1909
- Turbonilla castanea (Keep, 1887)
- Turbonilla castanella Dall, 1908
- Turbonilla cbadamsi (Carpenter, 1857)
- Turbonilla cendoni Peñas & Rolán, 2010
- Turbonilla centrota Dall & Bartsch, 1909
- Turbonilla ceralva Dall & Bartsch, 1909
- Turbonilla cerina A. Adams, 1861
- Turbonilla cesai Peñas & Rolán, 2010
- Turbonilla chalcana Baker, Hanna & Strong, 1928
- Turbonilla charbarensis Melvill & Standen, 1901
- Turbonilla charezieuxi (Saurin, 1959)
- Turbonilla cheverti Hedley, 1901
- Turbonilla chinandegana Hertlein & Strong, 1951
- Turbonilla chirovanga Peñas & Rolán, 2010
- Turbonilla chocolata (Carpenter, 1864)
- Turbonilla choiseul Peñas & Rolán, 2010
- Turbonilla cholutecana Hertlein & Strong, 1951
- Turbonilla churia Bartsch, 1926
- Turbonilla cifara Bartsch, 1915
- Turbonilla cincta A. Adams, 1860
- Turbonilla cinctella Mörch, 1859
- Turbonilla circumlata Peñas & Rolán, 2000
- Turbonilla circumsutura Peñas & Rolán, 2010
- Turbonilla clara Thiele, 1925
- Turbonilla clarinda Bartsch, 1912
- Turbonilla clarquei Peñas & Rolán, 2010
- Turbonilla clementina Bartsch, 1927
- Turbonilla cleo Thiele, 1925
- Turbonilla clessiniana Nomura, 1938
- † Turbonilla clifdenica Laws, 1937
- Turbonilla clippertonensis Hertlein & Allison, 1968
- Turbonilla cochimana Strong, 1949
- Turbonilla coeni Preston, 1905
- Turbonilla colimana Hertlein & Strong, 1951
- Turbonilla collea Bartsch, 1926
- † Turbonilla collisella T. OLdroyd, 1925
- Turbonilla colpodes Melvill, 1910
- † Turbonilla comitas Laws, 1937
- Turbonilla commoda A. Adams, 1860
- Turbonilla compsa Bush, 1899
- Turbonilla compta A. Adams, 1861
- Turbonilla confusa Brazier, 1877
- Turbonilla congoensis Peñas & Rolán, 2000
- Turbonilla conoma Ahrens, 1927
- Turbonilla conradi Bush, 1899
- Turbonilla consanguinea (E. A. Smith, 1891)
- Turbonilla constricta (E. A. Smith, 1891)
- † Turbonilla contexta Pilsbry & C. W. Johnson, 1917
- Turbonilla contrerasiana Hertlein & Strong, 1951
- Turbonilla cookeana Bartsch, 1912
- Turbonilla cookiana (Laws, 1937)
- Turbonilla coomansi Van Aartsen, 1994
- Turbonilla cora (d'Orbigny, 1840)
- Turbonilla corgani Okutani, 1968
- Turbonilla corintonis Hertlein & Strong, 1951
- Turbonilla cornea (A. Adams, 1853)
- Turbonilla corpulens Kirsch, 1959
- Turbonilla corrigea Laseron, 1959
- Turbonilla corsoensis Bartsch, 1917
- Turbonilla cortezi Bartsch, 1917
- Turbonilla corti Dautzenberg & Fischer H., 1897
- Turbonilla coseli Peñas & Rolán, 2002
- Turbonilla costadebilis Peñas & Rolán, 2010
- Turbonilla costasubtilis Peñas & Rolán, 2010
- Turbonilla costifera E.A. Smith, 1871
- Turbonilla cowlesi Strong & Hertlein, 1939
- Turbonilla coyotensis Baker, Hanna & Strong, 1928
- Turbonilla crassa Nomura, 1936
- Turbonilla craticulata Mörch, 1859
- † Turbonilla crebricostata Marwick, 1931
- Turbonilla crickmayi Strong & Hertlein, 1939
- Turbonilla crosnieri Peñas & Rolán, 2010
- Turbonilla cruzazae Peñas & Rolán, 2010
- Turbonilla cummingi Hori & Okutani, 1997
- Turbonilla cura Nomura, 1937
- Turbonilla curta Dall, 1889
- Turbonilla cynthiae De Jong & Coomans, 1988
- Turbonilla cyrtoconoidea Peñas & Rolán, 2010

=== D-E ===
- Turbonilla dakoi Peñas & Rolán, 2010
- Turbonilla dalli Bush, 1899
- Turbonilla danii Peñas & Rolán, 2010
- Turbonilla darwinensis Laseron, 1959
- Turbonilla datei Nomura, 1936
- Turbonilla davidpenasi Peñas & Rolán, 2010
- Turbonilla davidrolani Peñas & Rolán, 2010
- Turbonilla deae Nomura, 1937
- Turbonilla debilis A. Adams, 1860
- Turbonilla deboeri De Jong & Coomans, 1988
- Turbonilla decora E. A. Smith, 1904
- Turbonilla delia Melvill, 1906
- Turbonilla delicata Monterosato, 1874
- Turbonilla delmontana Bartsch, 1937
- Turbonilla delphineae Peñas & Rolán, 2010
- Turbonilla denizi Peñas & Rolán, 2000
- † Turbonilla denseplicata Koenen, 1882
- Turbonilla densesculpturata Peñas & Rolán, 2010
- Turbonilla depressacostae Peñas & Rolán, 2010
- Turbonilla deprofundis Barnard, 1963
- Turbonilla deschampsi Peñas & Rolán, 2010
- Turbonilla deseadensis Di Luca, Güller & Zelaya, 2021
- Turbonilla diegensis Dall & Bartsch, 1909
- Turbonilla dilutacostae Peñas & Rolán, 2010
- Turbonilla dimatteoi Peñas & Rolán, 2010
- Turbonilla dina Dall & Bartsch, 1909
- Turbonilla dinora Bartsch, 1912
- Turbonilla dipsycha (Watson, 1886)
- Turbonilla discrepata Peñas & Rolán, 2010
- Turbonilla dispar Pilsbry, 1897
- Turbonilla disparapex Peñas & Rolán, 2010
- Turbonilla domingana Hertlein & Strong, 1951
- Turbonilla dongbaensis Saurin, 1959
- Turbonilla dora Bartsch, 1917
- Turbonilla doredona Bartsch, 1917
- Turbonilla dracona Bartsch, 1912
- Turbonilla ducalis Thiele, 1925
- Turbonilla dunedinensis (Laws, 1937)
- Turbonilla dunkeri Clessin, 1902
- Turbonilla dunkeriformis (Saurin, 1959)
- Turbonilla duodecimlyrae Peñas & Rolán, 2010
- Turbonilla duodenae Peñas & Rolán, 2010
- † Turbonilla duplicaria Marwick, 1931
- Turbonilla duquei Peñas & Rolán, 2010
- Turbonilla dusiana Nomura, 1937
- Turbonilla edgarii (Melvill, 1896)
- Turbonilla edoensis Yokoyama, 1927
- Turbonilla eduardi Peñas & Rolán, 2010
- Turbonilla edwardensis Bartsch, 1909
- Turbonilla effusa (Gould, 1861)
- Turbonilla ekidana Hertlein & Strong, 1951
- Turbonilla electra Bartsch, 1927
- Turbonilla elegans (d'Orbigny, 1841)
- Turbonilla elegantula A. E. Verrill, 1882
- Turbonilla elejabeitiae Peñas & Rolán, 2010
- Turbonilla eleonora Thiele, 1925
- Turbonilla elsa Thiele, 1925
- Turbonilla elvira Thiele, 1925
- Turbonilla emertoni A. E. Verrill, 1882
- Turbonilla emiliae Melvill, 1896
- Turbonilla emma Thiele, 1925
- Turbonilla enamelicolor Nomura, 1936
- Turbonilla encella Bartsch, 1912
- Turbonilla engbergi Bartsch, 1920
- Turbonilla enna Bartsch, 1927
- Turbonilla eodem Penas & Rolán, 1999
- Turbonilla eques Laws, 1937
- Turbonilla eritima E. A. Smith, 1890
- Turbonilla errabunda (Laws, 1937)
- † Turbonilla erratica Laws, 1937
- † Turbonilla eruita (Laws, 1950)
- Turbonilla erythrosclera (Mörch, 1875)
- Turbonilla eschscholtzi Dall & Bartsch, 1907
- Turbonilla escondida Poppe, Tagaro & Stahlschmidt, 2015
- Turbonilla eucosmobasis Dall & Bartsch, 1907
- Turbonilla eucteana Melvill, 1910
- Turbonilla eugeniae (Saurin, 1959)
- Turbonilla eupellucida Nomura, 1937
- Turbonilla eva Bartsch, 1917
- Turbonilla evadna Bartsch, 1924
- Turbonilla evagone Bartsch, 1924
- Turbonilla evanescens Peñas & Rolán, 2010
- † Turbonilla evelynae (Laws, 1937)
- Turbonilla excolpa Dall & Bartsch, 1909
- Turbonilla exilis (C. B. Adams, 1850)
- Turbonilla exilispira Melvill, 1918
- Turbonilla eyerdami Bartsch, 1927

=== F-G ===
- † Turbonilla facki Koenen, 1882
- Turbonilla fackenthallae Smith & Gordon, 1948
- Turbonilla farinatiae Pimenta & Absalao, 2004
- Turbonilla farroupilha Pimenta & Absalao, 2004
- Turbonilla fasciata (d'Orbigny, 1840)
- Turbonilla fastigata Peñas & Rolán, 2010
- Turbonilla fatuhiva Peñas & Rolán, 2010
- Turbonilla favilla Dall & Bartsch, 1909
- Turbonilla felicita Laseron, 1959
- Turbonilla felisae Peñas & Rolán, 2010
- Turbonilla fernandezantoni Peñas & Rolán, 2010
- Turbonilla fernandoi Peñas & Rolán, 2010
- Turbonilla ferrani Peñas & Rolán, 2010
- Turbonilla festiva de Folin, 1867
- Turbonilla fideliformis Peñas & Rolán, 2010
- Turbonilla fijianorum Peñas & Rolán, 2010
- Turbonilla fijiensis Peñas & Rolán, 2010
- Turbonilla finlayi Powell, 1926
- Turbonilla fischeri E. A. Smith, 1891
- Turbonilla fitoi Peñas & Rolán, 2010
- Turbonilla flaianoi Mazziotti, Agamennone, Micali & Tisselli, 2006
- Turbonilla flavescens (Carpenter, 1857)
- Turbonilla flexicosta (Laseron, 1951)
- Turbonilla fijianorum Peñas & Rolán, 2010
- Turbonilla fijiensis Peñas & Rolán, 2010
- Turbonilla finlayi A. W. B. Powell, 1926
- Turbonilla fitoi Peñas & Rolán, 2010
- Turbonilla flaianoi Mazziotti, Agamennone, Micali & Tisselli, 2006
- Turbonilla flavescens (Carpenter, 1857)
- Turbonilla florida Peñas & Rolán, 2010
- Turbonilla fontainei Peñas & Rolán, 2010
- Turbonilla fonteini De Jong & Coomans, 1988
- Turbonilla forsteriana (Laws, 1937)
- Turbonilla forticostae Peñas & Rolán, 2010
- Turbonilla fragilis A. Adams, 1860
- Turbonilla franciscana Bartsch, 1917
- Turbonilla francisquitana Baker, Hanna & Strong, 1928
- Turbonilla fraterna Melvill, 1910
- Turbonilla fulgidula (Jeffreys, 1884)
- Turbonilla fulvizonata Nomura, 1938
- Turbonilla funiculata de Folin, 1868
- Turbonilla fusca (A. Adams, 1853)
- Turbonilla fuscoelongata Peñas & Rolán, 1997
- Turbonilla fustis Odé, 1995
- Turbonilla gabbiana (J. G. Cooper, 1867)
- Turbonilla gabrielae Peñas, Rolán & Swinnen, 2014
- Turbonilla galactodes Melvill, 1910
- Turbonilla galapagensis Dall & Bartsch, 1909
- Turbonilla galianoi Dall & Bartsch, 1909
- Turbonilla garciai Peñas & Rolán, 2010
- Turbonilla garrettiana Dall & Bartsch, 1906
- Turbonilla garthi Strong & Hertlein, 1939
- Turbonilla gemmula E. A. Smith, 1904
- Turbonilla gemmulata (Saurin, 1959)
- Turbonilla genilda Dall & Bartsch, 1909
- Turbonilla geraudiei (Saurin, 1959)
- Turbonilla gerda Thiele, 1925
- Turbonilla ghanensis Peñas & Rolán, 1997
- Turbonilla giannuzzii Peñas & Rolán, 2010
- Turbonilla gibbosa (Carpenter, 1857)
- Turbonilla gilli Dall & Bartsch, 1907
- Turbonilla giribeti Peñas & Rolán, 2010
- Turbonilla gitaena Dautzenberg & Fischer H., 1897
- Turbonilla gloriamishimana Hori & Fukuda, 1999
- Turbonilla gloriosa Bartsch, 1912
- Turbonilla gofasi Peñas & Rolán, 1999
- Turbonilla gonzagensis Baker, Hanna & Strong, 1928
- Turbonilla gonzaloi Peñas & Rolán, 2010
- Turbonilla gordoniana Hertlein & Strong, 1951
- Turbonilla goudi Peñas & Rolán, 2002
- Turbonilla goytacazi Pimenta & Absalao, 2004
- Turbonilla gracilior (C. B. Adams, 1852)
- † Turbonilla gracilis (Brocchi, 1814)
- Turbonilla gracillima (Carpenter, 1857)
- Turbonilla gradata Bucquoy, Dautzenberg & Dollfus, 1883
- Turbonilla grandis A. E. Verrill, 1885
- † Turbonilla granti (Laws, 1937)
- Turbonilla gravicosta (Laseron, 1951)
- Turbonilla gravis (Laseron, 1951)
- Turbonilla grippi Bartsch, 1912
- Turbonilla grohi Peñas & Rolán, 2010
- Turbonilla gruberi Hertlein & Strong, 1951
- Turbonilla gruveli Dautzenberg, 1912
- Turbonilla guaicurana Strong, 1949
- Turbonilla guanacastensis Hertlein & Strong, 1951
- Turbonilla guatulcoensis Hertlein & Strong, 1951
- Turbonilla guerrai Peñas & Rolán, 2010
- Turbonilla guillemi Peñas & Rolán, 2010
- Turbonilla guilleni Bartsch, 1917
- Turbonilla gutierrezi Peñas & Rolán, 2010

=== H-J ===
- Turbonilla hadakazimana Nomura, 1938
- Turbonilla halanychi Lygre, Kongsrud & Schander, 2011
- Turbonilla haleyi Strong & Hertlein, 1939
- Turbonilla halibrecta Dall & Bartsch, 1909
- Turbonilla halidoma Dall & Bartsch, 1909
- Turbonilla halistrepta Dall & Bartsch, 1909
- Turbonilla hamata Nordsieck, 1972
- Turbonilla hamonvillei (Dautzenberg & Fischer H., 1896)
- Turbonilla hanagaiana Nomura, 1938
- Turbonilla hannai Strong, 1938
- Turbonilla hansi Peñas & Rolán, 2010
- Turbonilla haroldi E. A. Smith, 1890
- † Turbonilla harrisi Aldrich, 1907
- Turbonilla hasimotoi Nomura, 1937
- Turbonilla hattenbergeri Peñas & Rolán, 1997
- † Turbonilla haugrandis Marwick, 1931
- Turbonilla haullevillei Dautzenberg, 1912
- Turbonilla haycocki Dall & Bartsch, 1911
- Turbonilla hecuba Dall & Bartsch, 1913
- Turbonilla hedleyi (Laseron, 1951)
- Turbonilla heilprini Bush, 1899
- Turbonilla hella Thiele, 1925
- Turbonilla hemphilli Bush, 1899
- Turbonilla hermia Melvill, 1906
- Turbonilla hernandezi Peñas & Rolán, 2010
- Turbonilla hertha Thiele, 1925
- Turbonilla hespera Bartsch, 1927
- Turbonilla heterolopha Dall & Bartsch, 1909
- Turbonilla hilda Thiele, 1925
- Turbonilla hipolitensis Dall & Bartsch, 1909
- Turbonilla hiradoensis Pilsbry, 1904
- Turbonilla histias Dall & Bartsch, 1909
- Turbonilla hoeisaeteri Lygre, Kongsrud & Schander, 2011
- Turbonilla hoeki (Dautzenberg & Fischer H., 1896)
- Turbonilla hofmani Angas, 1877
- Turbonilla holocenica Robba, Di Geronimo, Chaimanee, Negri & Sanfilippo, 2004
- Turbonilla homoeotata (Watson, 1886)
- Turbonilla honiara Peñas & Rolán, 2010
- Turbonilla houseri Dall & Bartsch, 1909
- Turbonilla hua Bartsch, 1926
- Turbonilla hulda Thiele, 1925
- Turbonilla humbertoi Peñas & Rolán, 2010
- Turbonilla hypolispa Dall & Bartsch, 1909
- Turbonilla icela Melvill, 1910
- Turbonilla idothea Bartsch, 1927
- Turbonilla iglesiasi Peñas & Rolán, 2010
- Turbonilla ignacia Dall & Bartsch, 1909
- Turbonilla ilfa Bartsch, 1927
- Turbonilla ima Dall & Bartsch, 1909
- Turbonilla imbana Yokoyama, 1922
- Turbonilla imperialis Dall & Bartsch, 1909
- Turbonilla ina Bartsch, 1917
- Turbonilla inaequabilis Peñas & Rolán, 1997
- Turbonilla inaequalis Melvill, 1904
- Turbonilla inca Bartsch, 1926
- Turbonilla incurva (Laseron, 1959)
- Turbonilla indenta (Laseron, 1959)
- Turbonilla indentata (Carpenter, 1857)
- Turbonilla indispensabilis Peñas & Rolán, 2010
- Turbonilla indonesiae van Aartsen & Corgan, 1996
- Turbonilla infans (Laseron, 1951)
- Turbonilla infantula Dall & Bartsch, 1906
- Turbonilla infelix Nomura, 1936
- Turbonilla inferiuslata Peñas & Rolán, 2010
- Turbonilla informis (Laws, 1937)
- Turbonilla infrabita Peñas & Rolán, 2010
- Turbonilla inobservata Peñas & Rolán, 1999
- † Turbonilla insititia Pilsbry & C. W. Johnson, 1917
- Turbonilla insularis Dall & Simpson, 1901
- Turbonilla integra (Saurin, 1959)
- Turbonilla interrupta (Totten, 1835)
- Turbonilla intia Dall & Bartsch, 1926
- Turbonilla iolausi Dall & Bartsch, 1955
- Turbonilla irena Thiele, 1925
- Turbonilla iredalei (Laseron, 1959)
- Turbonilla isabelita Peñas & Rolán, 2010
- Turbonilla isabelitae Peñas & Rolán, 2000
- Turbonilla isabella Thiele, 1925
- Turbonilla isae Peñas & Rolán, 2010
- Turbonilla iseborae Lygre & Schander, 2010
- Turbonilla israelskyi Strong & Hertlein, 1939
- Turbonilla ista Bartsch, 1917
- † Turbonilla itiharana Nomura, 1938
- † Turbonilla itikawana Nomura, 1938
- Turbonilla jactura (Laws, 1937)
- Turbonilla javiercondei Peñas & Rolán, 2010
- Turbonilla javii Peñas & Rolán, 2010
- Turbonilla jeffreysii (Jeffreys, 1848)
- Turbonilla jewetti Dall & Bartsch, 1909
- Turbonilla joelleae Peñas & Rolán, 2010
- Turbonilla johnsoni Baker, Hanna & Strong, 1928
- Turbonilla jordii Peñas & Rolán, 2002
- Turbonilla jorgei Peñas & Rolán, 2010
- Turbonilla joseantonioi Peñas & Rolán, 2010
- Turbonilla joubini Dautzenberg, 1912
- Turbonilla josephi (Saurin, 1959)
- Turbonilla jozinae van Aartsen & Corgan, 1996
- Turbonilla juanhorroi Peñas & Rolán, 2010
- Turbonilla juani Bartsch, 1917
- Turbonilla juliae Peñas & Rolán, 2010

=== K-L ===
- † Turbonilla kaawa (Laws, 1937)
- Turbonilla kaapor Pimenta & Absalao, 2004
- Turbonilla kadavu Peñas & Rolán, 2010
- Turbonilla kaliwana Strong, 1949
- Turbonilla kamayura Silva-Absalao, Dos Santos & De Olivera, 2003
- Turbonilla kanagawana Nomura, 1938
- Turbonilla kathiewayae Peñas & Rolán, 2010
- † Turbonilla kawanoensis Nomura, 1939
- Turbonilla keisukeana Yokoyama, 1927
- Turbonilla kelseyi Dall & Bartsch, 1909
- † Turbonilla kereruensis (Laws, 1937)
- Turbonilla kerstinae Schander, 1994
- Turbonilla kesennumana Nomura, 1938
- Turbonilla kidoensis (Yokoyama, 1922)
- Turbonilla kincaidi Bartsch, 1912
- Turbonilla kingi (Laws, 1937)
- Turbonilla kitcheni (Laseron, 1951)
- Turbonilla kmagha Peñas & Rolán, 2010
- Turbonilla koehleri Peñas & Rolán, 2010
- † Turbonilla koeneniana Sacco, 1892 †
- † Turbonilla komitica Laws, 1937
- Turbonilla korantengi Lygre & Schander, 2010
- † Turbonilla koruahina Laws, 1937
- Turbonilla krakstadi Lygre & Schander, 2010
- Turbonilla kraussii Clessin, 1890
- Turbonilla krebsii (Mörch, 1875)
- Turbonilla kugyoi Nomura, 1938
- Turbonilla kuraenohamana Hori & Fukuda, 1999
- Turbonilla kurodai Nomura, 1936
- † Turbonilla kururiensis Nomura, 1939
- Turbonilla kymatoessa (Watson, 1886)
- Turbonilla laboutei Peñas & Rolán, 2010
- Turbonilla lactea (Linnaeus, 1758)
- Turbonilla laevicostata Sowerby III, 1892
- Turbonilla laminata (Carpenter, 1864)
- Turbonilla laminedentata de Folin, 1879
- Turbonilla lamna Bartsch, 1917
- Turbonilla lamyi Hedley, 1916
- Turbonilla landersi Peñas & Rolán, 2010
- Turbonilla langae (Saurin, 1959)
- Turbonilla lara Dall & Bartsch, 1909
- Turbonilla larranagai Peñas & Rolán, 2010
- Turbonilla larunda Dall & Bartsch, 1909
- Turbonilla latacosta (Laseron, 1959)
- Turbonilla lataminuta Peñas & Rolán, 2010
- Turbonilla laticonica Nomura, 1936
- Turbonilla latilabri Peñas & Rolán, 2010
- Turbonilla laura Thiele, 1925
- Turbonilla laurae Peñas & Rolán, 2010
- Turbonilla lawsi (Powell, 1937)
- Turbonilla lazaroensis Bartsch, 1917
- Turbonilla legoffi Peñas & Rolán, 2010
- Turbonilla lehouarnoi Peñas & Rolán, 2010
- Turbonilla leniterdentata Peñas & Rolán, 2010
- Turbonilla lepta Pimenta & Absalao, 2004 (Preoccupied by Turbonilla lepta Dall & Bartsch, 1909, but no replacement name is available. )
- Turbonilla lepta Dall & Bartsch, 1909
- Turbonilla leqatai Peñas & Rolán, 2010
- Turbonilla leta Bartsch, 1927
- Turbonilla lerichei (Saurin, 1959)
- Turbonilla leuca Bush, 1899
- Turbonilla levis (C. B. Adams, 1850)
- Turbonilla levisculpturata Peñas & Rolán, 2010
- Turbonilla levislyrata Peñas & Rolán, 2010
- Turbonilla lillingtoniana (Laws, 1937)
- Turbonilla lillybeckae Nowell-Usticke, 1969
- Turbonilla linearis (Laseron, 1959)
- Turbonilla linjaica Melvill & Standen, 1901
- Turbonilla lirata (A. Adams, 1855)
- Turbonilla lituyana Dall & Bartsch, 1909
- Turbonilla liufaui Peñas & Rolán, 2010
- Turbonilla loboi Peñas & Rolán, 2010
- Turbonilla loiclegoffi Peñas & Rolán, 2010
- Turbonilla lopezyartoi Peñas & Rolán, 2010
- Turbonilla lordii (E. A. Smith, 1880)
- Turbonilla louiseae Clarke, 1954
- Turbonilla lozoueti Peñas & Rolán, 2002
- Turbonilla luandensis Peñas & Rolán, 1997
- Turbonilla lucana Dall & Bartsch, 1909
- Turbonilla lucina Nomura, 1938
- Turbonilla lyalli Dall & Bartsch, 1907

=== M ===
- Turbonilla macaensis Pimenta & Absalao, 2001
- Turbonilla macandreae (Adams H., 1871)
- Turbonilla macbridei Dall & Bartsch, 1909
- † Turbonilla macies Laws, 1937
- Turbonilla macleayana Tenison-Woods, 1876
- Turbonilla macouni Dall & Bartsch, 1910
- Turbonilla macra Dall & Bartsch, 1909
- † Turbonilla macsotayi (Landau & LaFollette, 2015)
- Turbonilla madriella Strong, 1938
- Turbonilla madrinensis Lamy, 1905
- Turbonilla maestratii Pimenta & Absalao, 2004
- Turbonilla magdalinensis Bartsch, 1927
- Turbonilla magister van Aartsen & Corgan, 1996
- Turbonilla magnacastanea Peñas & Rolán, 2010
- Turbonilla magnifica (Seguenza G., 1879)
- Turbonilla magroi Peñas & Rolán, 2010
- Turbonilla major (C. B. Adams, 1852)
- Turbonilla mala Nomura, 1937
- Turbonilla malaita Peñas & Rolán, 2010
- Turbonilla malakula Peñas & Rolán, 2010
- Turbonilla malaquiasi Peñas & Rolán, 2010
- Turbonilla malulu Peñas & Rolán, 2010
- Turbonilla manaoba Peñas & Rolán, 2010
- Turbonilla manoloi Peñas & Rolán, 2010
- Turbonilla manolorolani Peñas & Rolán, 2010
- Turbonilla mara Bartsch, 1926
- Turbonilla mariae Tenison-Woods, 1875
- Turbonilla mariajoseae Peñas & Rolán, 2010
- Turbonilla mariana Bartsch, 1917
- Turbonilla marnayae Saurin, 1959
- Turbonilla marshalli Dall & Bartsch, 1909
- Turbonilla martae Peñas & Rolán, 1997
- Turbonilla martha Thiele, 1925
- Turbonilla martinezortii Peñas & Rolán, 2010
- Turbonilla masamunei Nomura, 1936
- Turbonilla masayana Hertlein & Strong, 1951
- Turbonilla mataderorum Peñas & Rolán, 2010
- † Turbonilla mateldae Selli, 1974
- Turbonilla matsushimensis Nomura, 1936
- Turbonilla matusimensis Nomura, 1936
- Turbonilla mayana Baker, Hanna & Strong, 1928
- Turbonilla mcguirei Strong & Hertlein, 1939
- Turbonilla meanguerensis Hertlein & Strong, 1951
- Turbonilla mediocris Peñas & Rolán, 1999
- Turbonilla megascymna Silva-Absalao, Dos Santos & De Olivera, 2003
- Turbonilla melea Bartsch, 1924 (synonym: Turbonilla (Pyrgiscus) melea Batsch, 1924)
- Turbonilla melea Bartsch, 1927 - unreplaced junior homonym (invalid: junior homonym of Turbonilla melea Bartsch, 1924) (synonym: Turbonilla (Ptycheulimella) melea Bartsch, 1927 · alternative representation)
- Turbonilla melitta Thiele, 1925
- Turbonilla melvilli Dautzenberg, 1912
- Turbonilla mendana Peñas & Rolán, 2010
- Turbonilla menoui Peñas & Rolán, 2010
- Turbonilla mercedesae Peñas & Rolán, 2010
- Turbonilla mermeroglaphyra Silva-Absalao, Dos Santos & De Olivera, 2003
- Turbonilla metulina A. Adams, 1860
- Turbonilla mexicana Dall & Bartsch, 1909
- Turbonilla micalii Peñas & Rolán, 2010
- Turbonilla micans (Monterosato, 1875)
- Turbonilla michaelis Melvill, 1910
- Turbonilla microperone Melvill, 1904
- Turbonilla midas Pimenta & Absalao, 2004
- Turbonilla middendorffi Bartsch, 1927
- Turbonilla mighelsi Bartsch, 1909
- Turbonilla miguelgomezi Peñas & Rolán, 2010
- Turbonilla migueloi Peñas & Rolán, 2010
- Turbonilla minna Thiele, 1925
- Turbonilla miona Bartsch, 1927
- Turbonilla mira Nomura, 1937
- Turbonilla mirifica Pallary, 1904
- Turbonilla mitis (Laws, 1937)
- Turbonilla miurana Nomura, 1937
- Turbonilla modesta (d'Orbigny, 1841)
- Turbonilla modica A. Adams, 1860
- Turbonilla molini Peñas & Rolán, 2010
- Turbonilla mollita Nomura, 1937
- Turbonilla mongga Peñas & Rolán, 2010
- Turbonilla monilifera Dall & Bartsch, 1909
- Turbonilla montoyai Peñas & Rolán, 2010
- Turbonilla montserratae Peñas & Rolán, 2010
- Turbonilla moorei Laws, 1937
- Turbonilla morchi Dall & Bartsch, 1907
- Turbonilla morenoi Peñas & Rolán, 2010
- Turbonilla mormuloides Nomura, 1936
- Turbonilla muelleri Maltzan, 1885
- Turbonilla multicostata (C. B. Adams, 1850)
- Turbonilla multilirata (Monterosato, 1875)
- Turbonilla mumia (A. Adams, 1861)
- Turbonilla munda A. Adams, 1860
- Turbonilla muricata (Carpenter, 1857)
- Turbonilla muricatoides Dall & Bartsch, 1907
- Turbonilla murilloi Peñas & Rolán, 2010
- Turbonilla musorstom Peñas & Rolán, 2010
- Turbonilla myia Bartsch, 1927

=== N-O ===
- Turbonilla nahuana Baker, Hanna & Strong, 1928
- Turbonilla nahuatliana Hertlein & Strong, 1951
- Turbonilla nana (Laseron, 1959)
- Turbonilla nanseni Lygre, Kongsrud & Schander, 2011
- Turbonilla nansoutii de Folin, 1873
- Turbonilla nata Nomura, 1938
- † Turbonilla natales Laws, 1937
- Turbonilla neocaledonica Peñas & Rolán, 2010
- Turbonilla neogila Melvill, 1910
- Turbonilla nereia Dall & Bartsch, 1909
- Turbonilla nesiotes Pimenta & Absalão, 1998
- Turbonilla newcombei Dall & Bartsch, 1907
- † Turbonilla ngatutura (Laws, 1940)
- Turbonilla nicaraguana Hertlein & Strong, 1951
- Turbonilla nicarasana Hertlein & Strong, 1951
- Turbonilla nicholsi Dall & Bartsch, 1909
- Turbonilla nicobarica Thiele, 1925
- Turbonilla nicoyana Hertlein & Strong, 1951
- Turbonilla nigricolor Nomura, 1936
- Turbonilla nihilfere Peñas & Rolán, 2010
- Turbonilla ninona Laseron, 1959
- Turbonilla nippona Nomura, 1936
- Turbonilla nitida A. Adams, 1860
- Turbonilla nivea (Stimpson, 1851)
- Turbonilla nodai (Robba, Di Geronimo, Chaimanee, Negri & Sanfilippo, 2004)
- Turbonilla nodoscalare Peñas & Rolán, 2010
- Turbonilla nodulosa (Laseron, 1959)
- Turbonilla nodulyrata Peñas & Rolán, 2010
- Turbonilla nofronii Peñas & Rolán, 1997
- Turbonilla nonica Bartsch, 1927
- Turbonilla nonnota Nomura, 1936
- †Turbonilla numamurana Nomura, 1938
- Turbonilla nuttalli Dall & Bartsch, 1909
- Turbonilla nuttingi Dall & Bartsch, 1909
- Turbonilla nychia Bartsch, 1924
- † Turbonilla oamarua Laws, 1937
- Turbonilla oaxacana Hertlein & Strong, 1951
- Turbonilla obeliscus (C. B. Adams, 1850)
- Turbonilla obesa Dall & Bartsch, 1909
- Turbonilla obliqua (Laseron, 1959)
- Turbonilla obliquata (Philippi, 1844)
- Turbonilla obsoleta (Carpenter, 1857)
- Turbonilla oceanica Oliver, 1915
- Turbonilla oenoa Bartsch, 1924
- † Turbonilla okadaensis Nomura, 1939
- Turbonilla oligopleura Melvill, 1910
- Turbonilla olivellai Moreno, Peñas & Rolán, 2003
- Turbonilla oliverioi Peñas & Rolán, 1997
- Turbonilla opisthocostae Peñas & Rolán, 2010
- Turbonilla oregonensis Dall & Bartsch, 1907
- Turbonilla orientica Corgan, 1970
- Turbonilla ornata (d'Orbigny, 1840)
- Turbonilla orthocostae Peñas & Rolán, 2010
- Turbonilla osrhomboides Peñas & Rolán, 2010
- Turbonilla osyuensis Nomura, 1936
- Turbonilla otnirocensis Hertlein & Strong, 1951
- Turbonilla ottomoerchi Hertlein & Strong, 1951
- Turbonilla otukai Nomura, 1938
- Turbonilla ovalis de Folin, 1868
- Turbonilla owenga (Laws, 1937)
- Turbonilla ozanneana Hertlein & Strong, 1951

=== P ===
- Turbonilla pablopenasi Peñas, Rolán & Swinnen, 2014
- Turbonilla pacaudi Peñas & Rolán, 2010
- Turbonilla pachypleura Melvill, 1910
- Turbonilla pagesi Peñas & Rolán, 2010
- † Turbonilla pakaurangiensis (Laws, 1939)
- Turbonilla panamensis (C. B. Adams, 1852)
- Turbonilla paquitae Peñas & Rolán, 2010
- † Turbonilla paraguanensis Landau & LaFollette, 2016
- Turbonilla paralaminata Castellanos, 1982
- Turbonilla paramoea Dall & Bartsch, 1909
- Turbonilla parlucidula Nomura, 1936
- Turbonilla parsysti Peñas & Rolán, 2002
- Turbonilla parviscymna Pimenta & Absalao, 2004
- Turbonilla parvitesta Nomura, 1936
- Turbonilla paschalis Thiele, 1925
- Turbonilla patagonica Güller & Zelaya, 2019
- Turbonilla patricia Thiele, 1925
- Turbonilla patruelis Melvill, 1918
- Turbonilla paucicostulata Tokunaga, 1906
- Turbonilla paucilirata (Carpenter, 1857)
- Turbonilla paucina Laseron, 1959
- Turbonilla paucistriata (Jeffreys, 1884)
- Turbonilla paula Thiele, 1925
- Turbonilla pauli Smith & Gordon, 1958
- Turbonilla paulinoi Pimenta & Absalao, 2004
- Turbonilla pauper Nomura, 1936
- Turbonilla pauperata Locard, 1897
- Turbonilla paupercostae Peñas & Rolán, 2010
- Turbonilla paupercula Nomura, 1936
- Turbonilla pazana Dall & Bartsch, 1909
- Turbonilla pazensis Baker, Hanna & Strong, 1928
- Turbonilla pazondinae Peñas & Rolán, 2010
- Turbonilla peilei Dall & Bartsch, 1911
- Turbonilla penascoensis Lowe, 1935
- Turbonilla penasi Nofroni & Gubbioli, 2000
- Turbonilla penistoni Bush, 1899
- Turbonilla pentalopha Dall & Bartsch, 1903
- Turbonilla penuriacostarum Peñas & Rolán, 2010
- Turbonilla pequensis Dall & Bartsch, 1909
- † Turbonilla peraequa Pilsbry & C. W. Johnson, 1917
- Turbonilla perelloi Peñas & Rolán, 2010
- Turbonilla perezdionisi Peñas & Rolán, 1997
- Turbonilla perfecta A. Adams, 1860
- Turbonilla pericuana Strong, 1949
- Turbonilla periscelida Dall & Bartsch, 1909
- Turbonilla perlepida A. E. Verrill, 1885
- † Turbonilla pertenuis Gabb, 1873
- Turbonilla pesa Dall & Bartsch, 1910
- † Turbonilla petaneana (Laws, 1937)
- Turbonilla phalera Dall & Bartsch, 1909
- Turbonilla phanea Dall & Bartsch, 1909
- Turbonilla philmaestratii Peñas & Rolán, 2010
- Turbonilla philomelae (Watson, 1886)
- Turbonilla phyllidis Melvill, 1910
- Turbonilla pierrelozoueti Peñas & Rolán, 2010
- Turbonilla pinguis (Laseron, 1951)
- Turbonilla pini Peñas & Rolán, 1997
- Turbonilla pizarroae Peñas & Rolán, 2010
- Turbonilla plana (Robba, Di Geronimo, Chaimanee, Negri & Sanfilippo, 2004)
- Turbonilla planicostata Yokoyama, 1922
- Turbonilla planitesta Nomura, 1936
- † Turbonilla plastica Guppy, 1896
- Turbonilla pleijeli Schander, 1994
- † Turbonilla plicatula (Brocchi, 1814)
- † Turbonilla pliocenica (Laws, 1937)
- Turbonilla pluto Dall & Bartsch, 1909
- Turbonilla pocahontasae Henderson & Bartsch, 1914
- † Turbonilla polaris Hedley, 1916
- Turbonilla porrecta (Laseron, 1959)
- Turbonilla porteri Baker, Hanna & Strong, 1928
- Turbonilla portoparkerensis Hertlein & Strong, 1951
- Turbonilla portoricana Dall & Simpson, 1901
- Turbonilla postacuticostata Sacco, 1892
- Turbonilla poupini Peñas & Rolán, 2010
- Turbonilla powelli Bucknill, 1924
- Turbonilla powhatani Henderson & Bartsch, 1914
- † Turbonilla praegravata Laws, 1940
- Turbonilla prefasii Peñas & Rolán, 2010
- Turbonilla procerita (Laseron, 1959)
- Turbonilla prolongata (Carpenter, 1857)
- Turbonilla proneri Peñas & Rolán, 2010
- Turbonilla propingua (Laseron, 1951)
- Turbonilla prosocostae Peñas & Rolán, 2010
- † Turbonilla pseudactopora
- Turbonilla pseudapproximata Nomura, 1936
- † Turbonilla pseudohumilis Nomura, 1938
- Turbonilla pseudomala Nomura, 1938
- Turbonilla pseudomarteli Peñas & Rolán, 1997
- Turbonilla pseudomultigyrata Nomura, 1936
- Turbonilla puella Thiele, 1930
- Turbonilla pugetensis Bartsch, 1917
- † Turbonilla pukeuriensis Laws, 1937
- Turbonilla pulchella (d'Orbigny, 1841)
- † Turbonilla pulchra Deshayes, 1861
- Turbonilla pumila Seguenza G., 1876
- Turbonilla puncta (C. B. Adams, 1850)
- Turbonilla punctillum Melvill, 1910
- Turbonilla punctiperipherata Nomura, 1936
- Turbonilla punicea Dall, 1884
- Turbonilla pupodentata Peñas & Rolán, 2010
- Turbonilla pupoides (d'Orbigny, 1841)
- Turbonilla pupominuta Peñas & Rolán, 2010
- Turbonilla pusilla (Philippi, 1844)
- † Turbonilla pygmaea (Grateloup, 1838)
- Turbonilla pyrgidium Tomlin & Shackleford, 1914
- Turbonilla pyrrha Bush, 1899
- Turbonilla pyrrha Bartsch, 1927: preoccupied name without replacement name

=== Q-R ===
- † Turbonilla quadruplator (Laws, 1940)
- Turbonilla quaestuosa Melvill, 1910
- Turbonilla queenslandica (Laseron, 1959)
- Turbonilla quesadai Peñas & Rolán, 2010
- Turbonilla quintanai Peñas & Rolán, 2010
- Turbonilla rachialis Pimenta & Absalao, 2004
- Turbonilla rafaeli Peñas & Rolán, 1997
- Turbonilla rakiura (Laws, 1937)
- Turbonilla rambhanensis (Preston, 1914)
- Turbonilla ramosinsulae Peñas & Rolán, 2010
- † Turbonilla raptor (Laws, 1937)
- Turbonilla raritans Nomura, 1936
- Turbonilla rathbuni Verrill & Smith, 1880
- Turbonilla ratusukunai Peñas & Rolán, 2010
- Turbonilla raymondi Dall & Bartsch, 1909
- Turbonilla realejoensis Hertlein & Strong, 1951
- Turbonilla recta Dall & Bartsch, 1909
- Turbonilla recticostata Melvill, 1910
- Turbonilla rectogallica Sacco, 1892
- Turbonilla redondoensis Bartsch, 1917
- Turbonilla regina Dall & Bartsch, 1909
- Turbonilla regis (Saurin, 1959)
- Turbonilla reticulata (C. B. Adams, 1850)
- Turbonilla rewa Peñas & Rolán, 2010
- Turbonilla rex Thiele, 1925
- Turbonilla rhabdoides (Watson, 1886)
- Turbonilla rhabdota (Watson, 1886)
- Turbonilla rhea Bartsch, 1927
- Turbonilla rhizophorae Hertlein & Strong, 1951
- Turbonilla richeri Peñas & Rolán, 2010
- Turbonilla ridgwayi Dall & Bartsch, 1909
- Turbonilla ridiculosa Nomura, 1937
- Turbonilla riisei (Mørch, 1875)
- Turbonilla rikuzenosimensis Nomura, 1938
- Turbonilla rima Bartsch, 1926
- Turbonilla rimaca Bartsch, 1926
- Turbonilla rinella Dall & Bartsch, 1910
- Turbonilla rixtae (De Jong & Coomans, 1988)
- Turbonilla rodejai Peñas & Rolán, 2010
- Turbonilla rodrii Peñas & Rolán, 2010
- Turbonilla rolingiana Saurin, 1962
- Turbonilla romeasiana Saurin, 1962
- Turbonilla rosapereirae Peñas & Rolán, 2010
- Turbonilla rosewateri Corgan & van Aartsen, 1993
- Turbonilla rubioi Peñas & Rolán, 1997
- Turbonilla rudoi Peñas & Rolán, 2010
- Turbonilla rushii Bush, 1899
- Turbonilla russell Peñas & Rolán, 2010

=== S ===
- Turbonilla salinasensis Bartsch, 1928
- Turbonilla samadiae Peñas & Rolán, 2010
- Turbonilla sanctorum Dall & Bartsch, 1909
- Turbonilla sandoi Nomura, 1938
- Turbonilla sanjuani Peñas & Rolán, 2010
- Turbonilla sanmatiensis Castellanos, 1982
- Turbonilla sansibarica Thiele, 1925
- Turbonilla santamariana Bartsch, 1917
- Turbonilla santarosana Dall & Bartsch, 1909
- Turbonilla santosana Dall & Bartsch, 1909
- Turbonilla scala (Laws, 1937)
- Turbonilla scalaeformis Peñas & Rolán, 2010
- Turbonilla scalariformis Thiele, 1930
- Turbonilla scaliola A. Adams, 1860
- Turbonilla scalpidens Watson, 1886
- Turbonilla scammonensis Bartsch, 1912
- Turbonilla scapulata Pimenta & Absalao, 2004
- Turbonilla scarabinoi Peñas & Rolán, 2010
- Turbonilla schlumbergeri Dautzenberg & Fischer H., 1896
- Turbonilla schmitti Bartsch, 1917
- Turbonilla scitula A. Adams, 1861
- Turbonilla scrobiculata Schander, 1994
- Turbonilla sculptilis A. Adams, 1860
- Turbonilla sealei Strong & Hertlein, 1939
- Turbonilla sebastiani Bartsch, 1917
- Turbonilla secernenda Dautzenberg, 1912
- Turbonilla secura Dall & Bartsch, 1906
- Turbonilla sedillina Dall & Bartsch, 1904
- Turbonilla semela Bartsch, 1924
- Turbonilla semicolorata Yokoyama, 1927
- Turbonilla semicostata (Jeffreys, 1884)
- † Turbonilla semicostata Lozouet & Maestrati, 1982 (secondary junior homonym)
- † Turbonilla semilaevigata (Laws, 1937)
- Turbonilla senegalensis Maltzan, 1885
- † Turbonilla separabilis Laws, 1937
- Turbonilla serrae Dall & Bartsch, 1907
- Turbonilla shigeohorii Peñas & Rolán, 2010
- Turbonilla shimeki Dall & Bartsch, 1909
- Turbonilla shuyakensis Bartsch, 1927
- Turbonilla signae Dall & Bartsch, 1909
- Turbonilla simileulimella Peñas & Rolán, 2010
- Turbonilla similtiberia Peñas & Rolán, 2010
- Turbonilla simpsoni Dall & Bartsch, 1909
- Turbonilla sinaloana Strong, 1949
- Turbonilla sinensis Sowerby III, 1894
- Turbonilla sinensis Pimenta & Absalão, 1998: primary homonym of Turbonilla sinensis G.B. Sowerby III, 1894, but no replacement name has been proposed
- Turbonilla singularis Peñas & Rolán, 2010
- Turbonilla sinuosa (Jeffreys, 1884)
- Turbonilla sirena Bartsch, 1927
- Turbonilla sitioi Nomura, 1936
- Turbonilla smithi Strebel, 1905
- Turbonilla smithsoni Dall & Bartsch, 1909
- Turbonilla solidissima Nomura, 1936
- Turbonilla solomonensis Peñas & Rolán, 2010
- † Turbonilla someiensis Nomura, 1939
- Turbonilla soniliana Hertlein & Strong, 1951
- Turbonilla sordida Nomura, 1936
- Turbonilla sororia Melvill, 1896
- † Turbonilla speighti Laws, 1937
- Turbonilla speira (Ravenel, 1859)
- Turbonilla stearnsii Dall & Bartsch, 1903
- Turbonilla stegastris Melvill & Standen, 1901
- Turbonilla stelleri Bartsch, 1927
- Turbonilla stenogyra Dall & Bartsch, 1909
- Turbonilla stephanogyra Dall & Bartsch, 1909
- Turbonilla stillmani Smith & Gordon, 1948
- Turbonilla stimpsoni Bush, 1899
- Turbonilla stipes (Laws, 1937)
- Turbonilla stonei Strong & Hertlein, 1939
- † Turbonilla stoneleighana Laws, 1937
- Turbonilla strebeli Corgan, 1969
- Turbonilla striosa (C. B. Adams, 1852)
- Turbonilla strongi Willett, 1931
- Turbonilla stylina (Carpenter, 1864)
- Turbonilla subdelia Saurin, 1959
- † Turbonilla submarginata Deshayes, 1861
- Turbonilla subplanicostata Yokoyama, 1927
- Turbonilla substriata (C. B. Adams, 1850)
- Turbonilla subtilissima Dautzenberg, 1912
- Turbonilla subula Mörch, 1859
- Turbonilla subulina Monterosato, 1889
- Turbonilla sulacana Hertlein & Strong, 1951
- Turbonilla sultana Thiele, 1925
- Turbonilla summafulgens Peñas & Rolán, 2010
- Turbonilla sumneri Bartsch, 1909
- Turbonilla superba Dall & Bartsch, 1909
- Turbonilla supramirabilis Nomura, 1936
- Turbonilla sursumnodosa Peñas & Rolán, 2010
- Turbonilla susomendezi Peñas & Rolán, 1997
- Turbonilla suteri Powell, 1926
- Turbonilla suturabrevis Peñas & Rolán, 2010
- Turbonilla suva Peñas & Rolán, 2010
- Turbonilla swani Dall & Bartsch, 1909
- Turbonilla swinneni Peñas & Rolán, 1997
- † Turbonilla sycophanta (Laws, 1937)
- Turbonilla sykesii Melvill, 1910
- Turbonilla syrtensis van Aartsen, 1981

=== T ===
- † Turbonilla tabanellii Bongiardino & Micali, 2018
- Turbonilla talma Dall & Bartsch, 1910
- Turbonilla tanquamacus Peñas & Rolán, 2010
- Turbonilla tantilla Hornung & Mermod, 1924
- Turbonilla taroaniara Peñas & Rolán, 2010
- Turbonilla tarragai Peñas & Rolán, 2010
- Turbonilla tasmanica Tenison-Woods, 1875
- Turbonilla taylori Dall & Bartsch, 1907
- Turbonilla taylori Hedley, 1909 : preoccupied by Turbonilla taylori Dall & Bartsch, 1907, but specifically distinct.
- Turbonilla tecalco Bartsch, 1917
- Turbonilla tefunta Bartsch, 1915
- Turbonilla teganumana Yokoyama, 1922
- Turbonilla tegulata G. B. Sowerby III, 1892
- Turbonilla tehuantepecana Hertlein & Strong, 1951
- Turbonilla templadoi Peñas & Rolán, 1997
- Turbonilla templaris Melvill, 1898
- Turbonilla templetonis Hertlein & Strong, 1951
- Turbonilla tenuicosta Issel, 1869
- Turbonilla tenuicula (Gould, 1853)
- Turbonilla tenuilirata (Carpenter, 1857)
- Turbonilla terebralis (Carpenter, 1857)
- Turbonilla terebrina Melvill, 1896
- Turbonilla terminuslevis Peñas & Rolán, 2010
- † Turbonilla teutonoplicatula Sacco, 1892
- Turbonilla textilis (Kurtz, 1860)
- Turbonilla thaanumi Pilsbry & Vanatta, 1908
- Turbonilla thakombau Peñas & Rolán, 2010
- Turbonilla theone Bartsch, 1927
- Turbonilla thewe Peñas & Rolán, 2010
- Turbonilla thornleyana Laseron, 1951
- Turbonilla thryallis Melvill, 1918
- Turbonilla thyne Bartsch, 1924
- Turbonilla tia Bartsch, 1926
- Turbonilla tiara May, 1911
- Turbonilla tiganourana Nomura, 1936
- Turbonilla tikkoensis Nomura, 1936
- Turbonilla tincta Sowerby III, 1900
- † Turbonilla tokaidoensis Nomura, 1939
- Turbonilla tolteca Baker, Hanna & Strong, 1928
- Turbonilla tonbensis Nomura, 1939
- Turbonilla tongaensis Peñas & Rolán, 2010
- Turbonilla toniperezi Peñas & Rolán, 2010
- Turbonilla torquata (Gould, 1853)
- Turbonilla torresiana (Laseron, 1959)
- Turbonilla townsendi Melvill, 1910
- Turbonilla toyatani Henderson & Bartsch, 1914
- Turbonilla traveli Peñas & Rolán, 2010
- Turbonilla tremperi Bartsch, 1917
- Turbonilla tridentata (Carpenter, 1864)
- Turbonilla truncatelloides E. A. Smith, 1890
- † Turbonilla tubaui Peñas & Rolán, 2010
- Turbonilla tuberculosa Nomura, 1939
- Turbonilla tuckeri Peñas & Rolán, 2010
- Turbonilla tugelae Barnard, 1963
- Turbonilla tupinamba Pimenta & Absalão, 2002
- † Turbonilla turella (Melleville, 1843)

=== U-Z ===
- Turbonilla uaca Pimenta & Absalao, 2004
- Turbonilla uespi Peñas & Rolán, 2010
- Turbonilla ulloa Bartsch, 1917
- Turbonilla ulyssi Hertlein & Strong, 1951
- Turbonilla umbrina Melvill, 1918
- Turbonilla undata (Carpenter, 1857)
- † Turbonilla undecimcostata Pilsbry & C. W. Johnson, 1917
- † Turbonilla undulata Koenen, 1882
- Turbonilla unicincta Melvill, 1910
- Turbonilla unifasciata (Carpenter, 1857)
- Turbonilla urdeneta Bartsch, 1917
- Turbonilla urgorrii Peñas & Rolán, 2010
- Turbonilla ursula Thiele, 1925
- Turbonilla uruguayensis Pilsbry, 1897
- Turbonilla utuana Hertlein & Strong, 1951
- Turbonilla vaghena Peñas & Rolán, 2010
- Turbonilla vaillanti (Dautzenberg & Fischer H., 1896)
- Turbonilla valdeobesa Peñas & Rolán, 2010
- Turbonilla valida Verrill & Bush, 1900
- Turbonilla vallata Melvill, 1912
- Turbonilla vana (Laseron, 1951)
- Turbonilla vanae (Saurin, 1959)
- Turbonilla vancouverensis (Baird, 1863)
- Turbonilla varicifera Tate, 1898
- Turbonilla varicosa (A. Adams, 1855)
- Turbonilla vatilau Peñas & Rolán, 2010
- Turbonilla vegrandis (Laws, 1937)
- Turbonilla velaini Tryon, 1886
- Turbonilla venusta Issel, 1869
- Turbonilla venustula A. Adams, 1860
- Turbonilla verecunda (Laws, 1937)
- Turbonilla veronica Thiele, 1925
- Turbonilla verrilli Bartsch, 1909
- Turbonilla vesperis Pilsbry & Lowe, 1932
- Turbonilla vestae Hertlein & Strong, 1951
- Turbonilla vexativa Dall & Bartsch, 1909
- Turbonilla vigilia (Laws, 1937)
- Turbonilla villeni Peñas & Rolán, 2010
- Turbonilla villi Peñas & Rolán, 2010
- Turbonilla vincula (Laseron, 1959)
- Turbonilla vinhi Saurin, 1959
- Turbonilla virga Dall, 1884
- Turbonilla virgata Dall, 1892
- Turbonilla virginica Henderson & Bartsch, 1914
- Turbonilla virginieherosae Peñas & Rolán, 2010
- Turbonilla virgo (Carpenter, 1864)
- Turbonilla virgulinoi Silva-Absalao, Dos Santos & De Olivera, 2003
- Turbonilla viridaria Dall, 1884
- Turbonilla viscainoi Bartsch, 1917
- Turbonilla vitilevu Peñas & Rolán, 2010
- Turbonilla vivesi Hertlein & Strong, 1951
- Turbonilla vix Pimenta & Absalão, 1998
- † Turbonilla waikura Marwick, 1931
- Turbonilla waitemata (Laws, 1937)
- Turbonilla walpole Peñas & Rolán, 2010
- Turbonilla weldi Dall & Bartsch, 1909
- Turbonilla westermanni De Jong & Coomans, 1988
- Turbonilla wetmorei Strong & Hertlein, 1937
- Turbonilla whiteavesi Bartsch, 1909
- Turbonilla wickhami Dall & Bartsch, 1909
- Turbonilla willaseni Lygre, Kongsrud & Schander, 2011
- Turbonilla willetti Smith & Gordon, 1948
- Turbonilla wrightsvillensis E. N. Powell, 1983
- Turbonilla xartoi Peñas & Rolán, 2010
- Turbonilla yolettae Hertlein & Strong, 1951
- Turbonilla zacae Hertlein & Strong, 1951
- Turbonilla zatoi Nomura, 1936
- Turbonilla zealandica (Hutton, 1883)
- Turbonilla zulmae Pimenta & Absalão, 1998

== Synonyms ==
The following species were brought into synonymy:

List of synonyms
- Turbonilla aartseni Schander, 1994: synonym of Turbonilla melvilli Dautzenberg, 1912
- Turbonilla abrardi (Fischer-Piette & Nicklès, 1946): synonym of Pyrgiscus abrardi (Fischer-Piette & Nicklès, 1946)
- Turbonilla abrupta Clessin, 1902: synonym of Turbonilla nesiotes Pimenta & Absalão, 1998
- Turbonilla acosta Bartsch, 1919: synonym of Derjuginella rufofasciata (E.A. Smith, 1875)
- Turbonilla acuticostata (Jeffteys, 1884): synonym of Turbonilla postacuticostata Sacco, 1892
- Turbonilla admiranda Tate & May, 1900: synonym of Turbonilla fusca (A. Adams, 1855)
- Turbonilla affectuosa (Yokoyama, 1927): synonym of Parthenina affectuosa (Yokoyama, 1927)
- Turbonilla aglaia Bartsch, 1915: synonym of Polyspirella aglaia (Bartsch, 1915)
- Turbonilla albella Lovén, 1846: synonym of Odostomia unidentata (Montagu, 1803)
- Turbonilla albella A. Adams, 1861: synonym of Turbonilla orientica Corgan, 1970
- Turbonilla alma Thiele, 1925: synonym of Nisiturris alma (Thiele, 1925)
- Turbonilla ambigua Weinkauff, 1868: synonym of Chrysallida emaciata (Brusina, 1866): synonym of Parthenina emaciata (Brusina, 1866)
- Turbonilla ambulatia (Laseron, 1951): synonym of Asmunda ambulatia (Laseron, 1951)
- Turbonilla anfraconvex Peñas & Rolán, 2010: synonym of Nisiturris anfraconvex (Peñas & Rolán, 2010)
- Turbonilla angulifera Yokoyama, 1922: synonym of Aclis angulifera (Yokoyama, 1922)
- Turbonilla angusta (P. P. Carpenter, 1864): synonym of Chrysallida angusta P. P. Carpenter, 1864
- Turbonilla angusta Thiele, 1925: synonym of Turbonilla magister van Aartsen & Corgan, 1996
- Turbonilla angustissima Melvill, 1904: synonym of Nisiturris angustissima (Melvill, 1904)
- Turbonilla areolata A. E. Verrill, 1873: synonym of Turbonilla interrupta (Totten, 1835)
- Turbonilla attenuata (Jeffreys, 1884): synonym of Turbonilla micans (Monterosato, 1875)
- Turbonilla bahiensis (Castellanos, 1982): synonym of Careliopsis bahiensis (Castellanos, 1982)
- Turbonilla bartschi Aguayo & Rehder, 1936: synonym of Bacteridium bermudense (Dall & Bartsch, 1911)
- Turbonilla bathyraphe Sowerby III, 1901: synonym of Peristichia bathyraphe (Sowerby III, 1901)
- Turbonilla bedoti Dautzenberg, 1912: synonym of Turbonilla subulina Monterosato, 1889
- Turbonilla bella Dall & Bartsch, 1906: synonym of Turbonilla varicosa (A. Adams, 1855)
- Turbonilla brevis Pritchard & Gatliff, 1900: synonym of Linopyrga brevis (Pritchard & Gatliff, 1900)
- Turbonilla buttoni Dautzenberg, 1912: synonym of Turbonilla penasi Nofroni & Gubbioli, 2000
- Turbonilla caelatior Dall & Bartsch, 1906: synonym of Babella caelatior (Dall & Bartsch, 1906)
- Turbonilla callista Bartsch, 1915: synonym of Polyspirella callista (Bartsch, 1915)
- Turbonilla cancellata W.H. Turton, 1932: synonym of Pyrgiscus altenai van Aartsen & Corgan, 1996
- Turbonilla candida de Folin, 1870: synonym of Syrnola etiennei (Dautzenberg, 1912)
- Turbonilla cayucosensis Willett, 1929: synonym of Turbonilla gabbiana (J. G. Cooper, 1867)
- Turbonilla chitaniana Yokoyama, 1926: synonym of Acirsa chitaniana (Yokoyama, 1926)
- Turbonilla cingulata Dunker, 1860: synonym of Cingulina cingulata (Dunker, 1860)
- Turbonilla clavula Lovén, 1846: synonym of Liostomia clavula (Lovén, 1846)
- Turbonilla compressa (Jeffreys, 1884): synonym of Turbonilla amoena (Monterosato, 1878)
- Turbonilla convexiuscula Golikov, 1967: synonym of Turbonilla candida (A. Adams, 1855)
- Turbonilla corintoensis [sic] : synonym of Turbonilla corintonis Hertlein & A. M. Strong, 1951
- Turbonilla cornelliana (Newcomb, 1870): synonym of Turbonilla varicosa (A. Adams, 1855)
- † Turbonilla costulata Risso, 1826: synonym of Turbonilla lactea (Linnaeus, 1758)
- Turbonilla crebrifilata (Carpenter, 1865): synonym of Turbonilla tenuicula (Gould, 1853)
- Turbonilla crenata (Brown, 1827): synonym of Pyrgiscus crenatus (Brown, 1827)
- Turbonilla crenulifera Tate, 1892: synonym of Turbonilla beddomei (Petterd, 1884)
- Turbonilla crystallina Dall & Bartsch, 1906: synonym of Nisiturris crystallina (Dall & Bartsch, 1906)
- Turbonilla darnleyensis (Brazier, 1877): synonym of Nisiturris darnleyensis (Brazier, 1877)
- Turbonilla decussata Pease, 1861: synonym of Turbonilla varicosa (A. Adams, 1855)
- Turbonilla delicata (Monterosato, 1874): synonym of Turbonilla acuta (Donovan, 1804)
- Turbonilla delli Powell, 1976: synonym of Planpyrgiscus lawsi Dell, 1956
- Turbonilla delpretei Sulliotti, 1889: synonym of Parthenina indistincta (Montagu, 1808)
- Turbonilla densecostata (Philippi, 1844): synonym of Pyrgiscus rufus (Philippi, 1836)
- Turbonilla dextra Saurin, 1959: synonym of Exesilla dextra (Saurin, 1959)
- Turbonilla diezi Peñas & Rolán, 1997: synonym of Nisiturris diezi (Peñas & Rolán, 1997)
- Turbonilla digenes Dautzenberg & Fischer H., 1896: synonym of Eulimella digenes (Dautzenberg & Fischer, 1896)
- Turbonilla edgari [sic]: synonym of Turbonilla edgarii (Melvill, 1896)
- Turbonilla elegans (d'Orbigny, 1841): synonym of Turbonilla elegantula A. E. Verrill, 1882
- Turbonilla elegantula (A. Adams, 1860): synonym of Asmunda elegantula (A. Adams, 1860)
- Turbonilla elizabethae Pilsbry, 1918: synonym of Styloptygma lacteola Preston, 1903
- Turbonilla elongata Castellanos, 1982: synonym of Turbonilla zulmae Pimenta & Absalão, 1998
- Turbonilla elongata Pease, 1867: synonym of Turbonilla aulica Dall & Bartsch, 1906
- Turbonilla emaciata Brusina, 1866: synonym of Chrysallida emaciata (Brusina, 1866)
- Turbonilla engli Peñas & Rolán, 1997: synonym of Afroturbonilla engli (Peñas & Rolán, 1997)
- Turbonilla erna Thiele, 1925: synonym of Pyrgiscus thielei van Aartsen & Corgan, 1996
- Turbonilla eumenes Melvill, 1910: synonym of Pyrgiscus eumenes (Melvill, 1910)
- Turbonilla evermanni Baker, Hanna & Strong, 1928: synonym of Cingulina evermanni (Baker, Hanna & Strong, 1928)
- Turbonilla exilissima Nomura, 1938: synonym of Asmunda exilissima (Nomura, 1938)
- Turbonilla falcifera (Watson, 1881): synonym of Tragula falcifera (R. B. Watson, 1881)
- Turbonilla fernandezantoni Peñas & Rolán, 2010: synonym of Nisiturris fernandezantoni (Peñas & Rolán, 2010)
- Turbonilla filiola Yokoyama, 1927: synonym of Iravadia yendoi (Yokoyama, 1927)
- Turbonilla fluminensis Pimenta & Absalao, 2004: synonym of Nisiturris fluminensis (Pimenta & Absalão, 2004)
- Turbonilla formosa (Jeffreys, 1848): synonym of Turbonilla bushiana A. E. Verrill, 1882
- Turbonilla formosa scalaroides F. Nordsieck, 1972: synonym of Pyrgiscus rufus (Philippi, 1836)
- Turbonilla franciscoi Peñas & Rolán, 1997: synonym of Turbolidium franciscoi (Peñas & Rolán, 1997)
- Turbonilla fulvocincta Thompson, 1840: synonym of Turbonilla rufa (Philippi, 1836)
- Turbonilla gabrieli Hedley, 1910: synonym of Nisiturris gabrieli (Hedley, 1910)
- Turbonilla galatea Bartsch, 1967 : synonym of Turbonilla candida (A. Adams, 1855)
- Turbonilla gisela Thiele, 1925: synonym of Exesilla gisela (Thiele, 1925)
- Turbonilla gracillima Gabb, 1865: synonym of Chemnitzia gabbiana J.G. Cooper, 1867
- Turbonilla grossa Marshall, 1894: synonym of Turbonilla sinuosa (Jeffreys, 1884)
- Turbonilla gruveli var. multicostata Dautzenberg, 1912: synonym of Turbonilla gruveli Dautzenberg, 1912
- Turbonilla hannoni Pallary, 1912: synonym of Turbonilla pumila Seguenza G., 1876
- Turbonilla hannoni Pallary, 1920: synonym of Turbonilla subulina Monterosato, 1889
- Turbonilla haroldi Laws, 1937: preoccupied by Turbonilla haroldi E. A. Smith, 1890, but no replacement name has been proposed (April 2015)
- Turbonilla hebridarum Peñas & Rolán, 2010: synonym of Pyrgiscus hebridarum (Peñas & Rolán, 2010)
- Turbonilla helena Bartsch, 1915: synonym of Pyrgiscus ninettae van Aartsen & Corgan, 1996
- Turbonilla helena Thiele, 1925: synonym of Turbonilla indonesiae van Aartsen & Corgan, 1996
- Turbonilla hemphilli Bartsch, 1917: synonym of Turbonilla vix Pimenta & Absalão, 1998
- Turbonilla hiradoensis var. badia Pilsbry, 1904: synonym of Turbonilla hiradoensis Pilsbry, 1904
- Turbonilla hoecki (Dautzenberg & Fischer H., 1896): synonym of Turbonilla hoeki (Dautzenberg & Fischer H., 1896)
- Turbonilla hortensia Thiele, 1925: synonym of Pyrgulina tenerrima (Melvill, 1906)
- Turbonilla humboldti Risso, 1826: synonym of Euparthenia humboldti (Risso, 1826)
- Turbonilla incisa Bush: synonym of Houbricka incisa (Bush, 1899)
- Turbonilla incisa var. contricta K. J. Bush, 18999: synonym of Houbricka incisa (K. J. Bush, 1899)
- Turbonilla inclinata Bush: synonym of Turbonilla penistoni Bush, 1899
- Turbonilla inclinella Corgan & Van Aartsen, 1998: synonym of Nisiturris obliqua (Saurin, 1959)
- Turbonilla indistincta (Montagu, 1808): synonym of Chrysallida indistincta (Montagu, 1808)
- Turbonilla infans (Laseron, 1951): synonym of Graphis infans (Laseron, 1951)
- Turbonilla innovata Monterosato, 1884: synonym of Turbonilla pumila Seguenza G., 1876
- Turbonilla internodula (S.V. Wood, 1848): synonym of Pyrgolidium internodulum (S. V. Wood, 1848)
- Turbonilla iredalei (Laseron, 1959): synonym of Tathrella iredalei Laseron, 1959
- Turbonilla irma Thiele, 1925: synonym of Pyrgiscus irma (Thiele, 1925)
- Turbonilla isseli Tryon, 1886: synonym of Cingulina isseli (Tryon, 1886)
- Turbonilla jansseni van Aartsen, 1981: synonym of Turbonilla postacuticostata Sacco, 1892
- Turbonilla jeffreysii (Jeffreys, 1848): synonym of Pyrgiscus jeffreysii (Jeffreys, 1848)
- Turbonilla jozinae van Aartsen & Corgan, 1996: synonym of Graphis africana Bartsch, 1915
- Turbonilla kahoolawensis Pilsbry, 1918: synonym of Turbonilla lirata (A. Adams, 1855)
- Turbonilla kauaiensis Pilsbry, 1918: synonym of Turbonilla lirata (A. Adams, 1855)
- Turbonilla kobelti Dautzenberg, 1912: synonym of Eulimella kobelti (Dautzenberg, 1912)
- Turbonilla kraussi Clessin, 1900: synonym of Turbonilla kraussii H. Adams & A. Adams, 1853
- Turbonilla krumpermani De Jong & Coomans, 1988: synonym of Trabecula krumpermani (De Jong & Coomans, 1988)
- Turbonilla laysanensis Pilsbry, 1918: synonym of Styloptygma lacteola Preston, 1903
- Turbonilla limitum Brusina in de Folin & Périer, 1876: synonym of Chrysallida limitum (Brusina in de Folin & Périer, 1876): synonym of Parthenina limitum (Brusina in de Folin & Périer, 1876)
- Turbonilla lordi (E. A. Smith, 1880): synonym of Turbonilla lordii (E. A. Smith, 1880)
- Turbonilla ludovica Thiele, 1925: synonym of Asmunda ludovica (Thiele, 1925)
- Turbonilla lydia Thiele, 1925: synonym of Turbonilla crystallina Dall & Bartsch, 1906
- Turbonilla mabutii Nomura, 1938: synonym of Pyrgiscilla mabutii (Nomura, 1938): synonym of Pyrgiscus mabutii (Nomura, 1938)
- Turbonilla manorae Melvill, 1898: synonym of Turbonilla mumia (A. Adams, 1861)
- Turbonilla marteli Dautzenberg, 1912: synonym of Turbonilla haullevillei Dautzenberg, 1912
- Turbonilla microscopica Laseron, 1959: synonym of Turbonilla mumia (A. Adams, 1861)
- Turbonilla miyagiensis Nomura, 1936: synonym of Turbonilla aulica Dall & Bartsch, 1906
- Turbonilla modesta C. B. Adams, 1851: synonym of Turbonilla rixtae De Jong & Coomans, 1988
- Turbonilla modica A. Adams, 1860: synonym of Syrnola modica (A. Adams, 1860)
- Turbonilla monocycla A. Adams, 1860: synonym of Parthenina pagodula (A. Adams, 1860)
- Turbonilla morsei Yokoyama, 1926: synonym of Acirsa morsei (Yokoyama, 1926)
- Turbonilla multigyrata Dunker, 1882: synonym of Turbonilla candida (A. Adams, 1855)
- Turbonilla nitida Angas, 1867: synonym of Turbonilla hofmani Angas, 1877
- Turbonilla nitidissima Issel, 1869: synonym of Costosyrnola nitidissima (Issel, 1869)
- Turbonilla normalis Corgan & Van Aartsen, 1998: synonym of Turbonilla ambigua (Saurin, 1962)
- Turbonilla obeliscus Gould, 1861: synonym of Turbonilla secura Dall & Bartsch, 1906
- Turbonilla oblectamentum Pilsbry, 1918: synonym of Turbonilla lirata (A. Adams, 1855)
- Turbonilla obliquastructionis Peñas & Rolán, 2010: synonym of Nisiturris obliquastructionis (Peñas & Rolán, 2010)
- Turbonilla obliquata var. gallica Sacco, 1892: synonym of Turbonilla obliquata (Philippi, 1844)
- Turbonilla obliquecostata Dautzenberg, 1912: synonym of Turbonilla subulina Monterosato, 1889
- Turbonilla octona Guppy, 1896: synonym of Bacteridium resticulum (Dall, 1889)
- Turbonilla oscitans Lovén, 1846: synonym of Odostomia eulimoides Hanley, 1844 represented as Brachystomia eulimoides (Hanley, 1844)
- Turbonilla pallaryi Dautzenberg, 1910: synonym of Turbonilla pumila Seguenza G., 1876
- Turbonilla pallaryi Nordsieck, 1972: synonym of Turbonilla syrtensis van Aartsen, 1981
- Turbonilla palmerae Aguayo & Jaume, 1936: synonym of Turbonilla krebsii (Mörch, 1875)
- Turbonilla peasei Dall & Bartsch, 1906: synonym of Turbonilla aulica Dall & Bartsch, 1906
- Turbonilla pellucida (Sowerby III, 1897): synonym of Polyspirella pellucida (Sowerby III, 1897)
- Turbonilla pellucida var. affinis W. H. Turton, 1932: synonym of Polyspirella pellucida (G. B. Sowerby III, 1897)
- Turbonilla perexilis W. H. Turton, 1932: synonym of Graphis africana Bartsch, 1915
- Turbonilla perscalata Hedley, 1909: synonym of Linopyrga perscalata (Hedley, 1909)
- Turbonilla petri Bartsch, 1919: synonym of Derjuginella rufofasciata (E.A. Smith, 1875)
- Turbonilla phaula Dautzenberg & Fischer H., 1896: synonym of Eulimella phaula (Dautzenberg & H. Fischer, 1896)
- Turbonilla philippiana Dunker, 1860: synonym of Mormula philippiana (Dunker, 1860)
- Turbonilla pilsbryi Bush, 1899: synonym of Turbonilla riisei (Mørch, 1875)
- Turbonilla planulata Thiele, 1930: synonym of Turbonilla bayensis van Aartsen & Corgan, 1996
- Turbonilla pointeli de Folin, 1868: synonym of Ebala pointeli (de Folin, 1868)
- Turbonilla polita (A. E. Verrill, 1872): synonym of Eulimella polita (A. E. Verrill, 1872)
- Turbonilla portseaensis Gatliff & Gabriel, 1911: synonym of Linopyrga portseaensis (Gatliff & Gabriel, 1911)
- Turbonilla princeps Preston, 1905: synonym of Terenolla pygmaea (Hinds, 1844)
- Turbonilla prolongata W.H. Turton, 1932: synonym of Pyrgiscus prolongatus (W.H. Turton, 1932)
- Turbonilla protracta Dall, 1892: synonym of Turbonilla ornata (d'Orbigny, 1840)
- Turbonilla pseudocura Nomura, 1938: synonym of Turbonilla dunkeri Clessin, 1902
- Turbonilla pseudogradata F. Nordsieck, 1972: synonym of Turbonilla gradata Bucquoy, Dautzenberg & Dollfus, 1883
- Turbonilla pseudostricta F. Nordsieck, 1972: synonym of Turbonilla pumila Seguenza G., 1876
- Turbonilla punctiperpherarta [sic]: synonym of Turbonilla punctiperipherata Nomura, 1936
- Turbonilla punicea Okutani, 1964: synonym of Turbonilla corgani Okutani, 1968
- Turbonilla pupoides var. ischna K. J. Bush, 18999: synonym of Turbonilla pupoides (d'Orbigny, 1841)
- Turbonilla pusilla var. lactoides Chaster, 1898: synonym of Turbonilla pusilla (Philippi, 1844)
- Turbonilla pusilla var. rectogallica Sacco, 1892 accepted as Turbonilla rectogallica Sacco, 1892
- Turbonilla pygmaea Brusina, 1865: synonym of Chrysallida emaciata (Brusina, 1866): synonym of Parthenina emaciata (Brusina, 1866)
- Turbonilla qenenoji Peñas & Rolán, 2010: synonym of Turbolidium qenenoji (Peñas & Rolán, 2010)
- Turbonilla ratisukunai Peñas & Rolán, 2010: synonym of Turbonilla ratusukunai Peñas & Rolán, 2010
- Turbonilla romeasaina [sic]: synonym of Turbonilla romeasiana Saurin, 1962
- Turbonilla rosea von Maltzan, 1885: synonym of Turbonilla internodula (S. V. Wood, 1848)
- Turbonilla rufa (Philippi, 1836): synonym of Pyrgiscus rufus (Philippi, 1836)
- Turbonilla rufescens (Forbes, 1846): synonym of Pyrgiscus rufescens (Forbes, 1846)
- Turbonilla rugosa de Folin, 1870: synonym of Syrnola rugosa (de Folin, 1870)
- Turbonilla ryalli Peñas & Rolán, 1997: synonym of Nisiturris ryalli (Peñas & Rolán, 1997)
- Turbonilla salomonensis Peñas & Rolán, 2010: synonym of Turbonilla solomonensis Peñas & Rolán, 2010
- Turbonilla sanmatiense Castellanos, 1982: synonym of Turbonilla sanmatiensis Castellanos, 1982
- Turbonilla scalarina Brazier, 1894: synonym of Turbonilla beddomei (Petterd, 1884)
- Turbonilla scalaris (Philippi, 1836): synonym of Turbonilla jeffreysii (Jeffreys, 1848)
- Turbonilla scrobiculata Schander, 1994: synonym of Turbonilla angelinagagliniae Schander, 1997
- Turbonilla sculpturata W.H. Turton, 1932: synonym of Pyrgulina scripta van Aartsen & Corgan, 1996
- Turbonilla sculpturata Oliver, 1915: synonym of Graphis sculpturata (Oliver, 1915)
- Turbonilla sericea de Folin, 1868: synonym of Eulimella sericea (de Folin, 1868)
- Turbonilla smithi [sic]: synonym of Eulimella smithii (A. E. Verrill, 1880)
- Turbonilla smithi Strebel, 1905: synonym of Turbonilla strebeli Corgan, 1969
- Turbonilla smithii A. E. Verrill, 1880: synonym of Eulimella smithii (A. E. Verrill, 1880)
- Turbonilla sophia Thiele, 1925: synonym of Turbonilla tegulata G. B. Sowerby III, 1892
- Turbonilla speciosa A. Adams, 1860: synonym of Pyrgiscus speciosus (A. Adams, 1860)
- Turbonilla speciosa A. Adams, 1869: synonym of Turbonilla macandreae H. Adams, 1871
- Turbonilla stephanogyra Dall & Bartsch, 1909: synonym of Strioturbonilla stephanogyra (Dall & Bartsch, 1909) †
- Turbonilla striatula (Linnaeus, 1758): synonym of Pyrgostylus striatulus (Linnaeus, 1758)
- Turbonilla stricta Pallary, 1904: synonym of Turbonilla pumila Seguenza G., 1876
- Turbonilla stricta A. E. Verrill, 1873: synonym of Turbonilla nivea (Stimpson, 1851)
- Turbonilla stricta Clessin, 1902: synonym of Turbonilla sinensis Pimenta & Absalão, 1998
- Turbonilla striolata [sic]: synonym of Pyrgostylus striatulus (Linnaeus, 1758)
- Turbonilla subangulata (Carpenter, 1857): synonym of Bartschella subangulata (Carpenter, 1857)
- Turbonilla subulata (C. B. Adams, 1850): synonym of Turbonilla peilei Dall & Bartsch, 1911
- Turbonilla susanna Thiele, 1925: synonym of Nisipyrgiscus susanna (Thiele, 1925)
- Turbonilla swiftii Bush, 1899: synonym of Turbonilla penistoni Bush, 1899
- Turbonilla syrnoliformis Nomura, 1938: synonym of Ptycheulimella syrnoliformis (Nomura, 1938)
- Turbonilla tantilla var. megaembryo Hornung & Mermod, 1924: synonym of Turbonilla megaembryo Hornung & Mermod, 1924
- Turbonilla tasmanica Tenison Woods, 1876: synonym of Turbonilla beddomei (Petterd, 1884)
- Turbonilla tefunta Bartsch, 1915: synonym of Pyrgiscus tefunta (Bartsch, 1915)
- Turbonilla tenuis Pallary, 1904: synonym of Turbonilla rosewateri Corgan & van Aartsen, 1993
- Turbonilla tenuis W.H. Turton, 1932: synonym of Turbonilla jozinae van Aartsen & Corgan, 1996
- Turbonilla tenuissima Hedley, 1909: synonym of Graphis tenuissima (Hedley, 1909)
- Turbonilla terebra Dunker, 1860: synonym of Cingulina terebra (Dunker, 1860): synonym of Pseudocingulina terebra (Dunker, 1860)
- Turbonilla theresa Thiele, 1925: synonym of Turbonilla funiculata de Folin, 1868
- Turbonilla thornleyana Laseron, 1951: synonym of Graphis pellucida (Gatliff & Gabriel, 1911)
- Turbonilla tribulationis Hedley, 1909: synonym of Asmunda tribulationis (Hedley, 1909)
- Turbonilla tritonia Bartsch, 1915: synonym of Pyrgiscus tritonia (Bartsch, 1915)
- Turbonilla tumidulus de Folin, 1873: synonym of Turbonilla tumidula de Folin, 1873
- Turbonilla turrita (C. B. Adams, 1852): synonym of Asmunda turrita (C. B. Adams, 1852)
- Turbonilla umbilicaris Malm, 1863: synonym of Odostomia umbilicaris (Malm, 1863)
- Turbonilla unifasciata (Forbes, 1844): synonym of Tibersyrnola unifasciata (Forbes, 1844)
- Turbonilla unilirata Bush, 1899: synonym of Turbolidium uniliratum (Bush, 1899)
- Turbonilla varicosa Dunker, 1860: synonym of Turbonilla aulica Dall & Bartsch, 1906
- Turbonilla vitiensis Pilsbry, 1917: synonym of Turbonilla varicosa (A. Adams, 1855)
- Turbonilla vitiensis clavus Pilsbry, 1918: synonym of Turbonilla aulica Dall & Bartsch, 1906
- Turbonilla vladivostokensis Bartsch, 1929: synonym of Derjuginella rufofasciata (E.A. Smith, 1875)
- Turbonilla weinkauffi Dunker, 1862: synonym of Tragula fenestrata (Jeffreys, 1848)
- Turbonilla whitechurchi W.H. Turton, 1932: synonym of Pyrgulina whitechurchi (W.H. Turton, 1932)
- Turbonilla woodmassoni de Folin, 1879: synonym of Turbonilla woodmasoni de Folin, 1879
- Turbonilla xenophyes Melvill & Standen, 1912: synonym of Atomiscala xenophyes (Melvill & Standen, 1912)
- Turbonilla yanamii Yokoyama, 1926: synonym of Tachyrhynchus yanamii (Yokoyama, 1926)
- Turbonilla yoritomoi Nomura, 1938: synonym of Pyrgiscus yoritomoi (Nomura, 1938)
- Turbonilla zetemia Melvill, 1910: synonym of Nisipyrgiscus zetemia (Melvill, 1910)

== Taxa inquirenda ==
- Turbonilla abbreviata W. H. Turton, 1932
- Turbonilla admirabilis W. H. Turton, 1932
- Turbonilla becki W. H. Turton, 1932
- Turbonilla bifasciata A. Adams, 1861
- Turbonilla columna W. H. Turton, 1932
- Turbonilla distincta W. H. Turton, 1932
- Turbonilla erecta W. H. Turton, 1932
- Turbonilla intersecta W. H. Turton, 1932
- Turbonilla liratula W. H. Turton, 1932
- Turbonilla multistriata W. H. Turton, 1932
- Turbonilla retusa W. H. Turton, 1932
- Turbonilla perexilis W. H. Turton, 1932
- Turbonilla perminima W. H. Turton, 1932
- Turbonilla producta W. H. Turton, 1932
- Turbonilla rietensis W. H. Turton, 1932
- Turbonilla rufanensis W. H. Turton, 1932
- Turbonilla subcancellata W. H. Turton, 1932
- Turbonilla subconica W. H. Turton, 1932
- Turbonilla subglobosa W. H. Turton, 1932
