= Turbonilla magister =

Scientific classification
- Kingdom: Animalia
- Phylum: Mollusca
- Class: Gastropoda
- Family: Pyramidellidae
- Genus: Turbonilla
- Species: T. magister

Binomial name
- Turbonilla magister van Aartsen & Corgan, 1996

Synonyms
- Turbonilla angusta Thiele, 1925

Species of gastropod

Turbonilla magister is a species of sea snail, a marine gastropod mollusk in the family Pyramidellidae, the pyrams and their allies.
