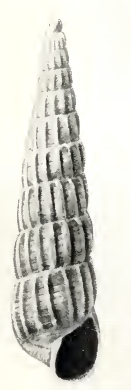
- Drawing of a shell of Turbonilla corsoensis

Scientific classification
- Kingdom: Animalia
- Phylum: Mollusca
- Class: Gastropoda
- Family: Pyramidellidae
- Genus: Turbonilla
- Species: T. corsoensis

Binomial name
- Turbonilla corsoensis Bartsch, 1917

Synonyms
- Turbonilla (Pyrgiscus) corsoensis Bartsch, 1917

= Turbonilla corsoensis =

Species of gastropod

Turbonilla corsoensis is a species of sea snail, a marine gastropod mollusk in the family Pyramidellidae, the pyrams and their allies.

== Description ==
The pale yellowish brown shell has an elongate conic shape . Its length measures 6.1 mm. The 2½ whorls of the protoconch are well rounded. They form a very depressed helicoid spire, the axis of which is at right angles to that of the succeeding turns in the first of which it is about one-fourth immersed. The 9½ whorls of the teleoconch are flattened in the middle, and slightly shouldered at the summit. They are marked by rather low, narrow, well-rounded, slightly retractively slanting axial ribs, of which 18 occur upon the first, 16 upon the second to fourth, and 18 upon the remaining turns. The ribs become slightly flattened and enfeebled toward the summit. The intercostal spaces are about 2½ times as wide as the ribs crossed by nine almost equally spaced incised spiral grooves, the first of which is about as far anterior to the summit as that is distant from the second. Of these lines the first and second are the weakest, while the fourth and ninth are the strongest, the rest being intermediate. In addition to this sculpture there are many fine incremental lines and equally fine spiral striations on the spire which give the surface a fine clothlike texture. The suture is well impressed. The periphery of the body whorl is well rounded. The base of the shell is short, and strongly rounded. It is marked by the feeble continuations of the axial ribs, which become evanescent before reaching its middle, and eight almost equal and equally spaced incised spiral lines. The aperture is broadly oval. The posterior angle is acute. The outer lip is thin, showing the external sculpture within. The inner lip is almost straight, oblique, somewhat revolute, and provided with a strong fold a little anterior to its insertion. The parietal wall is covered with a thick callus.

== Distribution ==
The type specimen was dredged in shallow water off Santa Maria Bay, Baja California.
