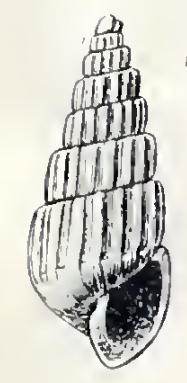
- Drawing of a shell of Turbonilla centrota

Scientific classification
- Kingdom: Animalia
- Phylum: Mollusca
- Class: Gastropoda
- Family: Pyramidellidae
- Genus: Turbonilla
- Species: T. centrota

Binomial name
- Turbonilla centrota Dall & Bartsch, 1909

Synonyms
- Chemnitzia acuminata C. B. Adams, 1853; Chrysallida acuminata C. B. Adams, 1863; Turbonilla (Turbonilla) centrota Dall & Bartsch, 1909

= Turbonilla centrota =

Species of gastropod

Turbonilla centrota is a species of sea snail, a marine gastropod mollusk in the family Pyramidellidae, the pyrams and their allies.

== Description ==
The milk-white shell has a very broadly conic shape. The length of the shell is 2.8 mm. It is tabulatedly shouldered. The 2½ whorls of the protoconch form a decidedly elevated spire, the axis of which is at right angles to that of the succeeding turns, in the first of which it is slightly immersed. The seven rounded whorls of the teleoconch have decidedly tabulated summits, and are constricted at the sutures. They are ornamented by strong, narrow, protractive axial ribs. Of these ribs 14 occur upon the first, 16 upon the second and third, 18 upon the fourth and fifth, and 20 upon the penultimate turn. The intercostal spaces are a little more than twice as wide as the ribs, well impressed, and terminate at the periphery. The sutures are very strongly marked. The periphery and the base of the body whorl are well rounded. They are marked by the continuations of the axial ribs. The aperture is oval. The posterior angle is acute. The outer lip is thin, showing the external sculpture within. The columella is slender, somewhat curved and slightly revolute.

== Distribution ==
This species occurs in the Pacific Ocean off Panama.
