= Turbonilla gemmula =

Scientific classification
- Kingdom: Animalia
- Phylum: Mollusca
- Class: Gastropoda
- Family: Pyramidellidae
- Genus: Turbonilla
- Species: T. gemmula

Binomial name
- Turbonilla gemmula E. A. Smith, 1904

Synonyms
- Turbonilla (Chemnitzia) gemmula E.A. Smith, 1904

Species of gastropod

Turbonilla gemmula is a species of sea snail, a marine gastropod mollusk in the family Pyramidellidae, the pyrams and their allies.
