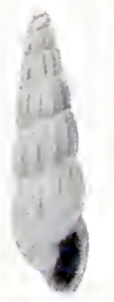
- Drawing of an apertural view of Turbonilla rimaca

Scientific classification
- Kingdom: Animalia
- Phylum: Mollusca
- Class: Gastropoda
- Family: Pyramidellidae
- Genus: Turbonilla
- Species: T. rimaca

Binomial name
- Turbonilla rimaca Bartsch, 1926

= Turbonilla rimaca =

Species of gastropod

Turbonilla rimaca is a species of sea snail, a marine gastropod mollusk in the family Pyramidellidae, the pyrams and their allies.
