= Turbonilla jorgei =

Scientific classification
- Kingdom: Animalia
- Phylum: Mollusca
- Class: Gastropoda
- Family: Pyramidellidae
- Genus: Turbonilla
- Species: T. jorgei

Binomial name
- Turbonilla jorgei Peñas & Rolán, 2010

Species of gastropod

Turbonilla jorgei is a species of sea snail, a marine gastropod mollusk in the family Pyramidellidae, the pyrams and their allies.

== Description ==
The length of the shell attains 6 mm.

== Distribution ==
This species occurs in the Pacific Ocean off the Solomons.
