= Turbonilla nodulyrata =

Scientific classification
- Kingdom: Animalia
- Phylum: Mollusca
- Class: Gastropoda
- Family: Pyramidellidae
- Genus: Turbonilla
- Species: T. nodulyrata

Binomial name
- Turbonilla nodulyrata Peñas & Rolán, 2010

Species of gastropod

Turbonilla nodulyrata is a species of micro-sea snail, a marine gastropod mollusk in the family Pyramidellidae, the pyrams and their allies.

== Description ==
The length of the shell attains 3.2 mm.

== Distribution ==
This species occurs in the Pacific Ocean off the Solomons.
