= Turbonilla leta =

Scientific classification
- Kingdom: Animalia
- Phylum: Mollusca
- Class: Gastropoda
- Family: Pyramidellidae
- Genus: Turbonilla
- Species: T. leta

Binomial name
- Turbonilla leta Bartsch, 1927

Synonyms
- Pyrgiscus leta Bartsch, 1927; Turbonilla (Strioturbonilla) leta Bartsch, 1927

Species of gastropod

Turbonilla leta is a species of sea snail, a marine gastropod mollusk in the family Pyramidellidae, the pyrams and their allies.

== Description ==
The shell grows to a length of 3 mm.

== Distribution ==
This species occurs in the Atlantic Ocean off Georgia and Florida.
