= Turbonilla electra =

Scientific classification
- Kingdom: Animalia
- Phylum: Mollusca
- Class: Gastropoda
- Family: Pyramidellidae
- Genus: Turbonilla
- Species: T. electra

Binomial name
- Turbonilla electra Bartsch, 1927

Synonyms
- Pyrgiscus electra (Bartsch, 1927); Turbonilla (Strioturbonilla) electra Bartsch, 1927

Species of gastropod

Turbonilla electra is a species of sea snail, a marine gastropod mollusk in the family Pyramidellidae, the pyrams and their allies.

== Description ==
The shell grows to a length of 7 mm.

== Distribution ==
This species occurs in the Atlantic Ocean off Georgia, USA, at a depth of 538 m.
