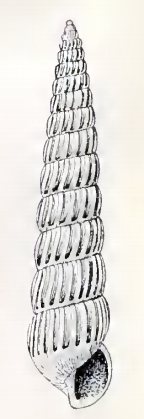
- Drawing of a shell of Turbonilla hypolispa

Scientific classification
- Kingdom: Animalia
- Phylum: Mollusca
- Class: Gastropoda
- Family: Pyramidellidae
- Genus: Turbonilla
- Species: T. hypolispa

Binomial name
- Turbonilla hypolispa Dall & Bartsch, 1909

Synonyms
- Turbonilla (Chemnitzia) hypolispa Dall & Bartsch, 1909

= Turbonilla hypolispa =

Species of gastropod

Turbonilla hypolispa is a species of sea snail, a marine gastropod mollusk in the family Pyramidellidae, the pyrams and their allies.

== Description ==
The broadly conic shell is yellowish-white. The 2½ whorls of the protoconch are very small. They form a rather elevated helicoid spire. Its axis is at right angles to that of the succeeding turns, in the first of which it is a little more than half immersed. The 11 whorls of the teleoconch are well rounded, and slightly shouldered at the summit. They are marked by very strong, sublamellar, protractive axial ribs, of which 14 occur upon the second and third, 16 upon the fourth to eighth, 18 upon the ninth and tenth, 20 upon the eleventh, 24 upon the twelfth, and 25 upon the penultimate turn. On the early whorls these ribs are very strong in the middle, bending suddenly toward the summit, which gives them a decidedly angulated appearance a little below their termination. On the last three whorls they are more closely crowded and less strongly developed. The intercostal spaces are about one and one-half times as wide as the ribs on the early whorls. On the last three they are about equal to them, well impressed, and terminating a little above the sutures. The sutures are well marked. The periphery of the body whorl is slightly angulated. The base of the shell is short, and well rounded. The aperture is rhomboidal. The columella is slender, somewhat curved, and slightly reflected.

== Distribution ==
The type species was found in the Pacific Ocean off San Diego, California.
