= Turbonilla vatilau =

Scientific classification
- Kingdom: Animalia
- Phylum: Mollusca
- Class: Gastropoda
- Family: Pyramidellidae
- Genus: Turbonilla
- Species: T. vatilau

Binomial name
- Turbonilla vatilau Peñas & Rolán, 2010

Species of gastropod

Turbonilla vatilau is a species of sea snail, a marine gastropod mollusk in the family Pyramidellidae, the pyrams and their allies. The group as a whole is characterized by a narrow, spiraling conical shell, typically a few centimeters in length.
