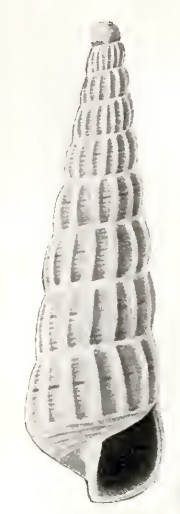
- Drawing of a shell of Turbonilla lamna

Scientific classification
- Kingdom: Animalia
- Phylum: Mollusca
- Class: Gastropoda
- Family: Pyramidellidae
- Genus: Turbonilla
- Species: T. lamna

Binomial name
- Turbonilla lamna Bartsch, 1917

Synonyms
- Turbonilla (Pyrgiscus) lamna Bartsch, 1917

= Turbonilla lamna =

Species of gastropod

Turbonilla lamna is a species of sea snail, a marine gastropod mollusk in the family Pyramidellidae, the pyrams and their allies.

== Description ==
The yellowish white shell has a regularly, broadly elongate conic shape. Its length measures 5.2 mm. The 2½ smooth whorls of the protoconch form a decidedly depressed helicoid spire. Its axis is at right angles to that of the succeeding turns in the first of which about one-fourth of the side of the spire is immersed. The 8¼ whorls of the teleoconch are well rounded. They are appressed at the summit. They are ornamented by weak, distantly spaced, somewhat protractive axial ribs, which become flattened and decidedly enfeebled near the summit. Of these ribs 20 occur upon the first and 18 upon the remaining turns. The shallow intercostal spaces are about three times as wide as the ribs, crossed by 13 slender incised spiral lines of somewhat varying width. Of these lines the first to fifth, seventh and twelfth are mere incised lines, while the sixth, eighth, tenth, and eleventh are about twice as wide as these, and the ninth and thirteenth are double the width of the last. The space between the summit and the first is as wide as the space between the eighth and ninth, which is doubly as wide as that separating the first five lines, which are subequally spaced. The spaces between the eighth and ninth, ninth and tenth, tenth and eleventh, and eleventh and twelfth increase steadily in width, the space between the first of this series being about one-half as wide as that separating the last. The suture is moderately constricted. The periphery of the body whorl is angulated. The base of the shell is short, and well rounded. It is marked by the feeble continuations of the axial ribs, which become evanescent before reaching the middle of the base, and 12 feebly incised, slender, wavy, spiral striations, which become successively weaker and closer spaced from the periphery toward the umbilical area. The aperture is subquadrate. The posterior angle is obtuse. The outer lip is thin. The inner lip is slender, slightly twisted, and provided with a very oblique fold a little anterior to its insertion. The parietal wall is glazed with a thin callus.

== Distribution ==
The type specimen was found in the Pacific Ocean off Santa Maria Bay, Baja California peninsula
