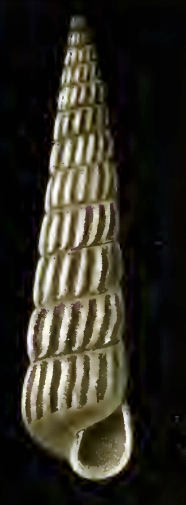
- Drawing of a shell of Turbonilla approximata

Scientific classification
- Kingdom: Animalia
- Phylum: Mollusca
- Class: Gastropoda
- Family: Pyramidellidae
- Genus: Turbonilla
- Species: T. approximata

Binomial name
- Turbonilla approximata Dall & Bartsch, 1906

Synonyms
- Turbonilla (Chemnitzia) approximata (Dall & Bartsch, 1906)

= Turbonilla approximata =

Species of gastropod

Turbonilla approximata is a species of sea snail, a marine gastropod mollusk in the family Pyramidellidae, the pyrams and their allies.

== Description ==
The white shell has a tapering, elongate-conic shape. Its length measures 8.2 mm. The whorls of the protoconch are decollated. The 13 whorls of the teleoconch are flattened, slightly shouldered, and ornamented by strong, rather narrow, oblique, axial ribs. These are distinct at the summit but fuse at the periphery. Twelve of these ribs appear on the first, fifteen upon the fifth, eighteen upon the tenth, and twenty-two upon the penultimate whorl. The intercostal spaces are a little wider than the ribs, decidedly depressed, and terminating suddenly at the periphery. The summit of the succeeding whorls falls a little anterior to the termination of the intercostal spaces and leaves a very narrow smooth area above the well-marked sutures. The periphery of the body whorl is very slightly angulated. The base of the shell is moderately long and well rounded. The subquadrate aperture is moderately large. The posterior angle is acute. The outer lip is thin, showing the external sculpture within by transmitted light. The columella is slender, oblique, and somewhat revolute. The columellar fold is not apparent in the aperture. The parietal wall is covered by a thin film of callus.

== Distribution ==
This species occurs in the pacific Ocean off Japan and the Solomon Islands.
