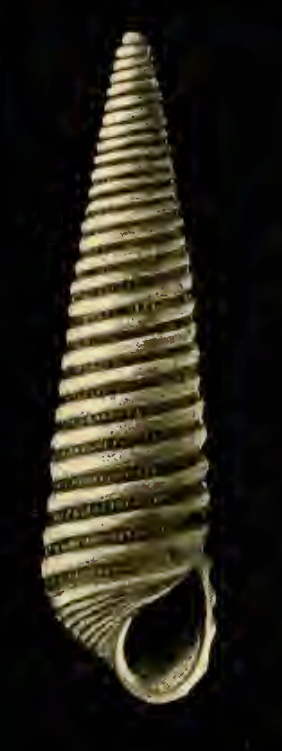
- Cingulina cingulata shell

Scientific classification
- Kingdom: Animalia
- Phylum: Mollusca
- Class: Gastropoda
- Family: Pyramidellidae
- Subfamily: Turbonillinae
- Tribe: Cingulinini
- Genus: Cingulina; A. Adams, 1860

Type species
- Cingulina circinata A. Adams, 1860

Synonyms
- Turbonilla (Cingulina) A. Adams, 1860

= Cingulina =

Genus of gastropods

Cingulina is a genus of small sea snails, pyramidellid gastropod mollusks. in the family Pyramidellidae, the pyrams and their allies.

== Description ==
The shell is turriculated and subulate. The numerous whorls are rounded and spirally ribbed. The interstices are striate. The aperture is oblong, entire in front. The columella is straight and simple. The outer lip is sharp and arcuate. The shell lacks basal keels, varices are absent. The spiral sculpture is stronger than microscopic striations. The axial sculpture consists of faint riblets, with the spiral markings consisting of strong raised threads.

== Distribution ==
This species is mainly distributed off the coasts of Japan and various European countries.

== Species ==
- Cingulina acutilirata G. B. Sowerby III, 1892
- Cingulina aikeni Poppe, Tagaro & Goto, 2018
- Cingulina archimedea Melvill, 1896
- Cingulina austrina Laseron, 1959
- Cingulina bellardii Hornung & Mermod, 1924
- Cingulina brazieri Angas, G.F., 1877
- Cingulina cingulata (Dunker, 1860)
- Cingulina circinata A. Adams, 1860
- Cingulina dussaulti Saurin, 1962
- Cingulina imperita Laseron, 1959
- Cingulina inaequalis Saurin, 1958
- Cingulina inamuragasakiensis Nomura, 1938
- Cingulina isseli (Tryon, 1886)
- Cingulina japonica Clessin, 1902
- Cingulina laticingula (Dall, W.H. & P. Bartsch, 1906)
- Cingulina magna Gatliff & Gabriel, 1910
- Cingulina pulchra (Brazier, 1894)
- Cingulina puncticingulata Nomura, 1938
- Cingulina rhyllensis Gatliff & Gabriel, 1910
- Cingulina rugosa Saurin, 1959
- Cingulina secernenda Melvill, 1918
- Cingulina spina (Crosse & Fischer, 1864)
- Cingulina superba Thiele, 1925
- † Cingulina tardichattica Lozouet, 1999
- Cingulina trisulcata Sowerby III, 1894
- Cingulina truncata Saurin, 1959

Species brought into synonymy

- Cingulina aglaia (Bartsch, 1915): synonym of Polyspirella aglaia (Bartsch, 1915)
- Cingulina australis Tenison-Woods, 1877: synonym of Lironoba australis (Tenison-Woods, 1877)
- Cingulina babylonia (C. B. Adams, 1845): synonym of Pseudoscilla babylonia (C. B. Adams, 1845)
- Cingulina biarata Nomura, 1937: synonym of Paracingulina triarata (Pilsbry, 1904)
- Cingulina callista (Bartsch, 1915): synonym of Polyspirella callista (Bartsch, 1915)
- Cingulina carinata Mörch, 1876: synonym of Teretinax carinata (Mörch, 1876)
- Cingulina densistriata Nomura, 1936: synonym of Murchisonella densistriata (Nomura, 1936) (original combination)
- Cingulina evermanni (Baker, Hanna & Strong, 1928): synonym of Murchisonella evermanni (F. Baker, Hanna & A. M. Strong, 1928)
- Cingulina inequicingulata (Nomura, 1938): synonym of Paracingulina inequicingulata (Nomura, 1938)
- Cingulina insignis May, 1911: synonym of Seila insignis (May, 1911)
- Cingulina laticingulata [sic]: synonym of Cingulina laticingula (Dall & Bartsch, 1906) (misspelling)
- Cingulina mutuwanensis Nomura, 1938: synonym of Cingulina cingulata (Dunker, 1860)
- Cingulina terebra (Dunker, 1860): synonym of Paracingulina terebra (Dunker, 1860)
- Cingulina torcularis (Tenison-Woods, 1878): synonym of Icuncula torcularis (Tenison-Woods, 1878)
- Cingulina trachealis (Gould, 1861): synonym of Polyspirella trachealis (Gould, 1861)
- Cingulina triarata Pilsbry, 1904: synonym of Paracingulina triarata (Pilsbry, 1904)
- Cingulina urdeneta (Bartsch, 1917): synonym of Turbonilla urdeneta Bartsch, 1917
