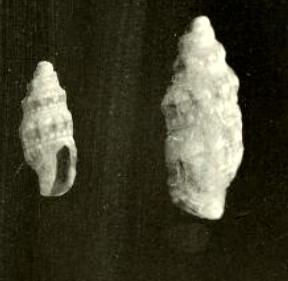
- Shell of Anachis remoensis (holotype)

Scientific classification
- Kingdom: Animalia
- Phylum: Mollusca
- Class: Gastropoda
- Subclass: Caenogastropoda
- Order: Neogastropoda
- Family: Columbellidae
- Genus: Anachis
- Species: A. remoensis

Binomial name
- Anachis remoensis (Gatliff & Gabriel, 1910)

Synonyms
- Columbella remoensis Gatliff & Gabriel, 1910 (original combination); Macrozafra remoensis (Gatliff & Gabriel, 1910); Pyrene remoensis (Gatliff & Gabriel, 1910); Zafra remoensis (Gatliff & Gabriel, 1910).

= Anachis remoensis =

Species of gastropod

Anachis remoensis is a species of sea snail in the family Columbellidae, the dove snails.

== Description ==
The length of the shell attains 3.75 mm, its diameter 1.5 mm.

(Original description) The shell is small and has 5.5 whorls. The protoconch consists of 2 smooth whorls, with a central brown spot located at the summit. The remaining whorls are ornamented with a peripheral band of rounded gemmules. There is a second band just above the suture, comprising much finer beads, and these are about four times as numerous. The body whorl features a third similar fine row, commencing just below the posterior portion of the columella and running around the dorsum to the edge of the outer lip.

The color of the shell is white, with the ornament appearing opaque on a translucent ground. The aperture is lanceolate. The siphonal canal is well open and slightly everted at its termination.

(Additional description by Verco) There is also an infrasutural row of tiny tubercles, due to the splitting of the row of large tubercles each into two. The ornament in the living shell consists of two translucent spiral bands, one on the spire-whorls between the large tubercles and the suprasutural, and winding round the body whorl to the centre of the outer lip, it is edged above with a broken brown hair line, and towards the lip becomes brown; the other winds round the base and over the snout, where it is mottled and streaked with brown.

== Distribution ==
This species is endemic to Australia and occurs off South Australia and Victoria.
