= Cingulina rhyllensis =

Scientific classification
- Kingdom: Animalia
- Phylum: Mollusca
- Class: Gastropoda
- Family: Pyramidellidae
- Genus: Cingulina
- Species: C. rhyllensis

Binomial name
- Cingulina rhyllensis Gatliff & Gabriel, 1910

Species of gastropod

Cingulina rhyllensis is a species of sea snail, a marine gastropod mollusk in the family Pyramidellidae, the pyrams and their allies.

== Distribution ==
This marine species occurs off the coasts of Victoria, Australia within the Bass Strait, between Victoria and Tasmania respectively.
