= Cingulina magna =

Scientific classification
- Kingdom: Animalia
- Phylum: Mollusca
- Class: Gastropoda
- Family: Pyramidellidae
- Genus: Cingulina
- Species: C. magna

Binomial name
- Cingulina magna Gatliff & Gabriel, 1910

Species of gastropod

Cingulina magna is a species of sea snail, a marine gastropod mollusk in the family Pyramidellidae, the pyrams and their allies.

== Distribution ==
This marine species occurs off the coasts of Victoria, Australia, within the Bass Strait between Victoria and Tasmania.
