= Mitromorpha bassiana =

Scientific classification
- Kingdom: Animalia
- Phylum: Mollusca
- Class: Gastropoda
- Subclass: Caenogastropoda
- Order: Neogastropoda
- Superfamily: Conoidea
- Family: Mitromorphidae
- Genus: Mitromorpha
- Species: M. bassiana

Binomial name
- Mitromorpha bassiana (Gabriel, 1956)

Synonyms
- Mitrithara bassiana Gabriel, 1956; Mitromorpha (Mitrolumna) bassiana (Gabriel, 1956)

Species of gastropod

Mitromorpha bassiana is a species of sea snail, a marine gastropod mollusk in the family Mitromorphidae.

== Distribution ==
This marine species is endemic to Australia and occurs in the Bass Strait
