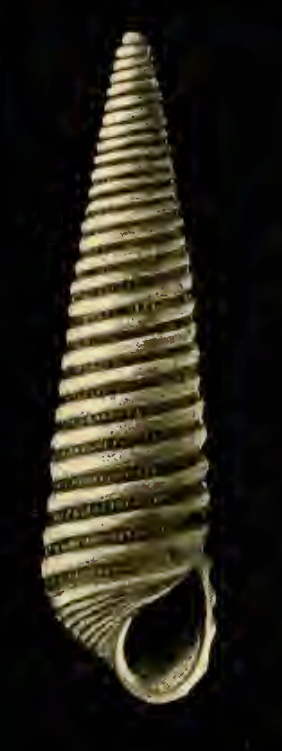
- Drawing of a shell of Cingulina cingulata

Scientific classification
- Kingdom: Animalia
- Phylum: Mollusca
- Class: Gastropoda
- Family: Pyramidellidae
- Genus: Cingulina
- Species: C. cingulata

Binomial name
- Cingulina cingulata (Dunker, 1860)

Synonyms
- Turbonilla (Cingulina) cingulata Dunker, 1860 (basionym)

= Cingulina cingulata =

Species of gastropod

Cingulina cingulata is a species of sea snail, a marine gastropod mollusk in the family Pyramidellidae, the pyrams and their allies.

== Description ==
The slender, milk-white shell has an elongate-conic shape. The length of the shell measures between 7.5 mm and 10 mm. The protoconch contains three whorls. These are large, helicoid, rather elevated, and smooth. They have their axis at a right angle to the axis of the later whorls, and are about one-fourth immersed in the first of them. The twelve, scarcely convex whorls of the teleoconch are ornamented between the sutures by three strong, moderately rounded, raised spiral keels, which are separated by channels of about the same width. The first keel is at the summit of the whorl. These raised keels are marked axially by irregular lines of growth while the depressed channels are crossed by numerous more or less equally developed and equally spaced slender axial bands. A trace of the first keel anterior to the periphery may be seen above the suture in several of the last whorls. The white interstices are striate. The periphery of the body whorl is marked by the anterior edge of the third channel. The next keel anterior to this is like those between the sutures. The remainder of the short base is marked by five less strongly developed keels and channels. The space about the umbilical region has faint, wavy spiral striations. The aperture is moderately large, and suboval. The posterior angle is obtuse, slightly effuse at the junction of the outer lip and columella. The outer lip is arcuate. The columella is short, slender, and curved, with a small and very oblique fold near its insertion which scarcely shows in the aperture. The parietal wall is covered by a thin callus.

== Habitat ==
This species is found in the following habitats:

- Brackish
- Marine

== Distribution ==
This marine species occurs off the coasts of Japan, mainly the Sea of Japan.
