= Cingulina trisulcata =

Scientific classification
- Kingdom: Animalia
- Phylum: Mollusca
- Class: Gastropoda
- Family: Pyramidellidae
- Genus: Cingulina
- Species: C. trisulcata

Binomial name
- Cingulina trisulcata Sowerby III, 1894

Species of gastropod

Cingulina trisulcata is a species of sea snail, a marine gastropod mollusk in the family Pyramidellidae, the pyrams and their allies.

== Distribution ==
This marine species occurs off Hong Kong.
