= Pseudoscilla verdensis =

Scientific classification
- Kingdom: Animalia
- Phylum: Mollusca
- Class: Gastropoda
- Family: Pyramidellidae
- Genus: Pseudoscilla
- Species: P. verdensis

Binomial name
- Pseudoscilla verdensis Peñas & Rolán, 1999

Synonyms
- Miralda tricarinata Watson, 1983

Species of gastropod

Pseudoscilla verdensis is a species of sea snail, a marine gastropod mollusk in the family Pyramidellidae, the pyrams and their allies.

== Description ==
The length of the shell varies between 1.3 mm and 2 mm.

== Distribution ==
This species occurs in the following locations:

- Atlantic Europe
- Canary Islands
- Cape Verde
- Mediterranean Sea
