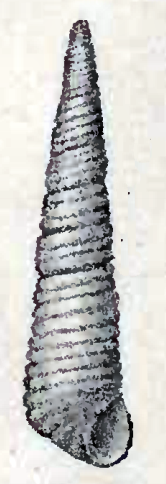
- Drawing of the apertural view of a shell of Cingulina spina

Scientific classification
- Kingdom: Animalia
- Phylum: Mollusca
- Class: Gastropoda
- Family: Pyramidellidae
- Genus: Cingulina
- Species: C. spina

Binomial name
- Cingulina spina (Crosse & Fischer, 1864)

Synonyms
- Aclis tristrictata Tenison-Woods, J.E., 1877; Turritella spina Crosse & Fischer, 1864

= Cingulina spina =

Species of gastropod

Cingulina spina is a species of sea snail, a marine gastropod mollusk in the family Pyramidellidae, the pyrams and their allies.

== Description ==
The white shell has a length of approximately 9 mm. The numerous whorls of the teleoconch are flattened, with scarcely a distinct suture. They are encircled by three spiral ribs, four on the body whorl, the lower part of which is smooth.

== Distribution ==
This species' distribution ranges from the northernmost existing specimens located within the Persian Gulf, Gulf of Oman and the Arabian Sea, to as far south as the South West Cape, Tasmania's southernmost point of land and off various coasts situated on the geographical exterior of the largest island in the world, Australia.
