= Paracingulina onzikuensis =

Scientific classification
- Kingdom: Animalia
- Phylum: Mollusca
- Class: Gastropoda
- Family: Pyramidellidae
- Genus: Paracingulina
- Species: P. onzikuensis

Binomial name
- Paracingulina onzikuensis (Nomura, 1938)

Species of gastropod

Paracingulina onzikuensis is a species of sea snail, a marine gastropod mollusk in the family Pyramidellidae, the pyrams and their allies.
