= Cingulina archimedea =

Scientific classification
- Kingdom: Animalia
- Phylum: Mollusca
- Class: Gastropoda
- Family: Pyramidellidae
- Genus: Cingulina
- Species: C. archimedea

Binomial name
- Cingulina archimedea Melvill, 1896

Species of gastropod

Cingulina archimedea is a species of sea snail, a marine gastropod mollusk in the family Pyramidellidae, the pyrams and their allies.

== Distribution ==
This marine species occurs in the Persian Gulf and in the Indian Ocean off the coasts of Mumbai.
