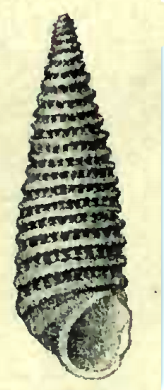
- Drawing of a shell of Cingulina isseli

Scientific classification
- Kingdom: Animalia
- Phylum: Mollusca
- Class: Gastropoda
- Family: Pyramidellidae
- Genus: Cingulina
- Species: C. isseli

Binomial name
- Cingulina isseli (Tryon, 1886)

Synonyms
- Eulimella isseli Tryon, 1886; Eulimella cingulata Issel, 1869; Turbonilla isseli Tryon, 1886

= Cingulina isseli =

Species of gastropod

Cingulina isseli is a species of sea snail, a marine gastropod mollusk in the family Pyramidellidae, the pyramids and their allies.

This species was originally described by Issel as Eulimella cingulata, a preoccupied name.

== Description ==
The length of the shell measures 3.5 mm. The white shell is a little shining, translucent, and spirally cingulated. The interstices are longitudinally striated. The teleoconch contains nine whorls, the last with 4 cingulations. The base of the shell is smooth.

== Distribution ==
This species occurs in the following locations:

- European waters (ERMS scope)
- Mersin Bay
- Madagascar
- Mediterranean Sea
- Red Sea
- Persian Gulf
