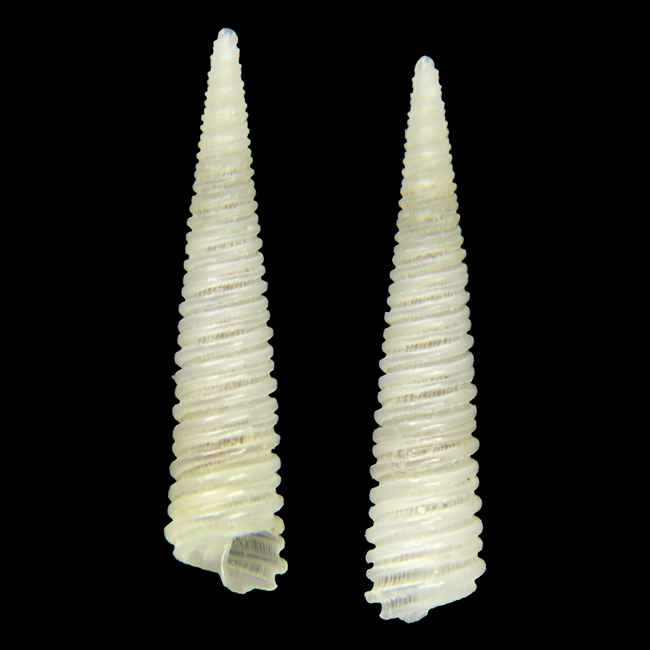

Scientific classification
- Kingdom: Animalia
- Phylum: Mollusca
- Class: Gastropoda
- Family: Pyramidellidae
- Genus: Cingulina
- Species: C. aikeni

Binomial name
- Cingulina aikeni Poppe, Tagaro & Goto, 2018

= Cingulina aikeni =

Species of gastropod

Cingulina aikeni is a species of sea snail, a marine gastropod mollusk in the family Pyramidellidae.

== Original description ==
- Poppe G.T., Tagaro S.P. & Goto Y. (2018). New marine species from the Central Philippines. Visaya. 5(1): 91–135.

page(s): 113, pl. 14 figs 1–2.
