= Pseudoscilla pauciemersa =

Scientific classification
- Kingdom: Animalia
- Phylum: Mollusca
- Class: Gastropoda
- Family: Pyramidellidae
- Genus: Pseudoscilla
- Species: P. pauciemersa

Binomial name
- Pseudoscilla pauciemersa Peñas & Rolán, 1999

Species of gastropod

Pseudoscilla pauciemersa is a species of sea snail, a marine gastropod mollusk in the family Pyramidellidae, the pyrams and their allies.

== Distribution ==
This species occurs in the Canary Islands and the coasts of Mauritania and Senegal.
