= Polyspirella pellucida =

Scientific classification
- Kingdom: Animalia
- Phylum: Mollusca
- Class: Gastropoda
- Family: Pyramidellidae
- Genus: Polyspirella
- Species: P. pellucida

Binomial name
- Polyspirella pellucida (G.B. Sowerby III, 1897)

Synonyms
- Cioniscus pellucidus G.B. Sowerby III, 1897 (basionym); Turbonilla pellucida (G.B. Sowerby III, 1897); Turbonilla pellucida affinis W.H. Turton, 1932

Species of gastropod

Polyspirella pellucida is a species of sea snail, a marine gastropod mollusk in the family Pyramidellidae, the pyrams and their allies.

== Distribution ==
The type species was found off Port Alfred, South Africa.
