= Cingulina imperita =

Scientific classification
- Kingdom: Animalia
- Phylum: Mollusca
- Class: Gastropoda
- Family: Pyramidellidae
- Genus: Cingulina
- Species: C. imperita

Binomial name
- Cingulina imperita Laseron, 1959

Species of gastropod

Cingulina imperita is a species of sea snail, a marine gastropod mollusk in the family Pyramidellidae, the pyrams and their allies.

== Distribution ==
This marine species occurs off the eastern coasts of Queensland, one of 5 states and 2 territories of the Australian continent.
