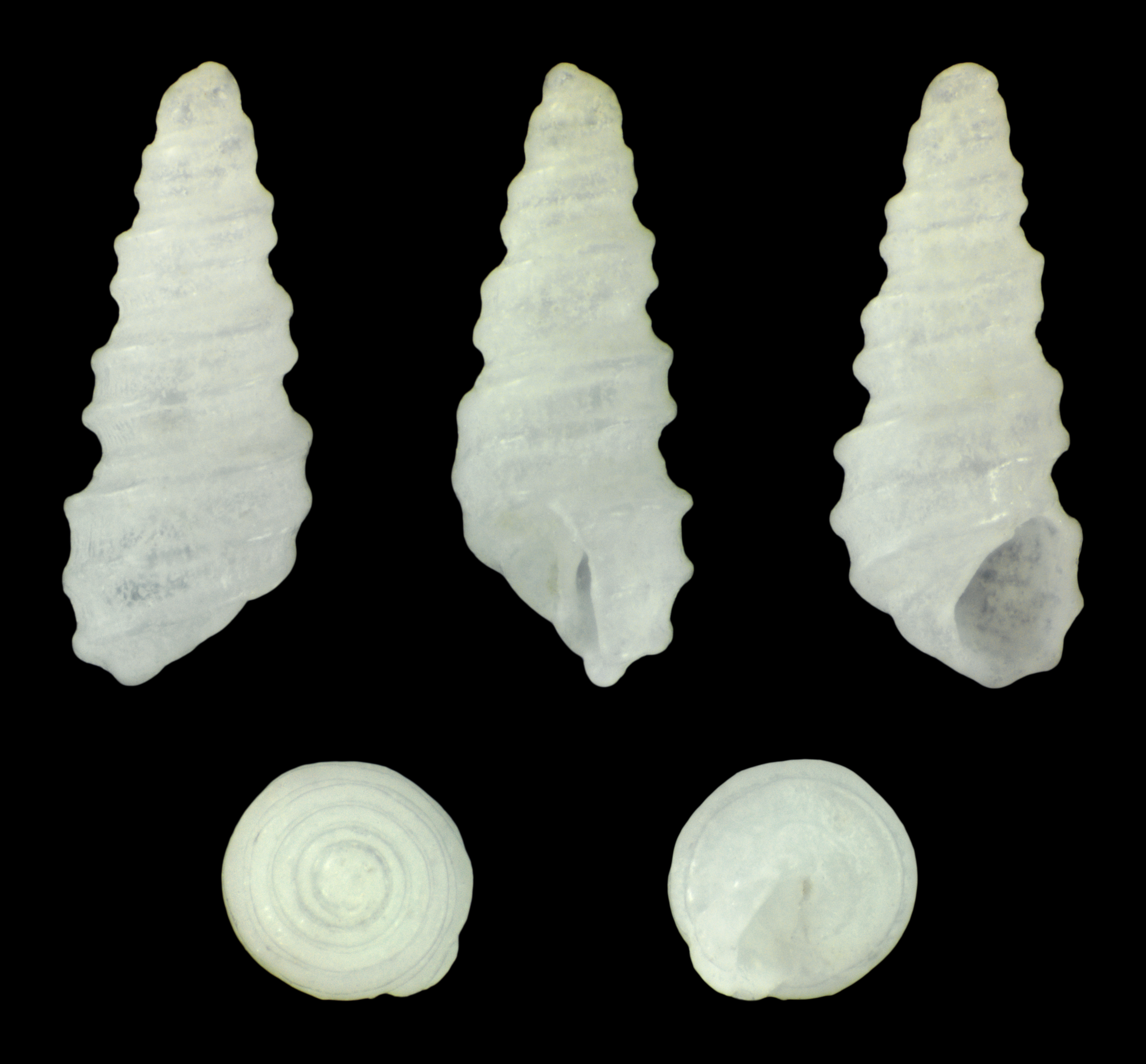

Scientific classification
- Kingdom: Animalia
- Phylum: Mollusca
- Class: Gastropoda
- Family: Pyramidellidae
- Genus: Pseudoscilla
- Species: P. bilirata

Binomial name
- Pseudoscilla bilirata (de Folin, 1870)

Synonyms
- Aclis tricarinata Watson, 1897; Jaminea bilirata de Folin, 1870 (basionym)

= Pseudoscilla bilirata =

Species of gastropod

Pseudoscilla bilirata is a species of sea snail, a marine gastropod mollusk in the family Pyramidellidae, the pyrams and their allies.

== Description ==
The length of the shell varies between 1.5 mm and 2 mm. Like most Pyramidellidae, the shell is white. Protruding dextral ridges spiral up the shell's opening to the tip. The opening lip of the shell is ridged.

(Description of Aclis tricarinata) The shell is strong, rather stumpy, semitransparent, and somewhat glossy.

Sculpture: excessively strong spiral keels project from each whorl, from below the embryonic whorl two of these appear on each succeeding whorl, weaker than these a third one lies just above the suture and runs out on the body whorl at the corner of the aperture nearly as strong as the other two. On the base a similar but weaker keel encircles the columella. These keels are parted by a flat shallow furrow, which is rather over 0.001 inch in width, and which is scored across by pretty close-set distinct but not strong round-topped longitudinal threads, which again are scored by microscopic spiral striae. These striae, but hardly the longitudinal threads, are visible on the top of the spiral keels.

The colour of the shell is white, glossy, but hardly brilliant.

The spire is high and narrow, with a blunt, globular, regular, one-sided, hyaline, glossy tip, consisting of one whorl on which some very faint longitudinal striae are doubtfully traceable. The shell contains six whorls, with a contour very much angulated by the spiral keels and the broad sunken suture. The suture is wide, deep, and rather oblique. The aperture is obovate and rather large. The outer lip has a sweep which in itself is regular but is much disturbed, especially on the base, by the spiral keels and furrows. These give the thin lip-edge an unfinished appearance. The inner lip is somewhat irregular, from the forward tip to the umbilicus it is patulous and slightly curved. Where it strikes the base the curve is obtusely and roundly angulated. Across the body the lip runs in an oblique straight line with a projecting strong edge till past the umbilicus, when it lies close back on the body and though thinner continues till it joins the outer lip. The umbilicus is a deep narrow chink.

== Distribution ==
This marine species occurs on the Atlantic coast of Africa, from Morocco in the north to Angola in the south. It also occurs on the Canary Islands, Madeira and the Savage Islands, but it does not occur in Cape Verde and São Tomé and Príncipe.
