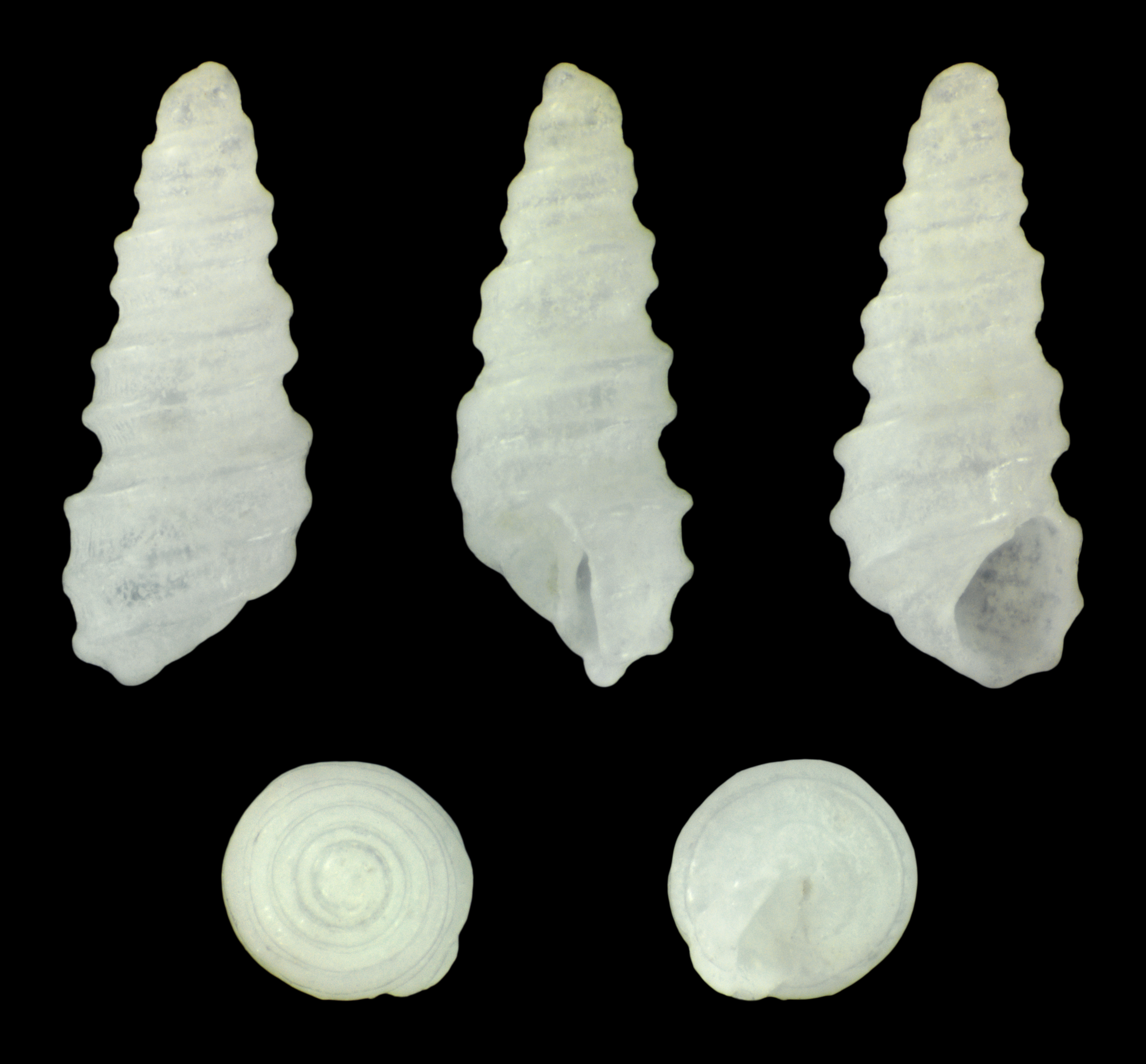
- Apertural view of Pseudoscilla babylonia

Scientific classification
- Kingdom: Animalia
- Phylum: Mollusca
- Class: Gastropoda
- Subcohort: Panpulmonata
- Superfamily: Pyramidelloidea
- Family: Pyramidellidae
- Genus: Pseudoscilla; Boettger, 1901

Type species
- Oscilla (Pseudoscilla) miocaenica Böttger, O., 1901

Synonyms
- Jaminea de Folin, 1870; Miraldiella Cossmann, 1921

= Pseudoscilla =

Genus of gastropods

Pseudoscilla is a genus of sea snails, marine gastropod mollusks in the family Pyramidellidae, the pyrams and their allies.

== Species ==
Species within the genus Pseudoscilla include:

- Pseudoscilla babylonia (C. B. Adams, 1845)
- Pseudoscilla bilirata (de Folin, 1870)
- Pseudoscilla pauciemersa Peñas & Rolán, 1999
- Pseudoscilla saotomensis Penas & Rolan, 1999
- Pseudoscilla verdensis Peñas & Rolán, 1999

Species placed in synonymy

- Pseudoscilla decorata (Folin, 1873): synonym of Liamorpha decorata (de Folin, 1873)
