= Cingulina truncata =

Scientific classification
- Kingdom: Animalia
- Phylum: Mollusca
- Class: Gastropoda
- Family: Pyramidellidae
- Genus: Cingulina
- Species: C. truncata

Binomial name
- Cingulina truncata Saurin, 1959

Species of gastropod

Cingulina truncata is a species of sea snail, a marine gastropod mollusk in the family Pyramidellidae, the pyrams and their allies.

== Distribution ==
This marine species occurs off the coasts of Vietnam.
