= Cingulina circinata =

Scientific classification
- Kingdom: Animalia
- Phylum: Mollusca
- Class: Gastropoda
- Family: Pyramidellidae
- Genus: Cingulina
- Species: C. circinata

Binomial name
- Cingulina circinata A. Adams, 1860

Synonyms
- Cingulina circumdata Gould, A.A., 1861

Species of gastropod

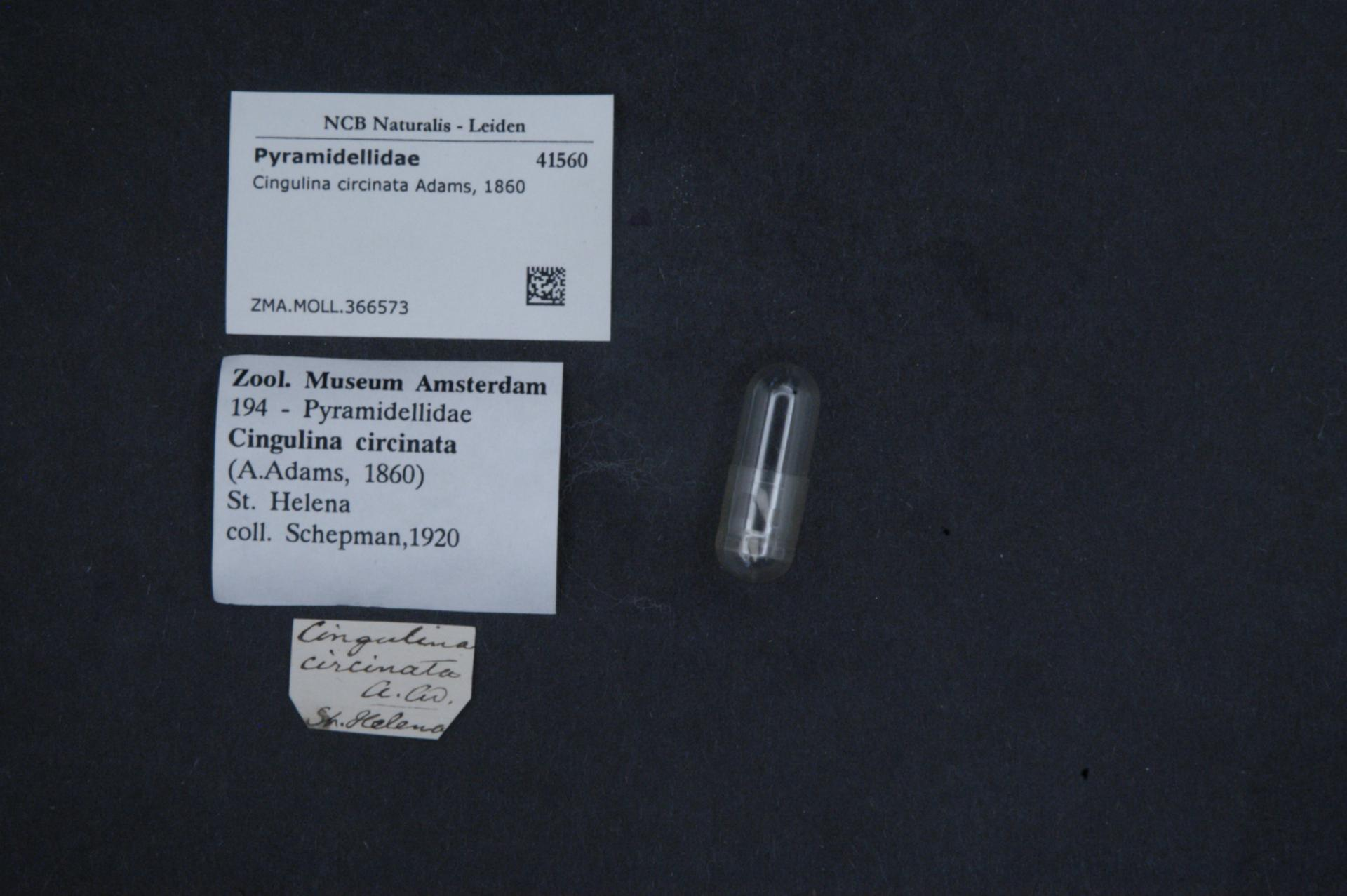
Cingulina circinata Adams

Cingulina circinata is a species of sea snail, a marine gastropod mollusk in the family Pyramidellidae, the pyrams and their allies.

== Distribution ==
This marine species occurs off the coasts of Southeast Asia, waters surrounding Japan, mainly the Sea of Japan and Australian waters, such as the Bass Strait, Timor Sea and the Perth Basin.
