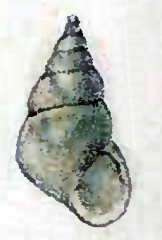
- Drawing of a shell of Cingulina brazieri

Scientific classification
- Kingdom: Animalia
- Phylum: Mollusca
- Class: Gastropoda
- Family: Pyramidellidae
- Genus: Cingulina
- Species: C. brazieri

Binomial name
- Cingulina brazieri Angas, 1877

Synonyms
- Eulimella tricincta Tate, 1898; Terebra hedleyi Tate, 1901; Stylifer brazieri Angas, 1877

= Cingulina brazieri =

Species of gastropod

Cingulina brazieri is a species of sea snail, a marine gastropod mollusk in the family Pyramidellidae, the pyrams and their allies.

== Description ==
The white shell is smooth, pellucid, and polished. Its length measures 4 mm. The teleoconch contains six whorls that are flattened just below the suture, which is finely, callously margined. The apex is styliform.

== Distribution ==
This marine species occurs off the coasts of New South Wales, Australia, mainly throughout deep areas east of the Sydney Harbour.
