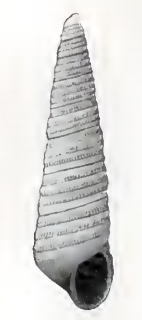
- Apertural view of a shell of Polyspirella aglaia

Scientific classification
- Kingdom: Animalia
- Phylum: Mollusca
- Class: Gastropoda
- Family: Pyramidellidae
- Tribe: Cingulinini
- Genus: Polyspirella; Carpenter, 1861

= Polyspirella =

Genus of gastropods

Polyspirella is a genus of sea snails, marine gastropod mollusks in the family Pyramidellidae, the pyrams and their allies.

== Species ==
Species within the genus Polyspirella include:

- Polyspirella aglaia (Bartsch, 1915)
- Polyspirella callista (Bartsch, 1915)
- Polyspirella pellucida (G.B. Sowerby III, 1897)
- Polyspirella trachealis (Gould, 1861)
