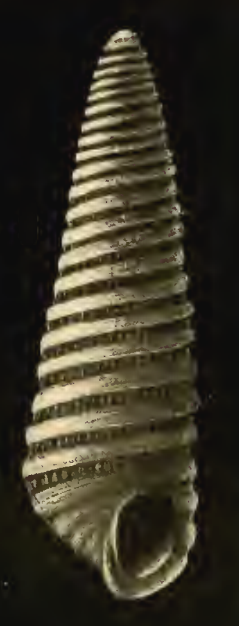
- Drawing of a shell of Cingulina laticingula

Scientific classification
- Kingdom: Animalia
- Phylum: Mollusca
- Class: Gastropoda
- Family: Pyramidellidae
- Genus: Cingulina
- Species: C. laticingula

Binomial name
- Cingulina laticingula (Dall, W.H. & P. Bartsch, 1906)

Synonyms
- Cingulina laticingulata [sic] (misspelling); Turbonilla (Cingulina) cingulata laticingula Dall, W.H. & P. Bartsch, 1906

= Cingulina laticingula =

Species of gastropod

Cingulina laticingula is a species of sea snail, a marine gastropod mollusk in the family Pyramidellidae, the pyrams and their allies.

== Description ==
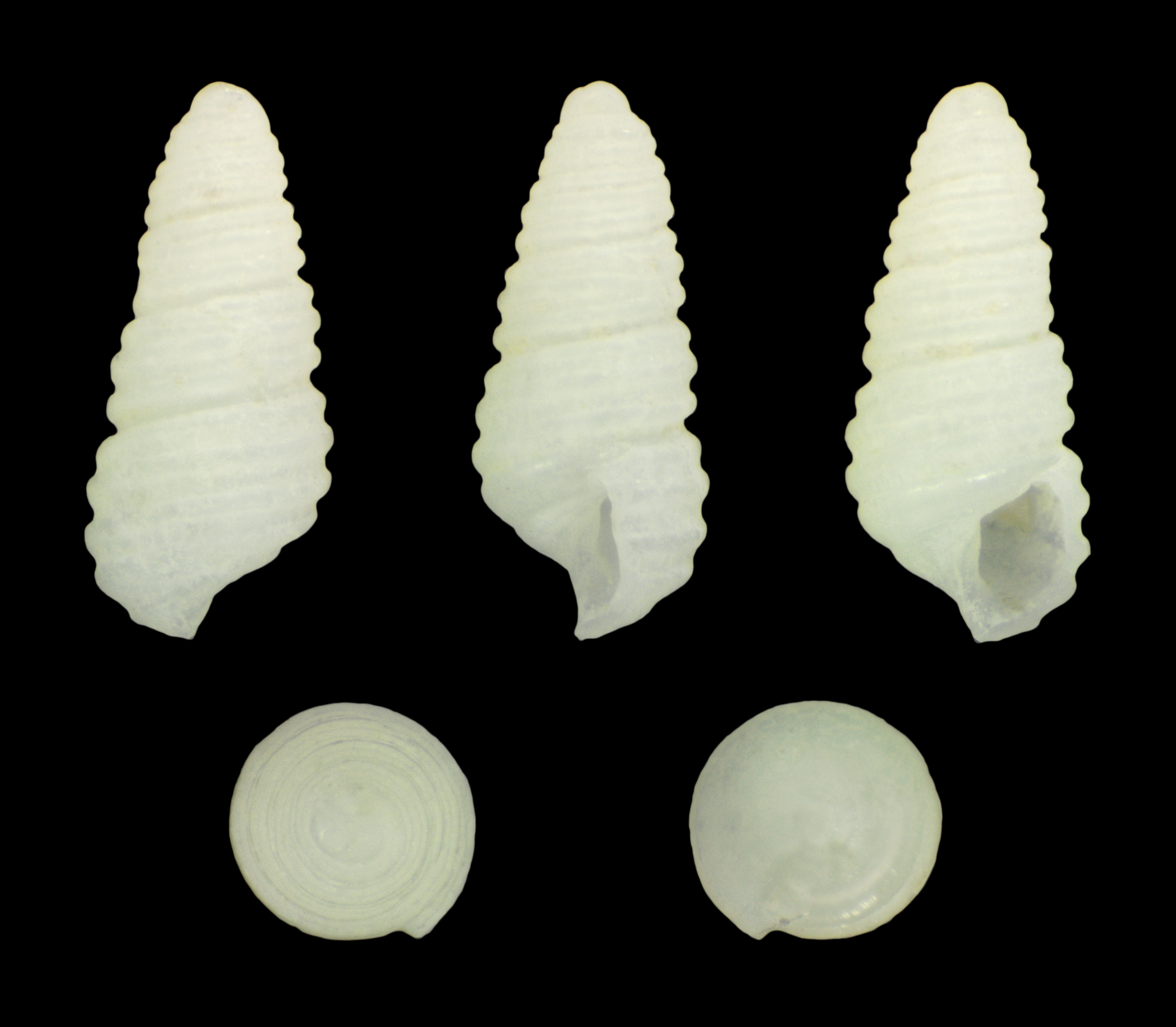
Juvenile

The length of the shell varies between 2.6 mm and 4 mm. The whorls of the protoconch are about one-third buried. The teleoconch contains nine whorls. The small axial bars are a little more pronounced and only four basal keels are present, the first one anterior to the periphery being extremely wide, fully double the width of the next. The aperture also is a little more effuse at the junction of the outer lip and the columella.

== Distribution ==
This marine species occurs off the Philippines and Japan.
