= Cingulina secernenda =

Scientific classification
- Kingdom: Animalia
- Phylum: Mollusca
- Class: Gastropoda
- Family: Pyramidellidae
- Genus: Cingulina
- Species: C. secernenda

Binomial name
- Cingulina secernenda Melvill, 1918

Species of gastropod

Cingulina secernenda is a species of sea snail, a marine gastropod mollusk in the family Pyramidellidae, the pyrams and their allies.

== Distribution ==
This species occurs in the northern portion of the Indian Ocean off the coasts of Pakistan, Asia.
