= Pseudoscilla saotomensis =

Scientific classification
- Kingdom: Animalia
- Phylum: Mollusca
- Class: Gastropoda
- Family: Pyramidellidae
- Genus: Pseudoscilla
- Species: P. saotomensis

Binomial name
- Pseudoscilla saotomensis Peñas & Rolán, 1999

Species of gastropod

Pseudoscilla saotomensis is a species of sea snail, a marine gastropod mollusk in the family Pyramidellidae, the pyrams and their allies.

== Distribution ==
This marine species only occurs in the Atlantic Ocean off São Tomé and Príncipe.
