= Paracingulina =

Scientific classification
- Kingdom: Animalia
- Phylum: Mollusca
- Class: Gastropoda
- Family: Pyramidellidae
- Tribe: Cingulinini
- Genus: Paracingulina; Nomura, 1936

Genus of gastropods

Paracingulina is a genus of sea snails, marine gastropod mollusks in the family Pyramidellidae, the pyrams and their allies.

== Species ==
Species within the genus Paracingulina include:

- Paracingulina inequicingulata (Nomura, 1938)
- Paracingulina onzikuensis (Nomura, 1938)
- Paracingulina quatericingulata (Nomura, 1938)
- Paracingulina terebra (Dunker, 1860)
- Paracingulina triarata (Pilsbry, 1904)
