= Cingulina bellardii =

Scientific classification
- Kingdom: Animalia
- Phylum: Mollusca
- Class: Gastropoda
- Family: Pyramidellidae
- Genus: Cingulina
- Species: C. bellardii

Binomial name
- Cingulina bellardii Hornung & Mermod, 1924

Species of gastropod

Cingulina bellardii is a species of sea snail, a marine gastropod mollusk in the family Pyramidellidae, the pyrams and their allies.

== Distribution ==
This species occurs throughout various underwater geographical formations situated within the Red Sea. (22°N 38°E)
