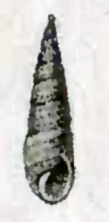
- Drawing of a shell of Paracingulina terebra

Scientific classification
- Kingdom: Animalia
- Phylum: Mollusca
- Class: Gastropoda
- Family: Pyramidellidae
- Genus: Paracingulina
- Species: P. terebra

Binomial name
- Paracingulina terebra (Dunker, 1860)

Synonyms
- Cingulina terebra (Dunker, 1860); Turbinella terebra Dunker, 1860 (basionym)

= Paracingulina terebra =

Species of gastropod

Paracingulina terebra is a species of sea snail, a marine gastropod mollusk in the family Pyramidellidae, the pyrams and their allies.

== Description ==
The white, shining shell measures approximately 8 mm. The twelve whorls of the teleoconch are scarcely convex. The whorls of the spire show three revolving ribs. The body whorl has eight ribs, the lower ones smaller.

== Distribution ==
This species occurs in the Indo-Pacific Oceans and off the coasts of Japan in the Sea of Japan.
