= Paracingulina triarata =

Scientific classification
- Kingdom: Animalia
- Phylum: Mollusca
- Class: Gastropoda
- Family: Pyramidellidae
- Genus: Paracingulina
- Species: P. triarata

Binomial name
- Paracingulina triarata (Pilsbry, 1904)

Synonyms
- Cingulina biarata Nomura, 1937; Cingulina triarata Pilsbry, 1904

Species of gastropod

Paracingulina triarata is a species of sea snail, a marine gastropod mollusk in the family Pyramidellidae, the pyrams and their allies.

== Distribution ==
This species occurs in the Pacific Ocean off Japan.
