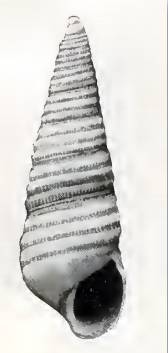
- Drawing of a shell of Polyspirella trachealis

Scientific classification
- Kingdom: Animalia
- Phylum: Mollusca
- Class: Gastropoda
- Family: Pyramidellidae
- Genus: Polyspirella
- Species: P. trachealis

Binomial name
- Polyspirella trachealis (Gould, 1861)

Synonyms
- Chemnitzia (Polyspirella) trachealis Gould, 1861 (basionym); Chemnitzia trachealis Gould, 1861; Cingulina trachealis (Gould, 1861); Turbonilla (Cingulina) trachealis (Gould, 1861)

= Polyspirella trachealis =

Species of gastropod

Polyspirella trachealis is a species of sea snail, a marine gastropod mollusk in the family Pyramidellidae, the pyrams and their allies.

== Description ==
The yellowish-white shell has an elongate-conic shape. Its length varies between 5.7 mm and 12.2 mm. The whorls of the protoconch are large, planorboid, smooth and well rounded. They are obliquely immersed in the first of the succeeding turns, above which only the tilted edge of the last two volutions projects. The twelve whorls of the teleoconch are moderately rounded. They are shouldered at the summit, and marked by three strong spiral cords which slope abruptly posteriorly and gently anteriorly. These cords are about twice as wide as the spaces that separate them. Beginning with the third to last turn, the suture falls gradually more and more anterior to the periphery, exposing a portion of the base, which appears as a flattened band above the suture. In addition to the spiral cords, the whorls are marked by numerous, slender, raised, axial threads in the depressed spaces between the cords. These threads are about one-fourth as wide as the spaces that separate them. The suture is scarcely differentiated from the other grooves. The periphery of the body whorl is well rounded. The base of the shell is rather short, and well rounded. It is marked by incremental lines and exceedingly fine, spiral striations. The aperture is broadly ovate. The posterior angle is acute. The outer lip is thin, showing the external sculpture within. The columella is somewhat twisted. It is provided with an obsolete fold at its insertion.

== Distribution ==
The type specimen was found off Cape of Good Hope, South Africa.
