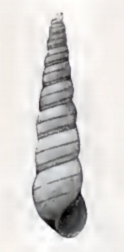
- Drawing of a shell of Polyspirella callista

Scientific classification
- Kingdom: Animalia
- Phylum: Mollusca
- Class: Gastropoda
- Family: Pyramidellidae
- Genus: Polyspirella
- Species: P. callista

Binomial name
- Polyspirella callista (Bartsch, 1915)

Synonyms
- Cingulina callista (Bartsch, 1915); Turbonilla callista Bartsch, 1915; Turbonilla (Cingulina) callista Bartsch, 1915 (basionym)

= Polyspirella callista =

Species of gastropod

Polyspirella callista is a species of sea snail, a marine gastropod mollusk in the family Pyramidellidae, the pyrams and their allies.

== Description ==
The white shell is very slender and has an elongate-conic shape. The length measures 4.2 mm. There are at least two, small whorls in the protoconch. They are depressed helicoid, and obliquely one-third immersed in the first of the succeeding turns. The nine whorls of the teleoconch are well rounded. They are marked between the sutures by three very strong, incised, spiral grooves, of which one is immediately below the summit, the second on the middle of the whorls, and the third about as far posterior to the suture as the first is anterior to the summit. The axial sculpture consists of vertical incremental lines only. The periphery and the base of the body whorl are well rounded, marked by incremental lines only. The aperture is oval. The posterior angle is acute. The outer lip is thin, showing the external sculpture within. The inner lip is very slender, decidedly curved and reflected; free only at the extreme anterior portion, the rest appressed. The parietal wall is glazed with a thin callus.

== Distribution ==
The type specimen was found off Port Alfred, South Africa.
