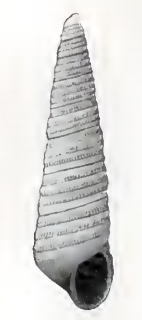
- Drawing of a shell of Polyspirella aglaia

Scientific classification
- Kingdom: Animalia
- Phylum: Mollusca
- Class: Gastropoda
- Family: Pyramidellidae
- Genus: Polyspirella
- Species: P. aglaia

Binomial name
- Polyspirella aglaia (Bartsch, 1915)

Synonyms
- Cingulina aglaia (Bartsch, 1915); Turbonilla aglaia Bartsch, 1915; Turbonilla (Cingulina) aglaia Bartsch, 1915 (basionym)

= Polyspirella aglaia =

Species of gastropod

Polyspirella aglaia is a species of sea snail, a marine gastropod mollusk in the family Pyramidellidae, the pyrams and their allies.

== Description ==
The subdiaphanous, bluish-white shell has an elongate-conic shape. The length of the shell measures 5.3 mm. There are at least two whorls in the protoconch. They are small, depressed helicoid, and obliquely one-third immersed in the first of the succeeding turns. The 8½ whorls of the teleoconch are moderately rounded. They are marked by three strong spiral longitudinal grooves (striations) between the sutures on the early whorls, while on the later ones the peripheral cord becomes completely exposed in the suture, giving these whorls four spiral cords. These spiral cords are truncated posteriorly and slope gently anteriorly. They are a little wider than the grooves that separate them. The grooves are crossed by numerous, very slender, somewhat protractive axial riblets. The sutures are scarcely differentiated from the spiral grooves. The periphery of the body whorl is bounded posteriorly by a spiral groove. Anteriorly there is no limiting groove to denote the peripheral cord, which is apparent in the suture on the preceding turns, where the periphery passes evenly into a short, well-rounded base, which is marked by exceedingly fine, spiral striations and lines of growth. The aperture is subquadrate. The posterior angle is obtuse. The outer lip is thin, showing the external sculpture within, rendered wavy at the edge by the external sculpture. The inner lip is decidedly curved and slightly reflected. It is provided with a weak fold at its insertion. The parietal wall is glazed with a thin callus.

== Distribution ==
The type specimen was found off Port Alfred, South Africa.
