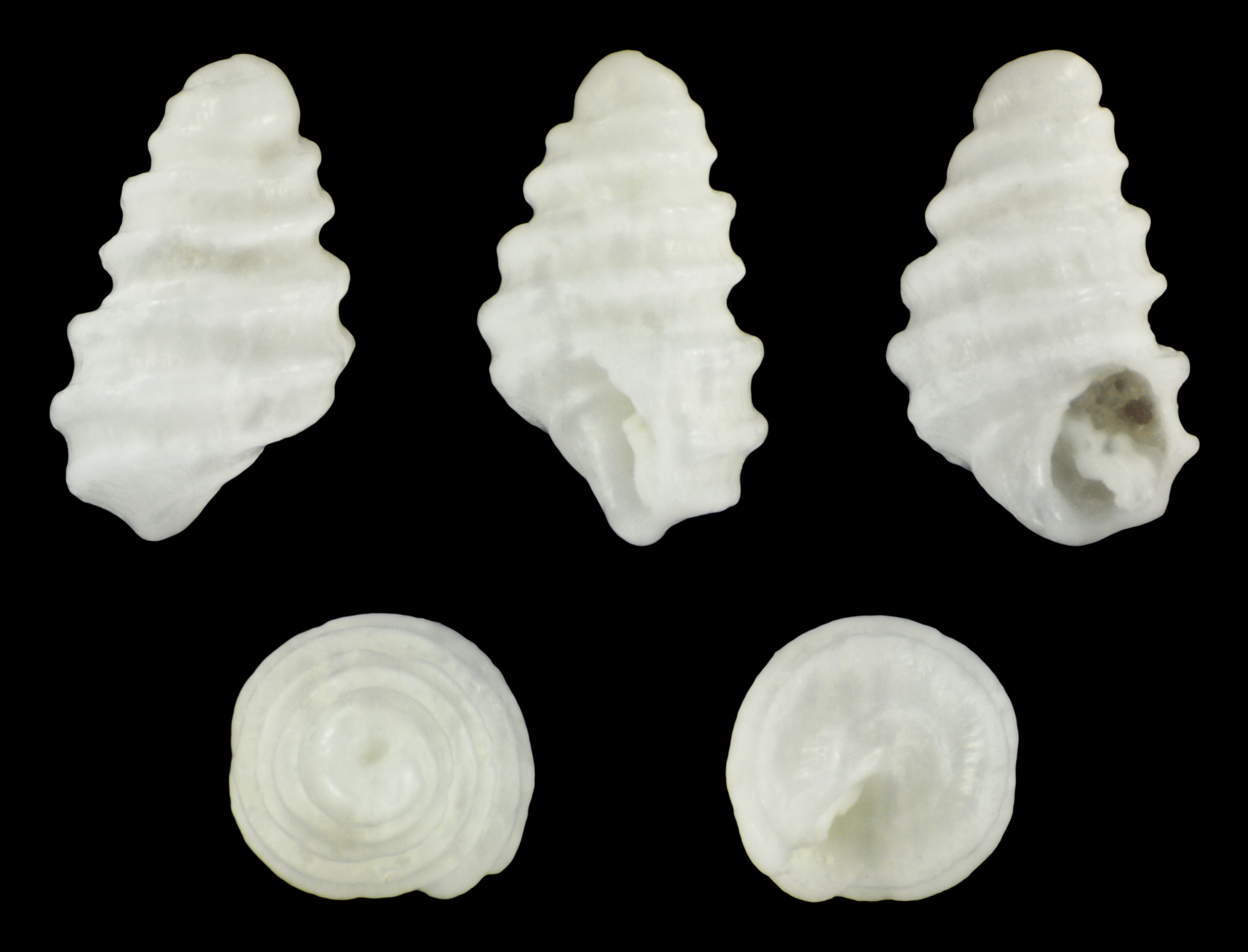

Scientific classification
- Kingdom: Animalia
- Phylum: Mollusca
- Class: Gastropoda
- Family: Pyramidellidae
- Genus: Pseudoscilla
- Species: P. babylonia

Binomial name
- Pseudoscilla babylonia (C. B. Adams, 1845)

Synonyms
- Aclis tricarinata Watson, R.B., 1897; Cingulina babylonia (C. B. Adams, 1845); Miralda judithae Nowell-Usticke, G.W., 1959; Odostomia babylonia (C. B. Adams, 1845); Odostomia (Scalenostoma) babylonia C.B. Adams, 1845 (basionym)

= Pseudoscilla babylonia =

Species of gastropod

Pseudoscilla babylonia, common name the Babylon pyram, is a species of small sea snail, a marine gastropod mollusk in the family Pyramidellidae, the pyrams and their allies.
