= Turbonilla urdeneta =

Scientific classification
- Kingdom: Animalia
- Phylum: Mollusca
- Class: Gastropoda
- Family: Pyramidellidae
- Genus: Turbonilla
- Species: T. urdeneta

Binomial name
- Turbonilla urdeneta Bartsch, 1917

Synonyms
- Cingulina urdeneta (Bartsch, 1917)

Species of gastropod

Turbonilla urdeneta is a species of sea snail, a marine gastropod mollusk in the family Pyramidellidae, the pyrams and their allies.
