= Charles John Gabriel =

Australian pharmacist and amateur conchologist

Charles John Gabriel (28 May 1879 – 19 June 1963) was an Australian pharmacist and amateur conchologist. He wrote circa 50 scientific papers and articles. He also co-authored the book, Marine Molluscs of Victoria.

== Life ==
Gabriel was born in Collingwood, Melbourne. He was registered as a pharmacist in 1902. In 1910 he married Laura Violet Marian Vale, with whom he had two sons. He was interested in conchology from an early age, an interest instigated and fostered by his father, who was an honorary collector for the National Museum of Victoria. Gabriel joined the Field Naturalists Club of Victoria in 1900.

Gabriel undertook a long-term collaboration with John Gatliff on updating the latter's Catalogue of the Marine Shells of Victoria. He was the first local conchologist to make a serious study of the land and freshwater molluscs of the state, in the course of which he described 23 new non-marine taxa. He died at his home in Toorak in 1963. His library and shell collection were bequeathed to the National Museum of Victoria.

== Honours and awards ==
- Honorary Associate in Conchology, National Museum of Victoria
- Australian Natural History Medallion (1958)

== Publications ==
As well as producing some 50 scientific papers and articles, Gabriel co-authored the definitive:

- Macpherson, J. Hope; & Gabriel, C.J. (1962). Marine Molluscs of Victoria. Melbourne University Press in association with The National Museum of Victoria.
