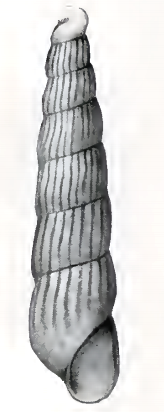
- Drawing of a shell of Pyrgiscus thielei

Scientific classification
- Kingdom: Animalia
- Phylum: Mollusca
- Class: Gastropoda
- Superfamily: Pyramidelloidea
- Family: Pyramidellidae
- Subfamily: Turbonillinae
- Genus: Pyrgiscus; Philippi, 1841

Type species
- Melania rufa Philippi, 1836

Synonyms
- Ortostelis Aradas & Maggiore, 1841 (objective synonym); Pyrgiscilla Laws, 1937; Pyrgisculus Monterosato, 1884; Pyrgiscus (Pyrgiscus) Philippi, 1841; Pyrgostelis Monterosato, 1884; Turbonilla (Pyrgisculus) Monterosato, 1884; Turbonilla (Pyrgiscus) Philippi, 1841; Turbonilla (Pyrgostelis) Monterosato, 1884

= Pyrgiscus =

Genus of gastropods

Pyrgiscus is a genus of sea snails, marine gastropod mollusks in the subfamily Turbonillinae of the family Pyramidellidae, the pyrams and their allies.

== Species ==
Species within the genus Pyrgiscus include:

- † Pyrgiscus abjunctus Laws, 1937
- Pyrgiscus abrardi (Fischer-Piette & Nicklès, 1946)
- † Pyrgiscus adeps (Laws, 1937)
- Pyrgiscus alacer Saurin, 1959
- Pyrgiscus altenai van Aartsen & Corgan, 1996
- Pyrgiscus amicitia (Nomura, 1936)
- Pyrgiscus asmundinus (Saurin, 1959)
- Pyrgiscus aureocinctus (Kuroda & Habe, 1971)
- Pyrgiscus basicinctus (Saurin, 1959)
- Pyrgiscus bisculptus (Nomura, 1937)
- Pyrgiscus bona (Nomura, 1937)
- Pyrgiscus boninensis (Nomura, 1939)
- Pyrgiscus brevis (Nomura, 1936)
- † Pyrgiscus caribbaeus Landau & LaFollette, 2015
- Pyrgiscus cedrosus (Dall, 1884)
- † Pyrgiscus chattonensis (Marwick, 1929)
- Pyrgiscus crassus Saurin, 1959
- Pyrgiscus crenatus (Brown, 1827)
- Pyrgiscus crystallopectus (Melvill, 1910)
- Pyrgiscus dawydoffi (Saurin, 1959)
- Pyrgiscus dongkhanhi (Saurin, 1959)
- Pyrgiscus eminutus (de Folin, 1878)
- Pyrgiscus erica (Thiele, 1925)
- Pyrgiscus eumenes (Melvill, 1910)
- Pyrgiscus feraudi (Saurin, 1959)
- † Pyrgiscus festivus (Marwick, 1943)
- Pyrgiscus gracilentus (Nomura, 1936)
- † Pyrgiscus hampdenensis (R. S. Allan, 1926)
- Pyrgiscus hataianus (Nomura, 1937)
- Pyrgiscus hebridarum (Peñas & Rolán, 2010)
- Pyrgiscus inaequistriatus (Saurin, 1959)
- Pyrgiscus infantilis Saurin, 1958
- Pyrgiscus infelix (Thiele, 1925)
- † Pyrgiscus intextus (Marwick, 1931)
- Pyrgiscus irma (Thiele, 1925)
- Pyrgiscus jeffreysii (Jeffreys, 1848)
- Pyrgiscus kotorai (Nomura, 1936)
- Pyrgiscus mabutii (Nomura, 1938)
- † Pyrgiscus macphersoni (Marwick, 1931)
- Pyrgiscus massui (Saurin, 1959)
- Pyrgiscus matsunamiensis (Otuka, 1935)
- Pyrgiscus miyakoensis (Nomura, 1939)
- Pyrgiscus mourazimanus (Nomura, 1938)
- Pyrgiscus nagarinus Saurin, 1959
- Pyrgiscus ninettae van Aartsen & Corgan, 1996
- Pyrgiscus optimus (Nomura, 1936)
- Pyrgiscus optivus (Nomura, 1937)
- Pyrgiscus otakauicus (Laws, 1937)
- † Pyrgiscus otoconsors (Laws, 1937)
- Pyrgiscus pacificus (Yokoyama, 1922)
- Pyrgiscus pellucidus (Saurin, 1959)
- Pyrgiscus plebeia (Nomura, 1936)
- Pyrgiscus prolongatus (W.H. Turton, 1932)
- Pyrgiscus quangae Saurin, 1959
- Pyrgiscus renatae (Saurin, 1959)
- Pyrgiscus rufescens (Forbes, 1846)
- Pyrgiscus rufus (Philippi, 1836)
- Pyrgiscus semistriata (Saurin, 1962)
- Pyrgiscus siamensis (Saurin, 1962)
- † Pyrgiscus silvai Landau & LaFollette, 2015
- Pyrgiscus speciosus (A. Adams, 1860)
- Pyrgiscus tabulae (Saurin, 1962)
- Pyrgiscus taiaroa (Laws, 1937)
- Pyrgiscus tateyamaensis (Nomura, 1938)
- Pyrgiscus tefunta (Bartsch, 1915)
- Pyrgiscus thielei van Aartsen & Corgan, 1996
- Pyrgiscus thuanae (Saurin, 1959)
- Pyrgiscus umemotoi (Nomura, 1938)
- Pyrgiscus vannieri Saurin, 1959
- † Pyrgiscus waihaoicus (P. A. Maxwell, 1992)
- Pyrgiscus yoritomoi (Nomura, 1938)
- Pyrgiscus yoshikoae Hori & Fukuda, 1999
- Pyrgiscus yoshisadai (Nomura, 1938)
- Pyrgiscus yotukurensis (Nomura, 1938)
- Pyrgiscus yvonnae (Saurin, 1959)
- Pyrgiscus zinboi (Nomura, 1936)

The following species were brought into synonymy

- Pyrgiscus aulicus (Dall & Bartsch, 1906): synonym of Turbonilla aulica Dall & Bartsch, 1906
- Pyrgiscus bisculpta [sic]: synonym of Pyrgiscus bisculptus (Nomura, 1937)
- Pyrgiscus bowensis [sic]: synonym of Turbonilla bowenensis Laseron, 1959
- † Pyrgiscus discors P. A. Maxwell, 1988 : synonym of † Turriscala discors (P. A. Maxwell, 1988)
- Pyrgiscus erna (Thiele, 1925): synonym of Pyrgiscus thielei van Aartsen & Corgan, 1996 (Invalid: based on junior homonym of Turbonilla erna Bartsch, 1915; Pyrgiscus thielei is a replacement name)
- Pyrgiscus flexicosta Laseron, 1951: synonym of Turbonilla flexicosta (Laseron, 1951)
- Pyrgiscus fulvizonatus (Melvill, 1910): synonym of Turbonilla fulvizonata Nomura, 1938
- Pyrgiscus gravicosta Laseron, 1951: synonym of Turbonilla gravicosta (Laseron, 1951)
- Pyrgiscus hataiana [sic]: synonym of Pyrgiscus hataianus (Nomura, 1937)
- Pyrgiscus hedleyi Laseron, 1951: synonym of Turbonilla hedleyi (Laseron, 1951)
- Pyrgiscus infans Laseron, 1951: synonym of Graphis infans (Laseron, 1951) (original combination)
- Pyrgiscus microscopica (Laseron, 1959): synonym of Turbonilla mumia (A. Adams, 1861)
- Pyrgiscus mirandus Saurin, 1959: synonym of Turbonilla funiculata de Folin, 1868
- Pyrgiscus mumia (A. Adams, 1861): synonym of Turbonilla mumia (A. Adams, 1861)
- Pyrgiscus optima [sic]: synonym of Pyrgiscus optimus (Nomura, 1936)
- Pyrgiscus pacifica [sic]: synonym of Pyrgiscus pacificus (Yokoyama, 1922)
- Pyrgiscus pinguis Laseron, 1951: synonym of Turbonilla pinguis (Laseron, 1951)
- Pyrgiscus sumneri (Bartsch, 1909): synonym of Turbonilla sumneri Bartsch, 1909
