= M. rex =

M. rex may refer to:

- Megalopanax rex, a flowering plant species endemic to Cuba
- Melanocharacidium rex, a species of South American darter
- Meriones rex, the king jird, a rodent species found in Saudi Arabia and Yemen
- Mormula rex, a species of sea snail
- Mylomys rex, the Ethiopian mylomys, a rodent species found only in Ethiopia
- Myodes rex, the Hokkaido red-backed vole, a rodent species found only in Japan
- M. Rex, a comic book series that inspired Generator Rex.

== See also ==
- Rex (disambiguation)
