= Mormula =

Scientific classification
- Kingdom: Animalia
- Phylum: Mollusca
- Class: Gastropoda
- Subcohort: Panpulmonata
- Superfamily: Pyramidelloidea
- Family: Pyramidellidae
- Genus: Mormula; A. Adams, 1863

Type species
- Mormula rissoina A. Adams, 1864

Genus of gastropods

Mormula is a genus of sea snails, marine gastropod mollusks in the family Pyramidellidae, the pyrams and their allies.

== Description ==
The thick shell is turreted and shaped like an awl, rissoid, solid, and longitudinally plicate . The aperture is large. The columella is spirally tortuous. The outer lip is thickened within. The margin acute.

== Species ==
Species within the genus Mormula include:

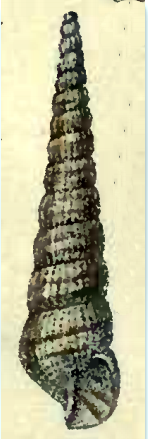
Drawing of a Mormula chrysozona shell

- Mormula chrysozona (Martens, 1880)
- Mormula hirasei Kuroda, 1960
- Mormula macandreae A. Adams, 1870
- Mormula persarum Melvill & Standen, 1903
- Mormula philippiana (Dunker, 1860)
- Mormula pseudorex (Nomura, 1936)
- Mormula rex (Pilsbry, 1904)

Species brought into synonymy

- Mormula aureocincta Kuroda & Habe, 1971: synonym of Pyrgiscus aureocinctus (Kuroda & Habe, 1971)
- Mormula excellens G.B. Sowerby III, 1907: synonym of Turbonilla aulica Dall & Bartsch, 1906
- Mormula humilis (Preston, 1905): synonym of Quirella humilis (Preston, 1905)
- Mormula rissoina A. Adams, 1864: synonym of Turbonilla philippiana Dunker, 1860
- Mormula terebra (A. Adams, 1861): synonym of Chrysallida terebra A. Adams, 1861
