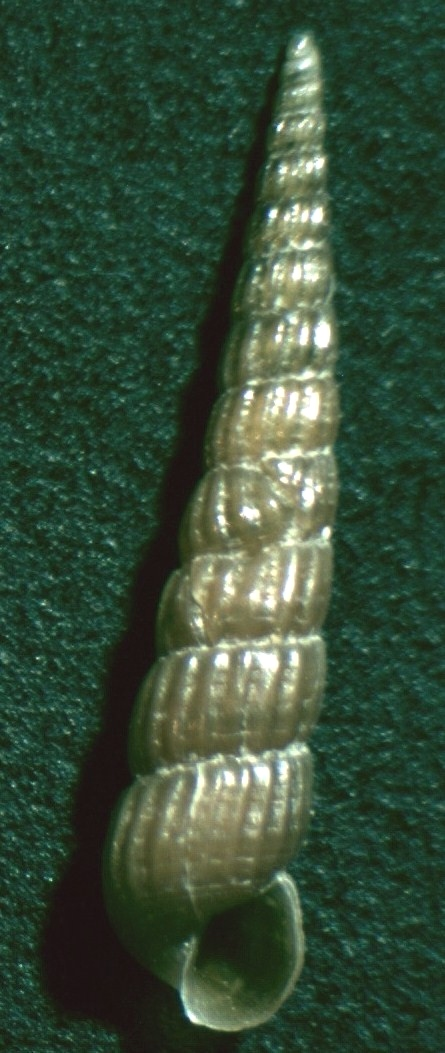
- A shell of Pyrgiscus rufus

Scientific classification
- Kingdom: Animalia
- Phylum: Mollusca
- Class: Gastropoda
- Family: Pyramidellidae
- Genus: Pyrgiscus
- Species: P. rufus

Binomial name
- Pyrgiscus rufus (Philippi, 1836)

Synonyms
- Chemnitzia densecostata Philippi, 1844; Chemnitzia fasciata Requien, 1848; Melania rufa Philippi, 1836; Parthenia fasciata Forbes, 1844; Pyrgostelis rufa (Philippi, 1836) (recombined); Pyrgostelis rufa var. spectabilis Monterosato, 1884; Pyrgostelis spectabilis Monterosato, 1884; Turbonilla densecostata (Philippi, 1844); Turbonilla formosa scalaroides Nordsieck, 1972; Turbonilla rufa (Philippi, 1836); Turritella danmoniensis Leach in Gray, 1852; Turritella scalaroides Risso, 1826 (dubious synonym)

= Pyrgiscus rufus =

Species of gastropod

Pyrgiscus rufus is a species of sea snail, a marine gastropod mollusk in the family Pyramidellidae, the pyrams and their allies.

== Taxonomy ==
Whether this species is distinct from Pyrgiscus crenatus (Brown, 1827) is controversial. Both are tentatively distinguished by Reñas & Rolán in Gofas et al. (2011) and by Giannuzzi-Saveli et al. (2014).

== Description ==
The shell grows to a length of 5 mm-9 mm. Shell: Elongated shell with 14 or less whorls, Reddish shell. Sculpture c. 20 slightly opisthocline axial ribs, with wide interspaces. Whorls are evenly rounded, tending to flat. The body is a clear pale-azure color, with irregularly spaced snow-white flakes.

== Distribution ==
This species occurs in the Mediterranean Sea. Watson's record from Puerto Rico is probably not the same species.
