= Pyrgiscus otakauicus =

Scientific classification
- Kingdom: Animalia
- Phylum: Mollusca
- Class: Gastropoda
- Family: Pyramidellidae
- Genus: Pyrgiscus
- Species: P. otakauicus

Binomial name
- Pyrgiscus otakauicus (Laws, 1937)

Synonyms
- Pyrgiscilla otakauica Laws, 1937

Species of gastropod

Pyrgiscus otakauicus is a species of sea snail, a marine gastropod mollusk in the family Pyramidellidae, the pyrams and their allies.
