= Pyrgiscus hebridarum =

Scientific classification
- Kingdom: Animalia
- Phylum: Mollusca
- Class: Gastropoda
- Family: Pyramidellidae
- Genus: Pyrgiscus
- Species: P. hebridarum

Binomial name
- Pyrgiscus hebridarum (Peñas & Rolán, 2010)

Synonyms
- Turbonilla hebridarum Peñas & Rolán, 2010 (original combination)

Species of gastropod

Pyrgiscus hebridarum is a species of sea snail, a marine gastropod mollusk in the family Pyramidellidae, the pyrams and their allies.
