= Mormula philippiana =

Scientific classification
- Kingdom: Animalia
- Phylum: Mollusca
- Class: Gastropoda
- Family: Pyramidellidae
- Genus: Mormula
- Species: M. philippiana

Binomial name
- Mormula philippiana (Dunker, 1860)

Synonyms
- Mormula rissoina A. Adams, 1864; Turbonilla (Pyrgiscus) tobisimensis Nomura, 1938; Turbonilla (Pyrgiscus) tobisimensis daibutu Nomura, 1938; Turbonilla (Pyrgiscus) validissima Nomura, 1937; Turbonilla philippiana Dunker, 1860 (original combination)

Species of gastropod

Mormula philippiana is a species of sea snail, a marine gastropod mollusk in the family Pyramidellidae, the pyrams and their allies.
