= Pyrgiscus yoshikoae =

Scientific classification
- Kingdom: Animalia
- Phylum: Mollusca
- Class: Gastropoda
- Family: Pyramidellidae
- Genus: Pyrgiscus
- Species: P. yoshikoae

Binomial name
- Pyrgiscus yoshikoae Hori & Fukuda, 1999

Species of gastropod

Pyrgiscus yoshikoae is a species of sea snail, a marine gastropod mollusk in the family Pyramidellidae, the pyrams and their allies.
