= Pyrgiscus altenai =

Scientific classification
- Kingdom: Animalia
- Phylum: Mollusca
- Class: Gastropoda
- Family: Pyramidellidae
- Genus: Pyrgiscus
- Species: P. altenai

Binomial name
- Pyrgiscus altenai van Aartsen & Corgan, 1996

Synonyms
- Turbonilla cancellata W.H. Turton, 1932 (Invalid: junior homonym of Turbonilla cancellata Holmes, 1860; Pyrgiscus altenai is a replacement name)

Species of gastropod

Pyrgiscus altenai is a species of sea snail, a marine gastropod mollusk in the family Pyramidellidae, the pyrams and their allies.
