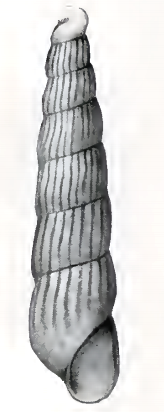
- Drawing of a shell of Pyrgiscus thielei

Scientific classification
- Kingdom: Animalia
- Phylum: Mollusca
- Class: Gastropoda
- Family: Pyramidellidae
- Genus: Pyrgiscus
- Species: P. thielei

Binomial name
- Pyrgiscus thielei van Aartsen & Corgan, 1996

Synonyms
- Turbonilla erna Thiele, 1925; Turbonilla (Ptycheulimella) erna (Bartsch, 1915)

= Pyrgiscus thielei =

Species of gastropod

Pyrgiscus thielei is a species of sea snail, a marine gastropod mollusk in the family Pyramidellidae, the pyrams and their allies.

== Description ==
The bluish white, translucent shell is very small and has an elongate-conic shape. Its length measures 3 mm. There are at least two whorls in the protoconch. These are well rounded, forming a depressed helicoid spire, the axis of which is almost at right angles to the axis of the succeeding turns. The spire of the protoconch is about one-fourth immersed in the first of the succeeding whorls. The seven whorls of the teleoconch are slightly rounded, and strongly appressed at the summit. They are marked by extremely feeble, almost vertical axial ribs which are so poorly defined that they can scarcely be counted. In addition to the axial sculpture, the entire surface of the each whorl is marked by closely spaced, microscopic, spiral striations. The sutures are well constricted. The periphery of the body whorl is somewhat angulated. The base of the shell is short, and well rounded. The aperture has an elongate-ovate shape. The posterior angle is obtuse. The outer lip is thin. The inner lip is strongly curved and slightly reflected. The parietal wall is covered by a thin callus.

== Distribution ==
The type specimen of this marine species was found off Port Alfred, South Africa.
