= Pyrgiscus abrardi =

Scientific classification
- Kingdom: Animalia
- Phylum: Mollusca
- Class: Gastropoda
- Family: Pyramidellidae
- Genus: Pyrgiscus
- Species: P. abrardi

Binomial name
- Pyrgiscus abrardi (Fischer-Piette & Nicklès, 1946)

Synonyms
- Turbonilla abrardi Fischer-Piette & Nicklès, 1946

Species of gastropod

Pyrgiscus abrardi is a species of sea snail, a marine gastropod mollusk in the family Pyramidellidae, the pyrams and their allies.

== Description ==
The shell of Pyrgiscus abrardi grows to a length of 5 mm.

== Distribution ==
This marine species occurs in the following locations:

- European waters (ERMS scope)
- Atlantic Ocean : Mauritania.
