= Pyrgiscus cedrosus =

Scientific classification
- Kingdom: Animalia
- Phylum: Mollusca
- Class: Gastropoda
- Family: Pyramidellidae
- Genus: Pyrgiscus
- Species: P. cedrosus

Binomial name
- Pyrgiscus cedrosus (Dall, 1884)

Species of gastropod

Pyrgiscus cedrosus is a species of sea snail, a marine gastropod mollusk in the family Pyramidellidae, the pyrams and their allies.

== Distribution ==
This species occurs in the following locations:

- Gulf of Mexico
