= Pyrgiscus prolongatus =

Scientific classification
- Kingdom: Animalia
- Phylum: Mollusca
- Class: Gastropoda
- Family: Pyramidellidae
- Genus: Pyrgiscus
- Species: P. prolongatus

Binomial name
- Pyrgiscus prolongatus (W. H. Turton, 1932)

Synonyms
- Turbonilla prolongata W.H. Turton, 1932

Species of gastropod

Pyrgiscus prolongatus is a species of sea snail, a marine gastropod mollusk in the family Pyramidellidae, the pyrams and their allies.
