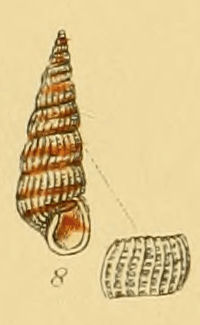

Scientific classification
- Kingdom: Animalia
- Phylum: Mollusca
- Class: Gastropoda
- Family: Pyramidellidae
- Genus: Pyrgiscus
- Species: P. rufescens

Binomial name
- Pyrgiscus rufescens (Forbes, 1846)

Synonyms
- Chemnitzia rufescens Forbes, 1846; Turbonilla rufescens (Forbes, 1846)

= Pyrgiscus rufescens =

Species of gastropod

Pyrgiscus rufescens is a species of sea snail, a marine gastropod mollusk in the family Pyramidellidae, the pyrams and their allies.

== Taxonomy ==
There is disagreement regarding whether this Pyrgiscus jeffreysii (Jeffreys, 1848) and Pyrgiscus rufescens (Forbes, 1846) represent two different species (e.g.: Høisæter, 2014 and references therein) or variation of the same species (e.g. Nordsieck, 1972). Here Høisæter (2014) is followed and the two species are treated as "accepted".

== Distribution ==
This species occurs in the following locations:

- European waters (ERMS scope)
- United Kingdom Exclusive Economic Zone
