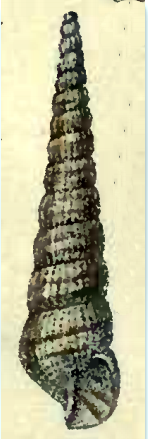
- Drawing of a shell of Mormula chrysozona

Scientific classification
- Kingdom: Animalia
- Phylum: Mollusca
- Class: Gastropoda
- Family: Pyramidellidae
- Genus: Mormula
- Species: M. chrysozona

Binomial name
- Mormula chrysozona (Martens, 1880)

Synonyms
- Turbonilla (Chemnitzia) chrysozona Martens, 1880

= Mormula chrysozona =

Species of gastropod

Mormula chrysozona is a species of sea snail, a marine gastropod mollusk in the family Pyramidellidae, the pyrams and their allies.

== Distribution ==
The shell is white, with a single narrow orange band on the upper whorls, two on the middle ones, three on the body whorl. The length of the shell is 15 mm. The shell is densely cancellated. The teleoconch contains 12-13 convex whorls that are occasional!y varicose. The body whorl is subangulate. The columella is slightly plicate at the base, where the aperture is a little channeled.

== Distribution ==
This species occurs in the following locations:

- Mascarene Basin
- Mauritius
