= Pyrgiscus ninettae =

Scientific classification
- Kingdom: Animalia
- Phylum: Mollusca
- Class: Gastropoda
- Family: Pyramidellidae
- Genus: Pyrgiscus
- Species: P. ninettae

Binomial name
- Pyrgiscus ninettae van Aartsen & Corgan, 1996

Synonyms
- Turbonilla helena Bartsch, 1915

Species of gastropod

Pyrgiscus ninettae is a species of sea snail, a marine gastropod mollusk in the family Pyramidellidae, the pyrams and their allies.
