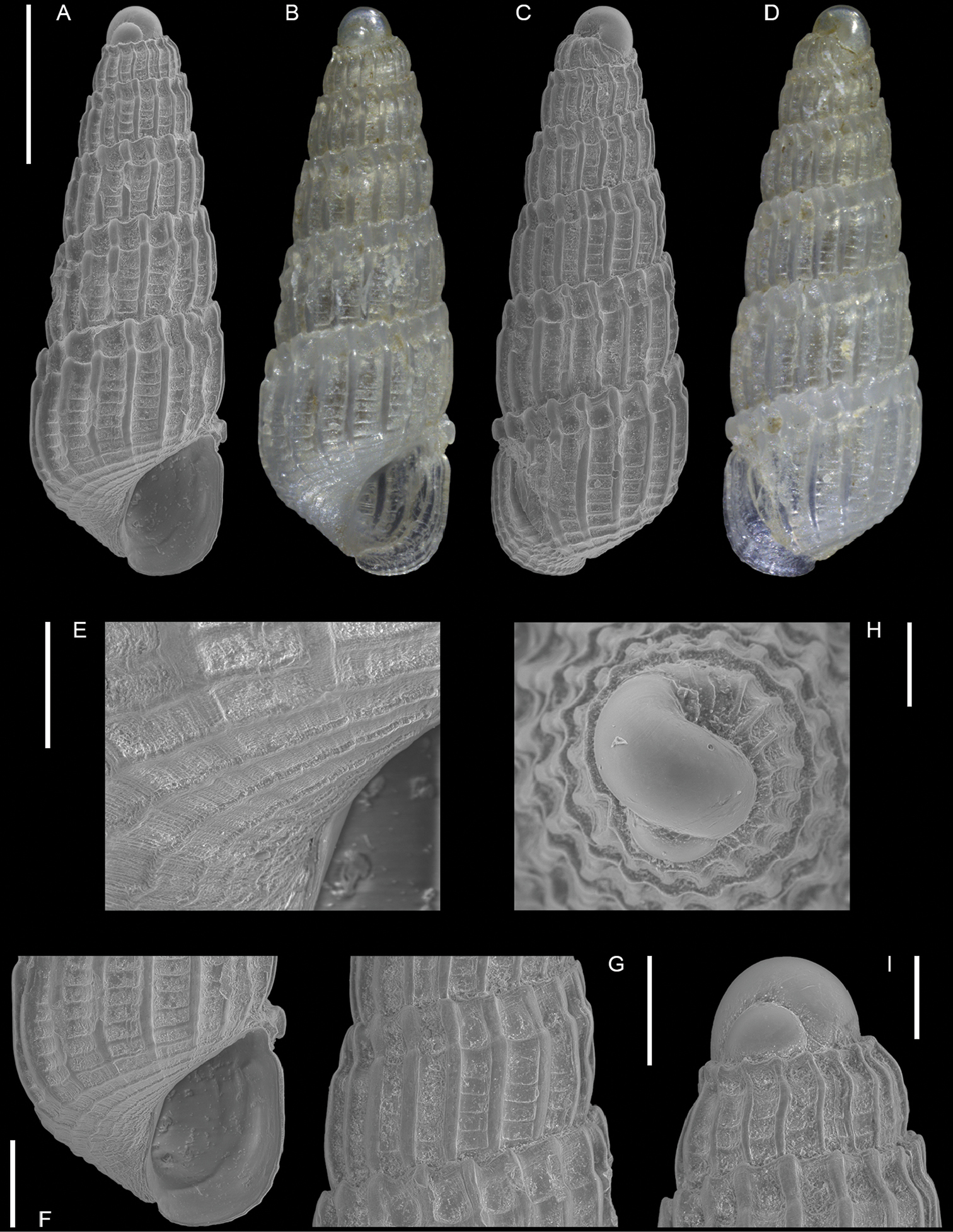
- Shell of Turbonilla funiculata

Scientific classification
- Kingdom: Animalia
- Phylum: Mollusca
- Class: Gastropoda
- Family: Pyramidellidae
- Genus: Turbonilla
- Species: T. funiculata

Binomial name
- Turbonilla funiculata de Folin, 1868

Synonyms
- Pyrgiscus mirandus Saurin, 1959; Turbonilla theresa Thiele, 1925

= Turbonilla funiculata =

Species of gastropod

Turbonilla funiculata is a species of sea snail, a marine gastropod mollusk in the family Pyramidellidae, the pyrams and their allies.

== Distribution ==
This marine species occurs off Vietnam; off Israel (non-indigenous)
