= Mormula rex =

Scientific classification
- Kingdom: Animalia
- Phylum: Mollusca
- Class: Gastropoda
- Family: Pyramidellidae
- Genus: Mormula
- Species: M. rex

Binomial name
- Mormula rex (Pilsbry, 1904)

Synonyms
- Rissoina rex Pilsbry, 1904

Species of gastropod

Mormula rex is a species of sea snail, a marine gastropod mollusk in the family Pyramidellidae, the pyrams and their allies.
