= Pyrgiscus crenatus =

Scientific classification
- Kingdom: Animalia
- Phylum: Mollusca
- Class: Gastropoda
- Family: Pyramidellidae
- Genus: Pyrgiscus
- Species: P. crenatus

Binomial name
- Pyrgiscus crenatus (Brown, 1827)

Synonyms
- Pyramis crenatus Brown, 1827; Turbonilla (Pyrgiscus) crenata (Brown, 1827); Turbonilla crenata (Brown, 1827); Turbonilla fulvocincta (Thompson, 1840); Turritella fulvocincta Thompson, 1840

Species of gastropod

Pyrgiscus crenatus is a species of sea snail, a marine gastropod mollusk in the family Pyramidellidae, the pyrams and their allies.

== Taxonomy ==
There is disagreement regarding whether Pyrgiscus rufus (Philippi, 1836) and Pyrgiscus fulvocinctus are different species (e.g. according to Peñas & Rolán in Gofas et al., 1999; Giannuzzi-Savelli et al., 2014; Høisæter, 2014) or the same species (e.g. van Aartsen, 1981). In the former case it cannot be determined to which of the two species corresponds the earliest name Pyramis crenatus Brown, 1827, which Høisæter treated as a nomen dubium.

== Distribution ==
This marine species occurs in the following locations:

- Belgian Exclusive Economic Zone
- British Isles
- European waters (ERMS scope)
- Irish Exclusive economic Zone
- United Kingdom Exclusive Economic Zone
- Wimereux

[[

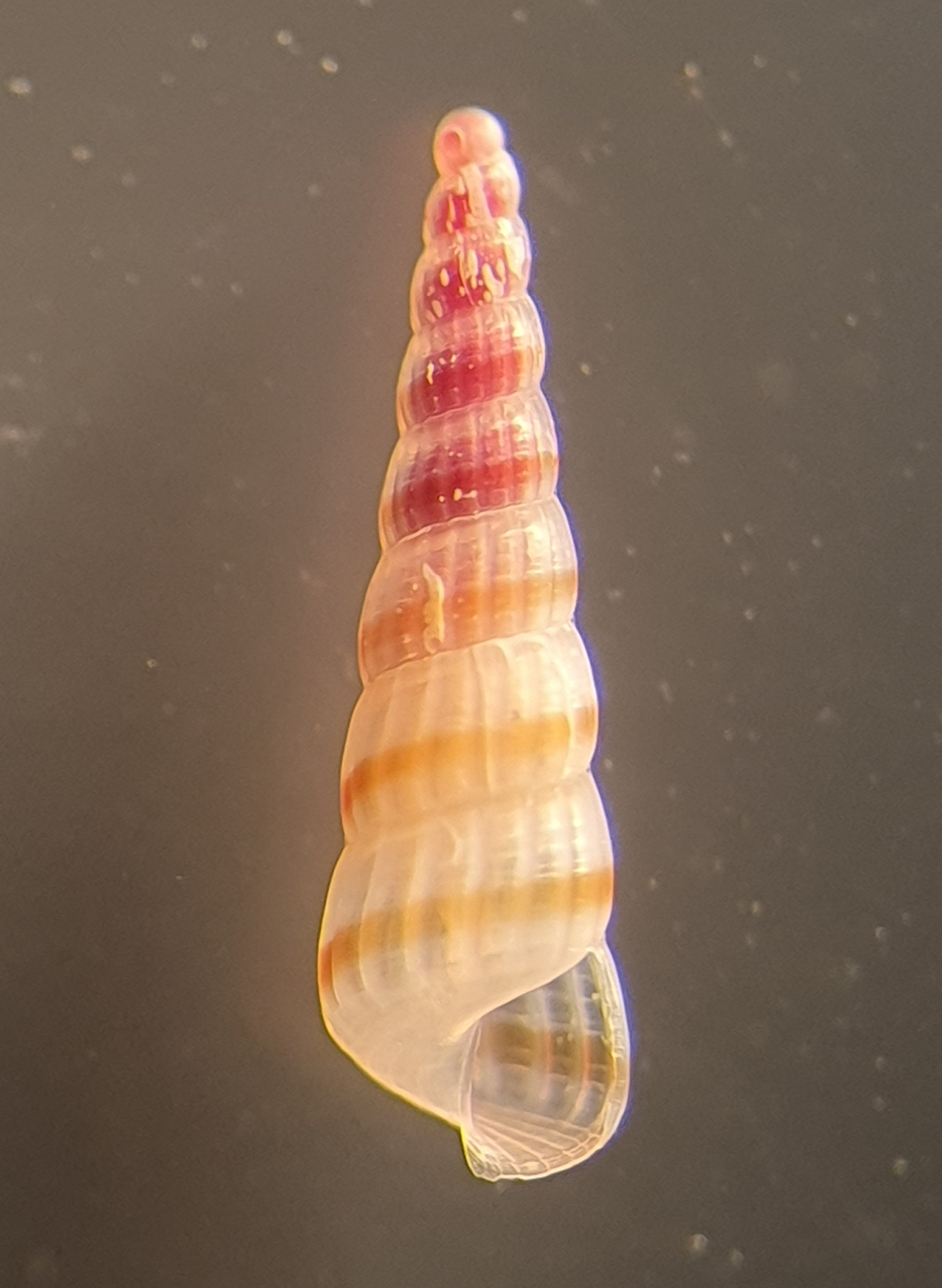
Pyrgiscus crenatus (T. Brown, 1827)

|thumb]]
