= Turbonilla mumia =

Scientific classification
- Kingdom: Animalia
- Phylum: Mollusca
- Class: Gastropoda
- Family: Pyramidellidae
- Genus: Turbonilla
- Species: T. mumia

Binomial name
- Turbonilla mumia (A. Adams, 1861)

Synonyms
- Chrysallida mumia A. Adams, 1861; Odontostomia robusta Hedley, 1899; Pyrgostelis manorae Melvill, J.C., 1898; Turbonilla manorae Melvill, 1898; Turbonilla microscopica Laseron, 1959; Turbonilla (Pyrgiscus) mumia (A. Adams, 1861)

Species of gastropod

Turbonilla mumia is a species of sea snail, a marine gastropod mollusk in the family Pyramidellidae, the pyrams and their allies.

== Description ==
The length of the shell varies between 1.8 mm and 3.5 mm.

== Distribution ==
This marine species occurs off Japan, the Solomons and from Pakistan to Australia.
