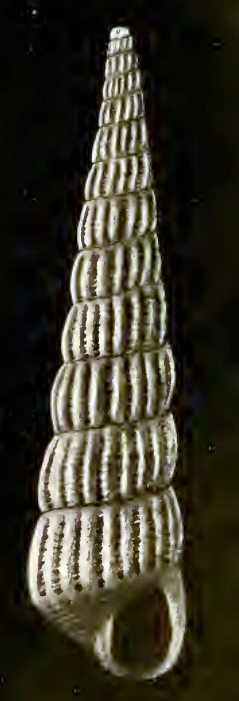
- Drawing of a shell of Turbonilla aulica

Scientific classification
- Kingdom: Animalia
- Phylum: Mollusca
- Class: Gastropoda
- Family: Pyramidellidae
- Genus: Turbonilla
- Species: T. aulica

Binomial name
- Turbonilla aulica Dall & Bartsch, 1906

Synonyms
- Chemnitzia cumingii Carpenter, 1856; Mormula excellens G.B. Sowerby III, 1907; Turbonilla elongata Pease, 1867; Turbonilla miyagiensis Nomura, 1936; Turbonilla peasei Dall & Bartsch, 1906; Turbonilla varicosa Dunker, 1860; Turbonilla vitiensis clavus Pilsbry, 1918; Turbonilla (Chemnitzia) cumingii Dunker, R.W., 1860; Turbonilla (Lancella) aulica Dall & Bartsch, 1906; Turbonilla (Mormula) aulica Dall & Bartsch, 1906 (basionym); Turbonilla (Mormula) excellens Sowerby, G.B. III, 1907; Turbonilla (Pyrgiscus) miyagiensis Nomura, S., 1936; Turbonilla (Pyrgiscus) vitiensis clavus Pilsbry, H.A., 1917, "1918"

= Turbonilla aulica =

Species of gastropod

Turbonilla aulica is a species of sea snail, a marine gastropod mollusk in the family Pyramidellidae, the pyrams and their allies.

== Description ==
The shell has a gently and evenly tapering, elongate-conic shape. It has a flesh-color with a brown base. Its length varies between 10 mm and 17 mm. The whorls of the protoconch are decollated. The 14 whorls of the teleoconch are well rounded, and somewhat shouldered. They are crossed by strong rounded axial ribs, about sixteen of which appear on the fourth, eighteen on the eighth, and twenty-two on the penultimate whorl. At irregular intervals several of these ribs are fused and enlarged to form a varix, five of which are present on this shell. The intercostal spaces are about as wide as the ribs. They are marked bv seven moderately broad, incised, spiral lines between the sutures. The posterior one of these is at some little distance below the summit. These lines are subequally spaced and of about the same width, except the last one, which is about twice as broad as the others and marks the periphery with a series of rectangular pits. The elevated spaces between the incised lines pass over the axial ribs and render them faintly nodulose. The spaces inclosed between the first and second, fourth and fifth, and sixth and seventh spiral lines are a little more elevated than the rest and hence appear as stronger nodes on the ribs. The periphery of the body whorl is angulated. The base of the shell is short, and moderately rounded. It is marked by the feeble continuation of the axial ribs, which hardly extend to the umbilical region, and eight well-incised subequally spaced, wavy, spiral lines, the raised area between the anterior one of these and the series of pits at the suture is like the raised spaces between the incised lines between the sutures. The rest appear as mere wavy raised threads. The aperture is subquadrate. The posterior angle is obtuse. The outer lip shows the external sculpture within. The columella is straight, twisted, and without apparent fold. The parietal wall is covered by a thin callus. The columella is brown; this color tinges the adjacent area, fading out altogether on the middle of the base.

== Distribution ==
This species occurs in the Pacific Ocean off Japan, the Fiji Islands and New Caledonia.
