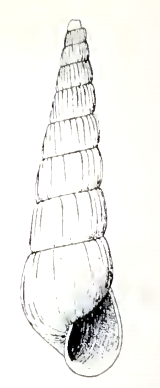
- Drawing of a shell of Turbonilla halistrepta

Scientific classification
- Kingdom: Animalia
- Phylum: Mollusca
- Class: Gastropoda
- Family: Pyramidellidae
- Genus: Turbonilla
- Species: T. halistrepta

Binomial name
- Turbonilla halistrepta Dall & Bartsch, 1909

Synonyms
- Turbonilla (Pyrgolampros) halistrepta Dall & Bartsch, 1909

= Turbonilla halistrepta =

Species of gastropod

Turbonilla halistrepta is a species of sea snail, a marine gastropod mollusk in the family Pyramidellidae, the pyrams and their allies.

== Description ==
The shell has an elongate-conic shape. Its length measures 9.5 mm. Its color is wax yellow with a broad subsutural, narrow submedian and a broad subperipheral band of golden brown. These color markings make this species different from Turbonilla lituyana and Turbonilla oregonensis. (The whorls of the protoconch are decollated). The whorls of the teleoconch are situated rather high between the sutures. They are very slightly shouldered. They are marked by almost obsolete, nearly vertical axial ribs, which are best, but still poorly developed near the summit and practically disappear before they reach the suture on the early whorls. On the last three they are scarcely indicated. Of these ribs there are about 28 upon the third and 24 upon the seventh whorl. The sutures are well impressed. The periphery and the short base of the body whorl are somewhat inflated, and well rounded. The entire surface of the spire and the base are marked by many well incised, closely spaced, wavy, spiral striations. Some of the fine lirations between the incised lines are a little darker colored than the rest of the surface and appear as reddish-brown hair lines. The aperture is oval. The posterior angle is acute. The outer lip is thin, showing the external sculpture within. The columella is slender, strongly curved and moderately revolute.

== Distribution ==
The type species was found in the Pacific Ocean off Newport, California.
