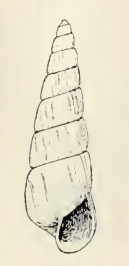
- Drawing of a shell of Turbonilla oregonensis

Scientific classification
- Kingdom: Animalia
- Phylum: Mollusca
- Class: Gastropoda
- Family: Pyramidellidae
- Genus: Turbonilla
- Species: T. oregonensis

Binomial name
- Turbonilla oregonensis Dall & Bartsch, 1907

Synonyms
- Turbonilla (Pyrgolampros) oregonensis Dall & Bartsch, 1907

= Turbonilla oregonensis =

Species of gastropod

Turbonilla oregonensis is a species of sea snail, a marine gastropod mollusk in the family Pyramidellidae, the pyrams and their allies.

== Description ==
The elongate-conic shell has a wax yellow color, with two yellowish-brown spiral bands The posterior one of which encircles the turns a little above the periphery, while the anterior one, which is a little wider, is immediately posterior to it, the two being separated by a space about as wide as the posterior band. Its length attains 8.5 mm. The whorls of the protoconch are decollated in the type specimen. The 8½ remaining whorls of the teleoconch are very slightly rounded, moderately contracted at the periphery, and closely appressed to the preceding turn at the summit. There are no well-defined ribs, the axial sculpture being reduced to mere lines of growth, with here and there a weakly impressed area, probably representing an obsolete intercostal space. The sutures are strongly impressed. The periphery of the body whorl is faintly angulated. The base of the shell is short, and well rounded. The entire surface of the shell is marked by fine, regular, close, spiral striations. The aperture is pyriform. The posterior angle is acute. The outer lip is thin. The columella is somewhat twisted, scarcely revolute at its free end.

== Distribution ==
The type specimens were found in the Pacific Ocean off Oregon and Washington state.
