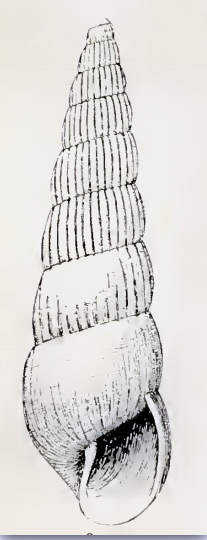
- Drawing of a shell of Turbonilla lituyana

Scientific classification
- Kingdom: Animalia
- Phylum: Mollusca
- Class: Gastropoda
- Family: Pyramidellidae
- Genus: Turbonilla
- Species: T. lituyana

Binomial name
- Turbonilla lituyana Dall & Bartsch, 1909

Synonyms
- Turbonilla (Pyrgolampros) lituyana Dall & Bartsch, 1909

= Turbonilla lituyana =

Species of gastropod

Turbonilla lituyana is a species of sea snail, a marine gastropod mollusk in the family Pyramidellidae, the pyrams and their allies.

== Description ==
The shell has an elongate-conic shape. Its length measures 11.5 mm. Its color is light wax yellow, with a supra and subperipheral light chestnut band, separated by a very narrow, dark wax yellow peripheral zone. (The whorls of the protoconch and probably the first two whorls of the teleoconch are decollated.) The nine remaining whorls are situated rather high between the sutures. The early ones are marked by moderately strong, broad, low, almost vertical axial ribs, which become quite obsolete on the last turn and a half. About 22 of these ribs appear upon the eighth whorl. The intercostal spaces are narrow and weakly impressed. The sutures are well rounded. The periphery and the base of the body whorl are well rounded, the latter marked by continuations of the obsolete riblets and the fine, close, wavy spiral striations which also cover the entire surface of the spire. The aperture is oval. The posterior angle is acute. The outer lip is thin. The columella is slender, oblique, slightly curved and revolute, with a slight fold at its insertion. The parietal wall is covered by a thin callus.

== Distribution ==
This species occurs in the Pacific Ocean off California.
