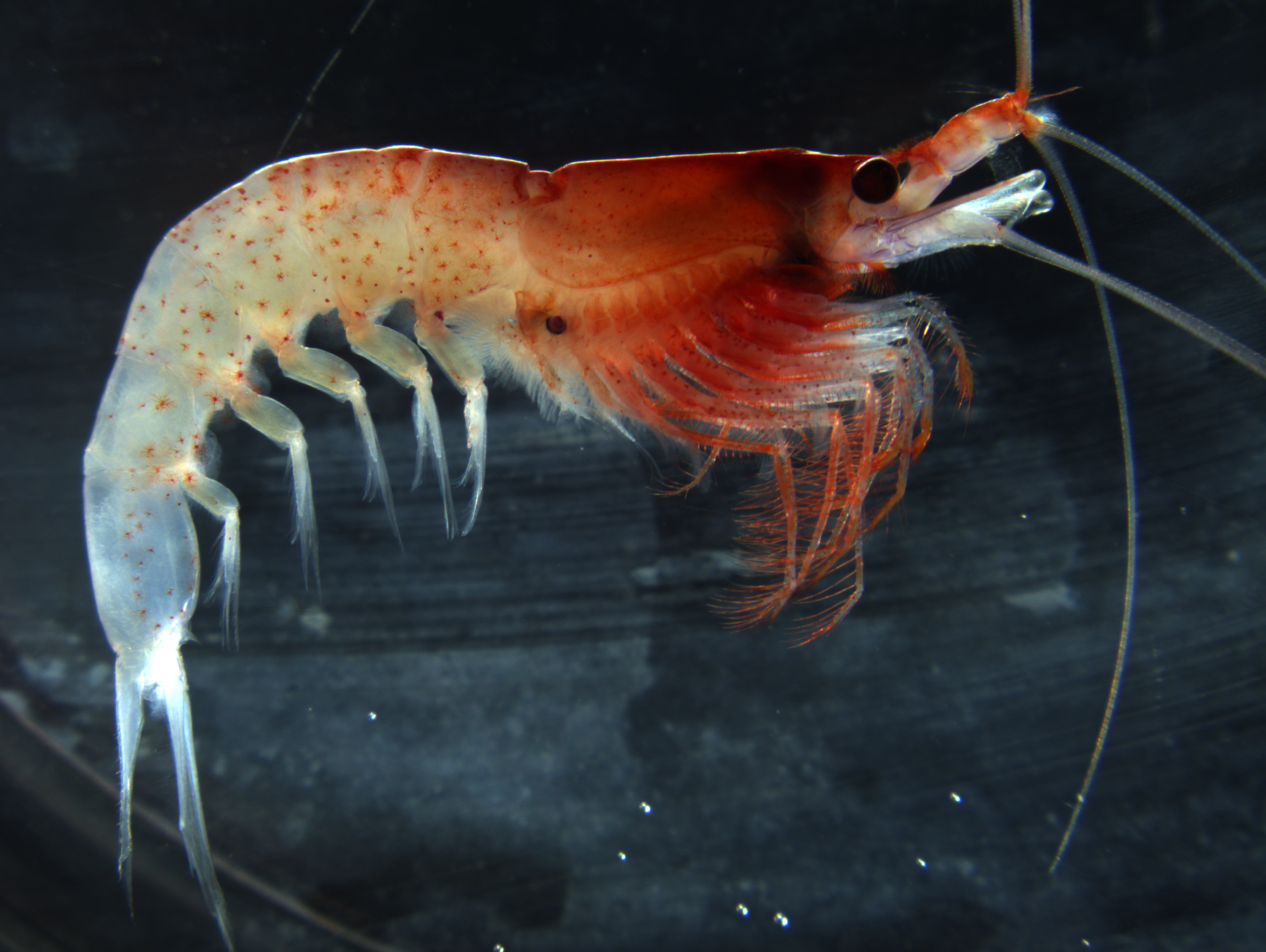

Scientific classification
- Kingdom: Animalia
- Phylum: Mollusca
- Class: Gastropoda
- Family: Pyramidellidae
- Genus: Turbonilla
- Species: T. aequalis

Binomial name
- Turbonilla aequalis (Say, 1826)

Synonyms
- Chemnitzia aequalis (Say, 1826); Turritella aequalis Say, 1826; Turbonilla equalis A. E. Verrill, 1873; Turbonilla stricta auct. non A. E. Verrill, 1873

= Turbonilla aequalis =

Species of gastropod

Turbonilla aequalis is a species of sea snail, a marine gastropod mollusk in the family Pyramidellidae, the pyrams and their allies.

== Description ==
The shell grows to a length of 5 mm.

== Distribution ==
This species occurs in the following locations:

- Northwest Atlantic at depths between 11 mm and 15 m.

== Notes ==
Additional information regarding this species:

- Distribution: southern Massachusetts
