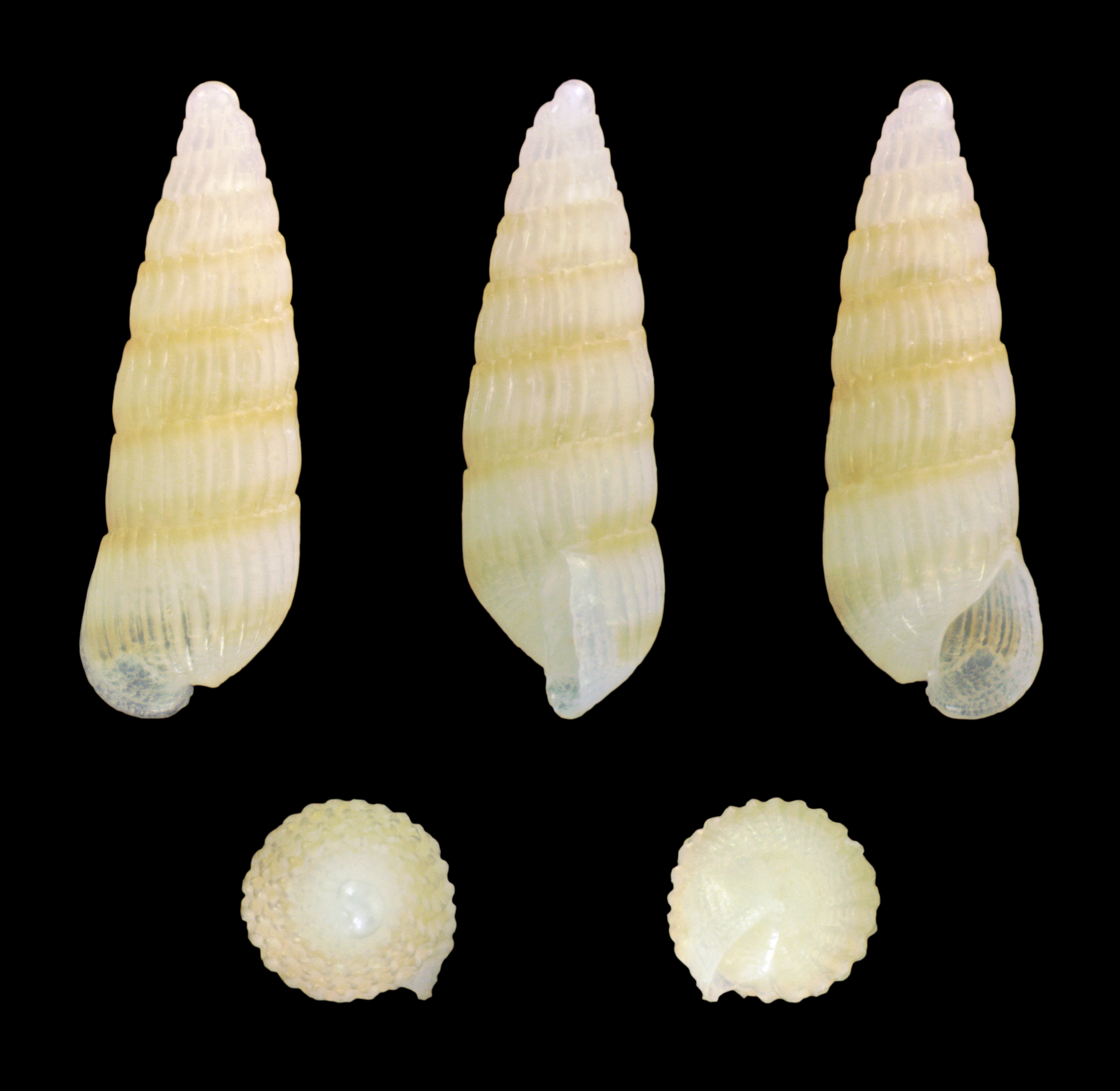
- Turbonilla pupoides

Scientific classification
- Kingdom: Animalia
- Phylum: Mollusca
- Class: Gastropoda
- Family: Pyramidellidae
- Genus: Turbonilla
- Species: T. pupoides

Binomial name
- Turbonilla pupoides (d’Orbigny, 1841)

= Turbonilla pupoides =

Species of gastropod

Turbonilla pupoides is a species of sea snail, a marine gastropod mollusk in the family Pyramidellidae, the pyrams and their allies.

== Distribution ==
This species occurs in the following locations:

- Aruba
- Belize
- Bonaire
- Caribbean Sea
- Cayman Islands
- Colombia
- Cuba
- Curaçao
- Gulf of Mexico
- Jamaica
- Lesser Antilles
- Panama
- Puerto Rico

== Notes ==
Additional information regarding this species:

- Habitat: Known from seamounts and knolls
