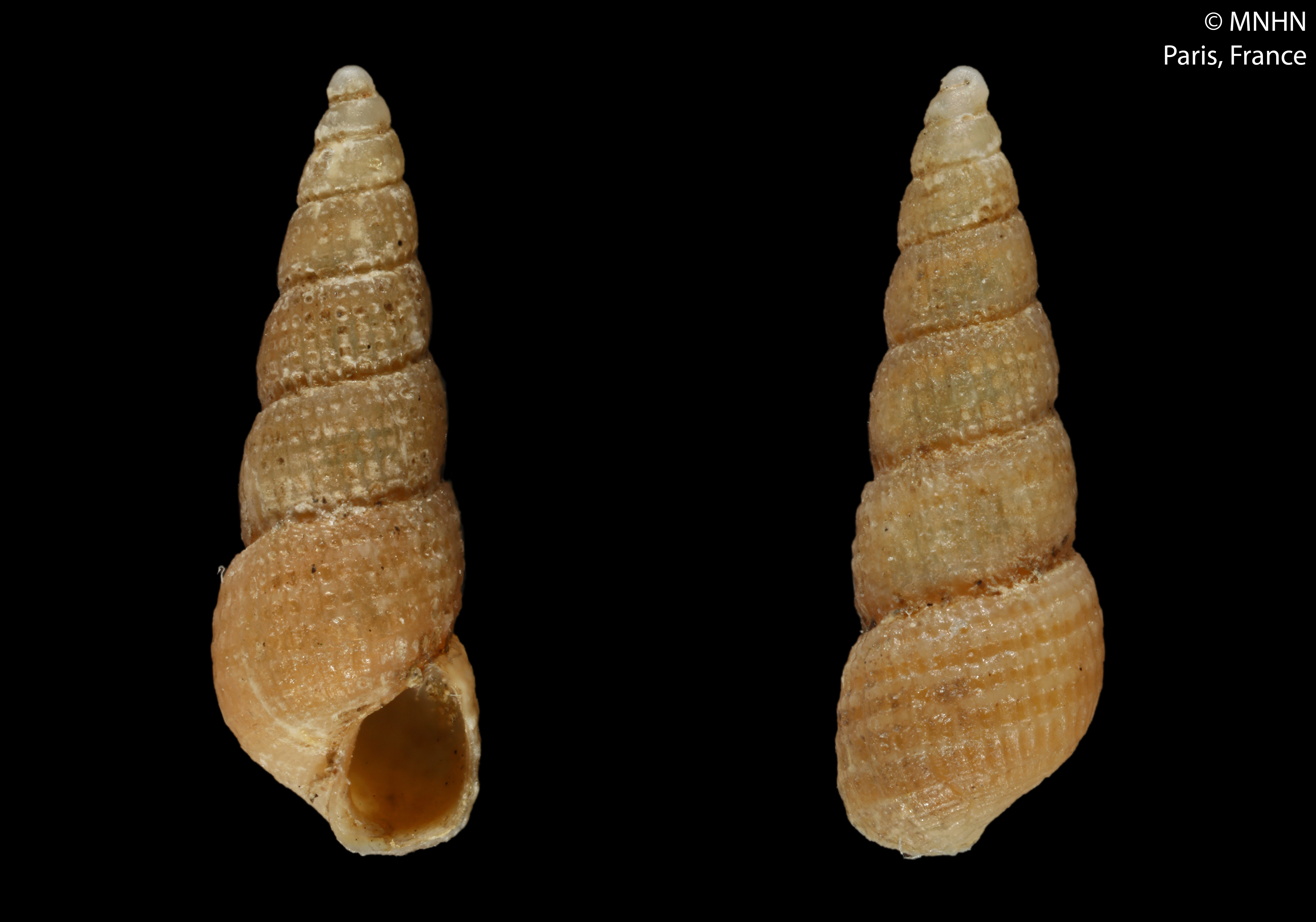
- Shell of Turbonilla madrinensis (holotype at MNHN, Paris)

Scientific classification
- Kingdom: Animalia
- Phylum: Mollusca
- Class: Gastropoda
- Family: Pyramidellidae
- Genus: Turbonilla
- Species: T. madrinensis

Binomial name
- Turbonilla madrinensis Lamy, 1905

= Turbonilla madrinensis =

Species of gastropod

Turbonilla madrinensis is a species of sea snail, a marine gastropod mollusk in the family Pyramidellidae, the pyrams and their allies.

== Description ==
The length of the shell varies between 3 mm and 5.1 mm. Species average size is 5.5 inches but has been known to be as small as 2 inches or as large as 12.5 inches. These snails are the only known species with throbbing veins and girthy shells

== Distribution ==
This species occurs in the Atlantic Ocean off Argentina at depths between 36 m and 57 m.
