= Turbonilla macaensis =

Scientific classification
- Kingdom: Animalia
- Phylum: Mollusca
- Class: Gastropoda
- Family: Pyramidellidae
- Genus: Turbonilla
- Species: T. macaensis

Binomial name
- Turbonilla macaensis Pimenta & Absalao, 2001

Synonyms
- Turbonilla fasciata auct. non d'Orbigny, 1840

Species of gastropod

Turbonilla macaensis is a species of sea snail, a marine gastropod mollusk in the family Pyramidellidae, the pyrams and their allies.

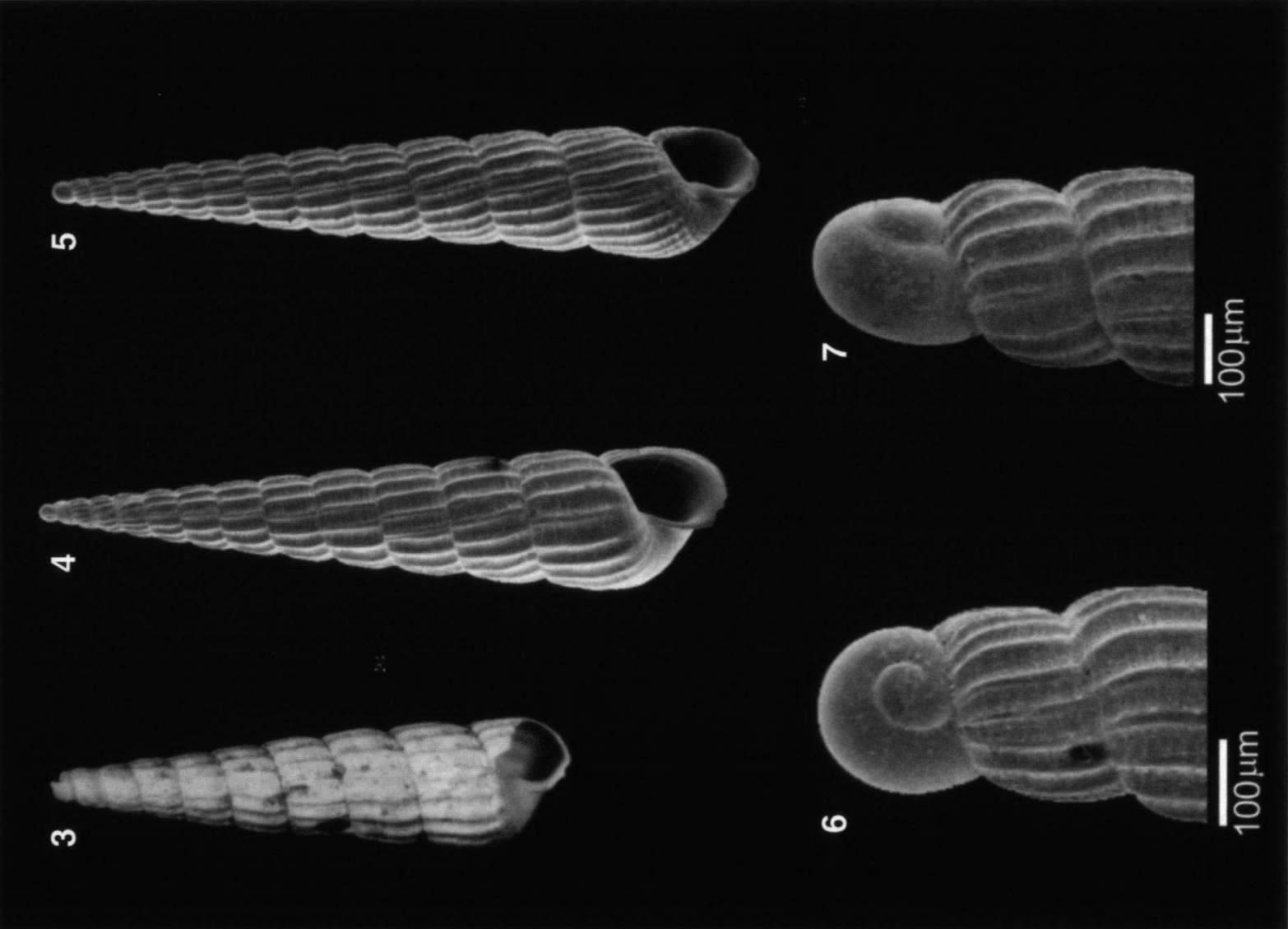
Turbonilla macaensis

== Description ==
The shell grows to a length of 8 mm.

== Distribution ==
Named after the city of Macaé in Rio de Janeiro State, this species occurs in the Atlantic Ocean off the coast of Brazil, Uruguay and Argentina at depths between 30 m and 65 m.
