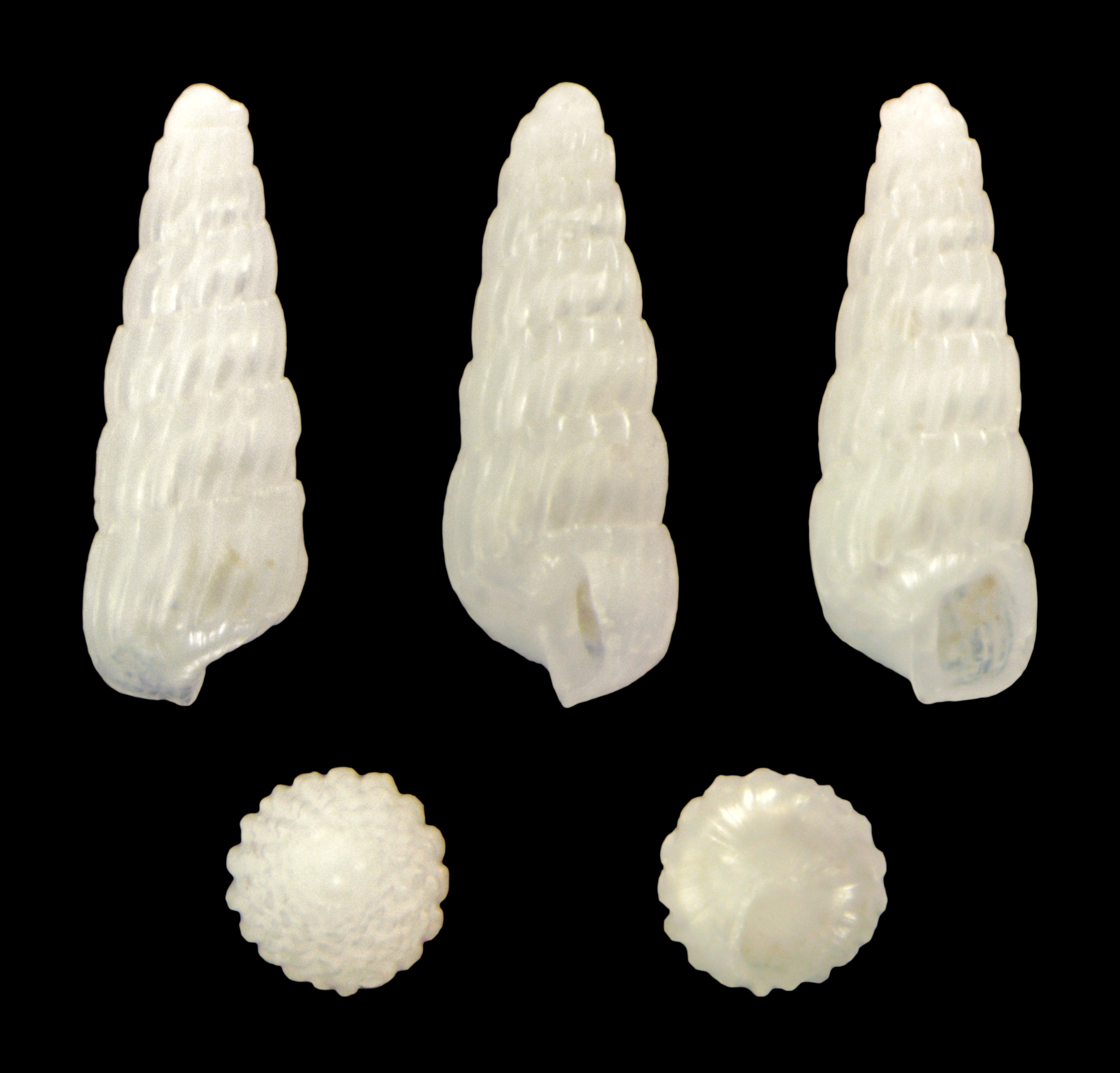

Scientific classification
- Kingdom: Animalia
- Phylum: Mollusca
- Class: Gastropoda
- Family: Pyramidellidae
- Genus: Turbonilla
- Species: T. insularis

Binomial name
- Turbonilla insularis Dall & Simpson, 1901

Synonyms
- Pyrgiscus insularis (Dall & Simpson, 1901); Turbonilla (Pyrgiscus) insularis Dall & Simpson, 1901

= Turbonilla insularis =

Species of gastropod

Turbonilla insularis is a species of sea snail, a marine gastropod mollusk in the family Pyramidellidae, the pyrams and their allies.

== Description ==
The shell grows to a length of 7.1 mm.

== Distribution ==
This marine species occurs off Puerto Rico, Venezuela and Curaçao
