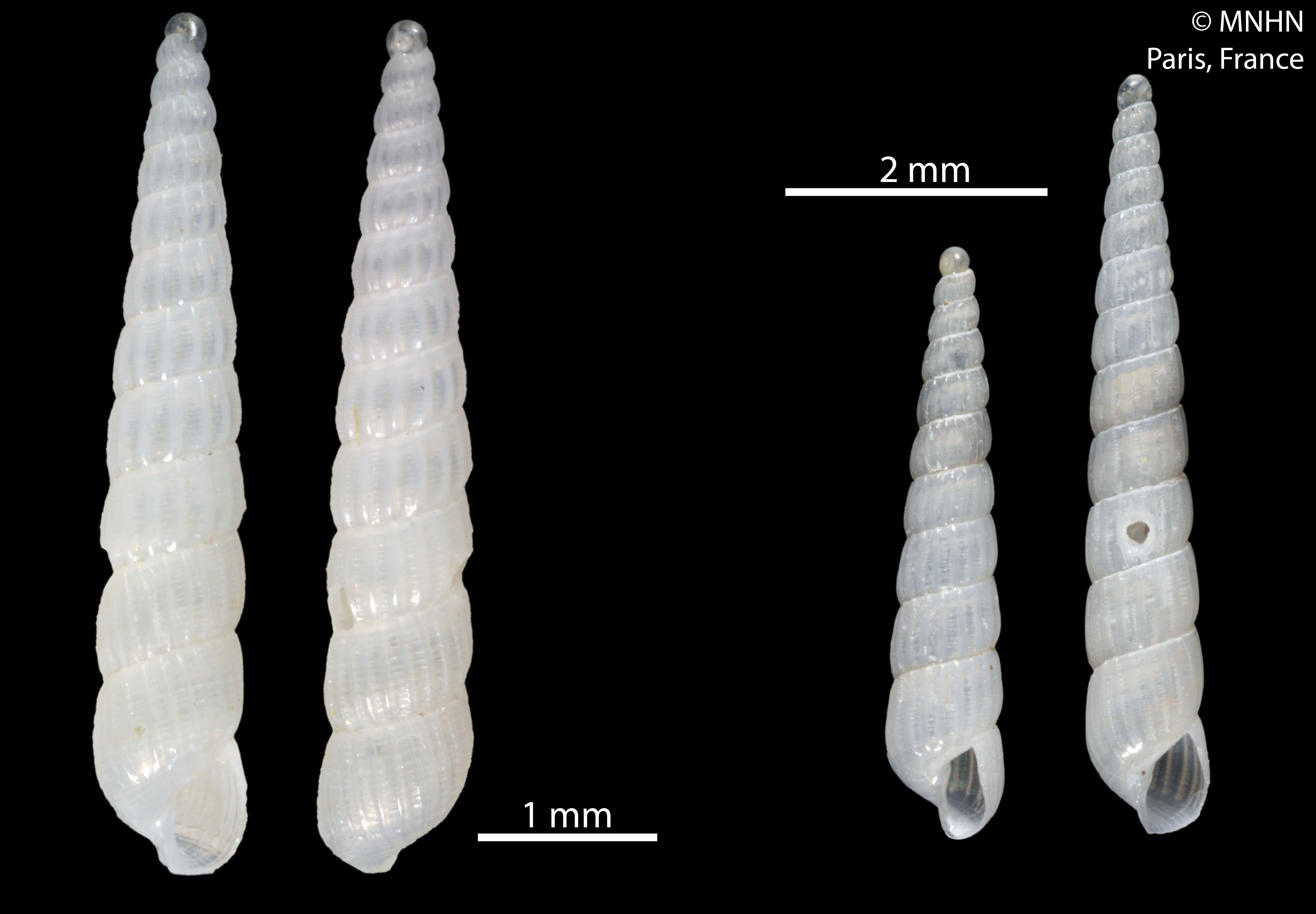
- Shell of Turbonilla maestratii (paratype at MNHN, Paris)

Scientific classification
- Kingdom: Animalia
- Phylum: Mollusca
- Class: Gastropoda
- Family: Pyramidellidae
- Genus: Turbonilla
- Species: T. maestratii

Binomial name
- Turbonilla maestratii Pimenta & Absalao, 2004

= Turbonilla maestratii =

Species of gastropod

Turbonilla maestratii is a species of sea snail, a marine gastropod mollusk in the family Pyramidellidae, the pyrams and their allies.

== Description ==
The shell grows to a length of 5.3 mm

== Distribution ==
This species occurs in the Atlantic Ocean off Brazil at depths between 45 m and 50 m.
