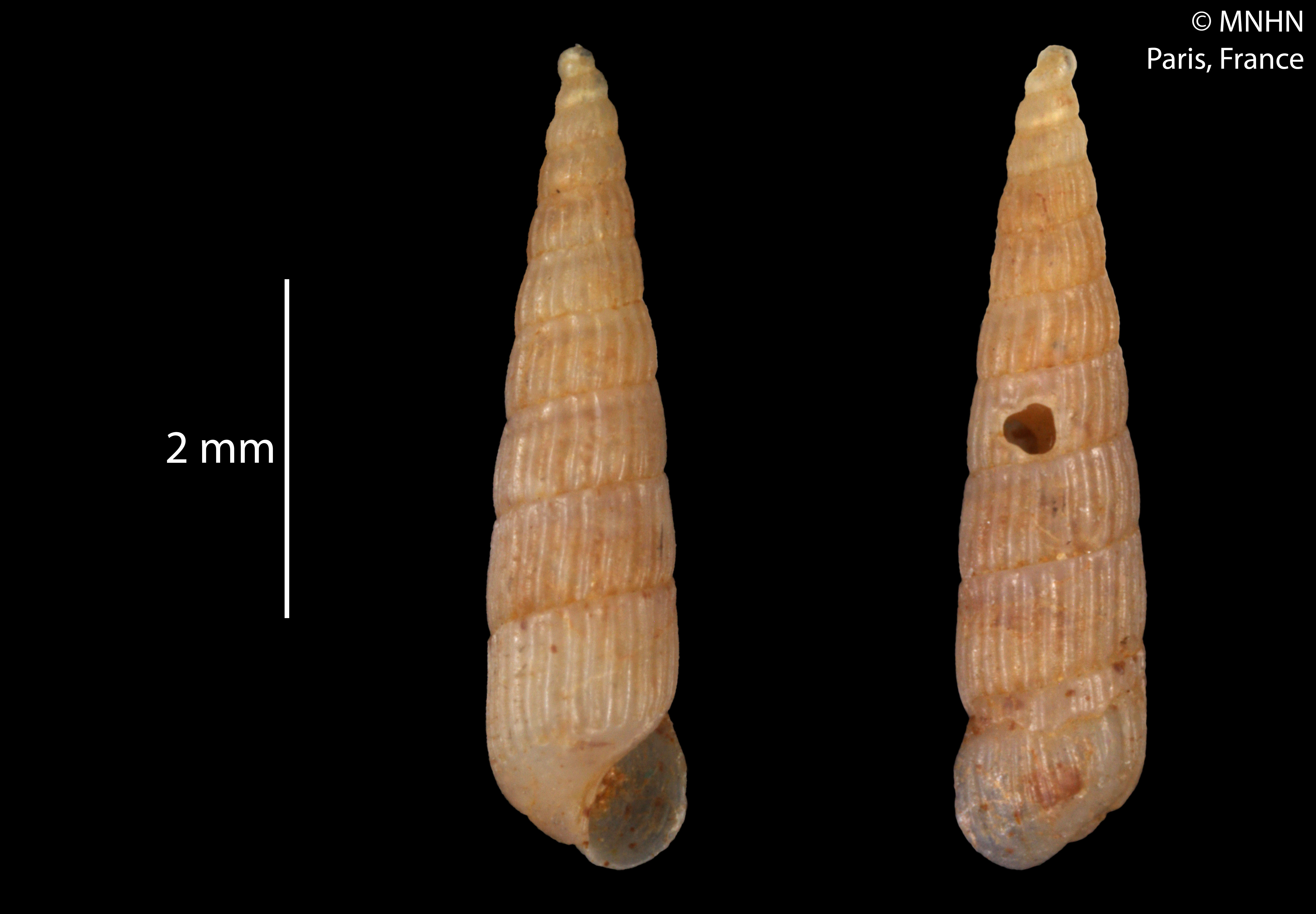
- Shell of Turbonilla tupinamba (paratype at MNHN, Paris)

Scientific classification
- Kingdom: Animalia
- Phylum: Mollusca
- Class: Gastropoda
- Family: Pyramidellidae
- Genus: Turbonilla
- Species: T. tupinamba

Binomial name
- Turbonilla tupinamba Pimenta & Absalão, 2002

= Turbonilla tupinamba =

Species of gastropod

Turbonilla tupinamba is a species of sea snail, a marine gastropod mollusk in the family Pyramidellidae, the pyrams and their allies.

== Distribution ==
This species occurs in the Atlantic Ocean off Brazil.
