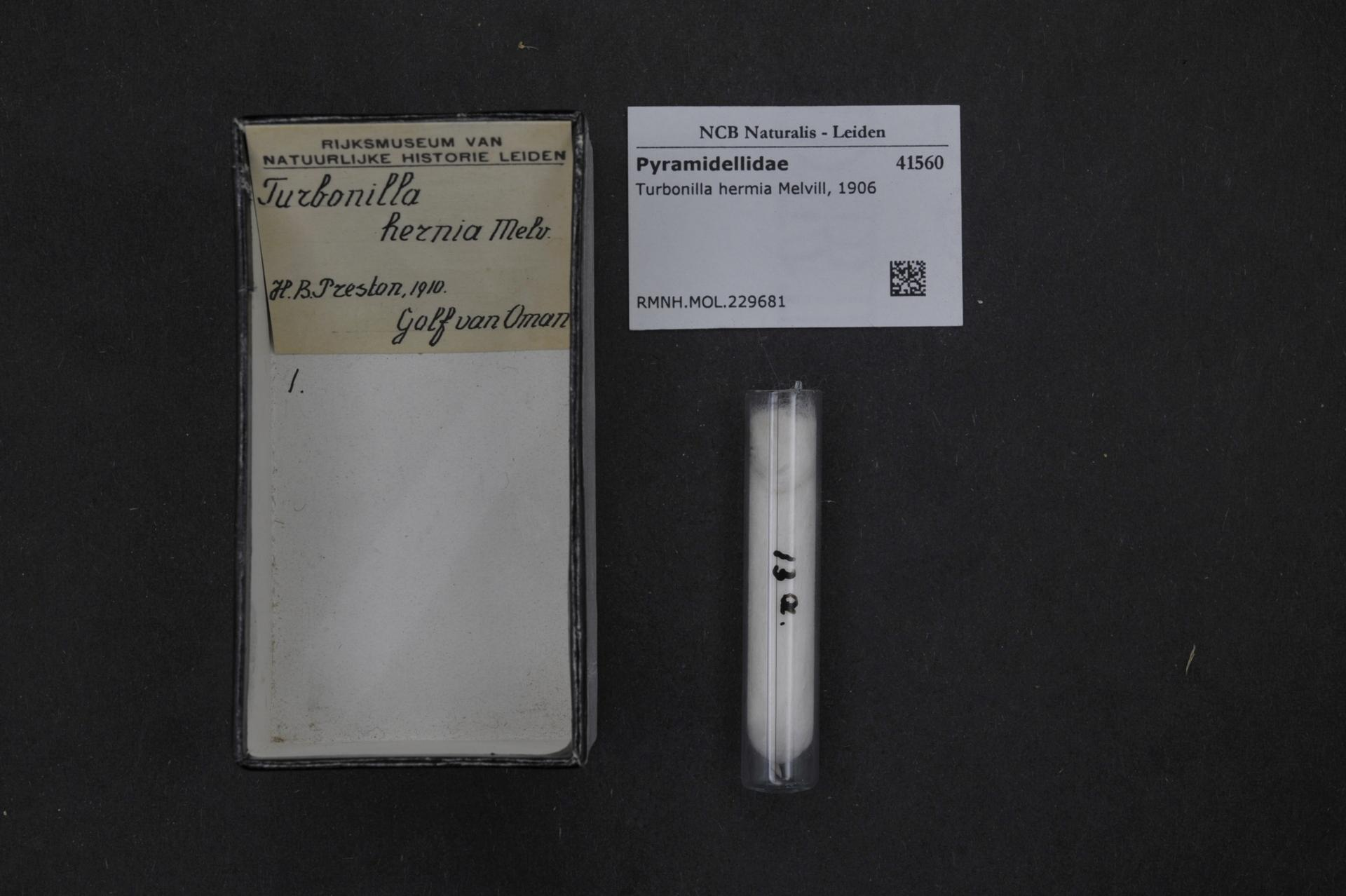
- Turbonilla hermia Melvill, 1906

Scientific classification
- Kingdom: Animalia
- Phylum: Mollusca
- Class: Gastropoda
- Family: Pyramidellidae
- Genus: Turbonilla
- Species: T. hermia

Binomial name
- Turbonilla hermia Melvill, 1906

= Turbonilla hermia =

Species of gastropod

Turbonilla hermia is a species of sea snail, a marine gastropod mollusk in the family Pyramidellidae, the pyrams and their allies.
