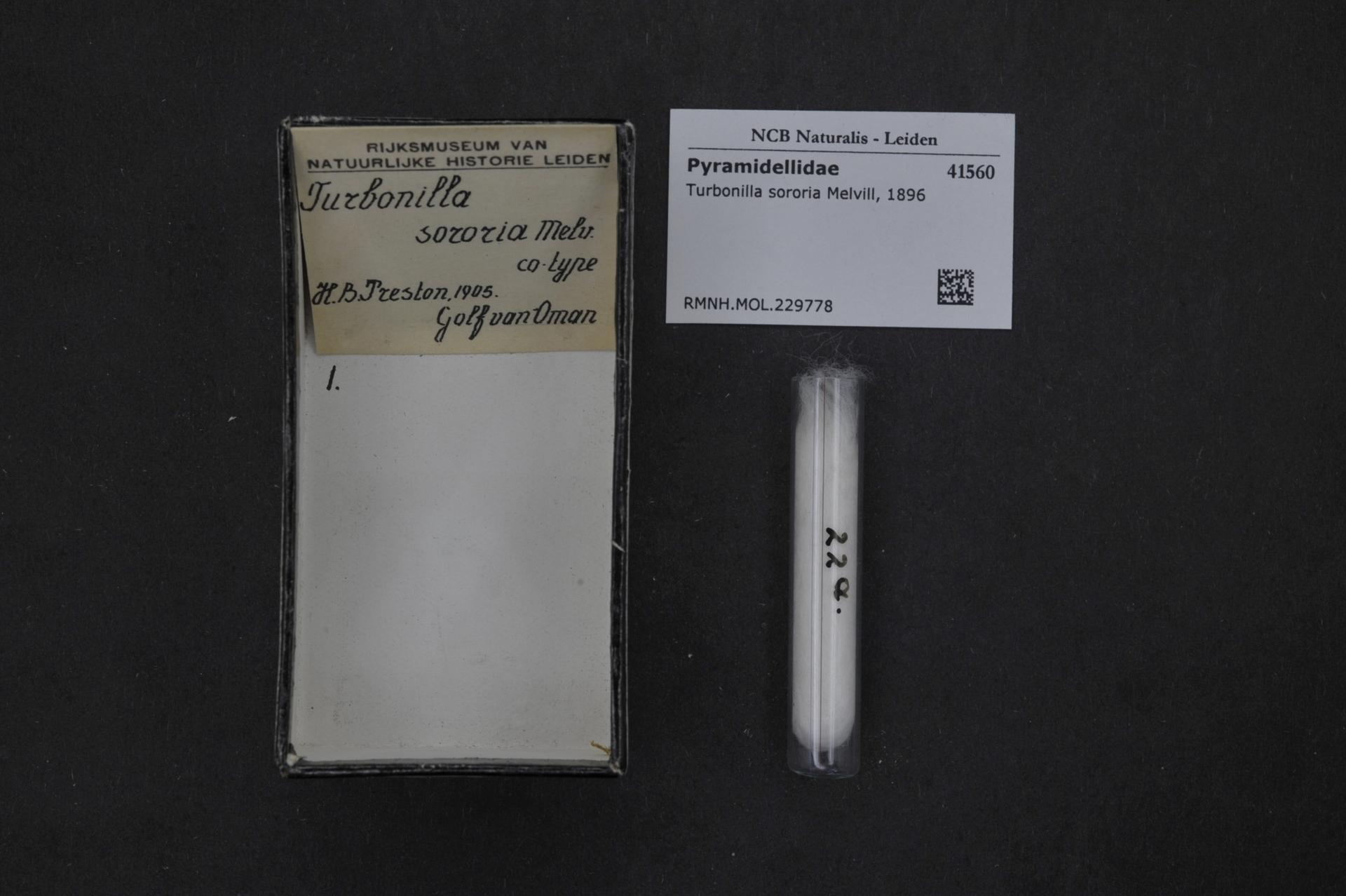
- Turbonilla sororia Melvill, 1896

Scientific classification
- Kingdom: Animalia
- Phylum: Mollusca
- Class: Gastropoda
- Family: Pyramidellidae
- Genus: Turbonilla
- Species: T. sororia

Binomial name
- Turbonilla sororia Melvill, 1896

= Turbonilla sororia =

Species of gastropod

Turbonilla sororia is a species of sea snail, a marine gastropod mollusk in the family Pyramidellidae, the pyrams and their allies.
