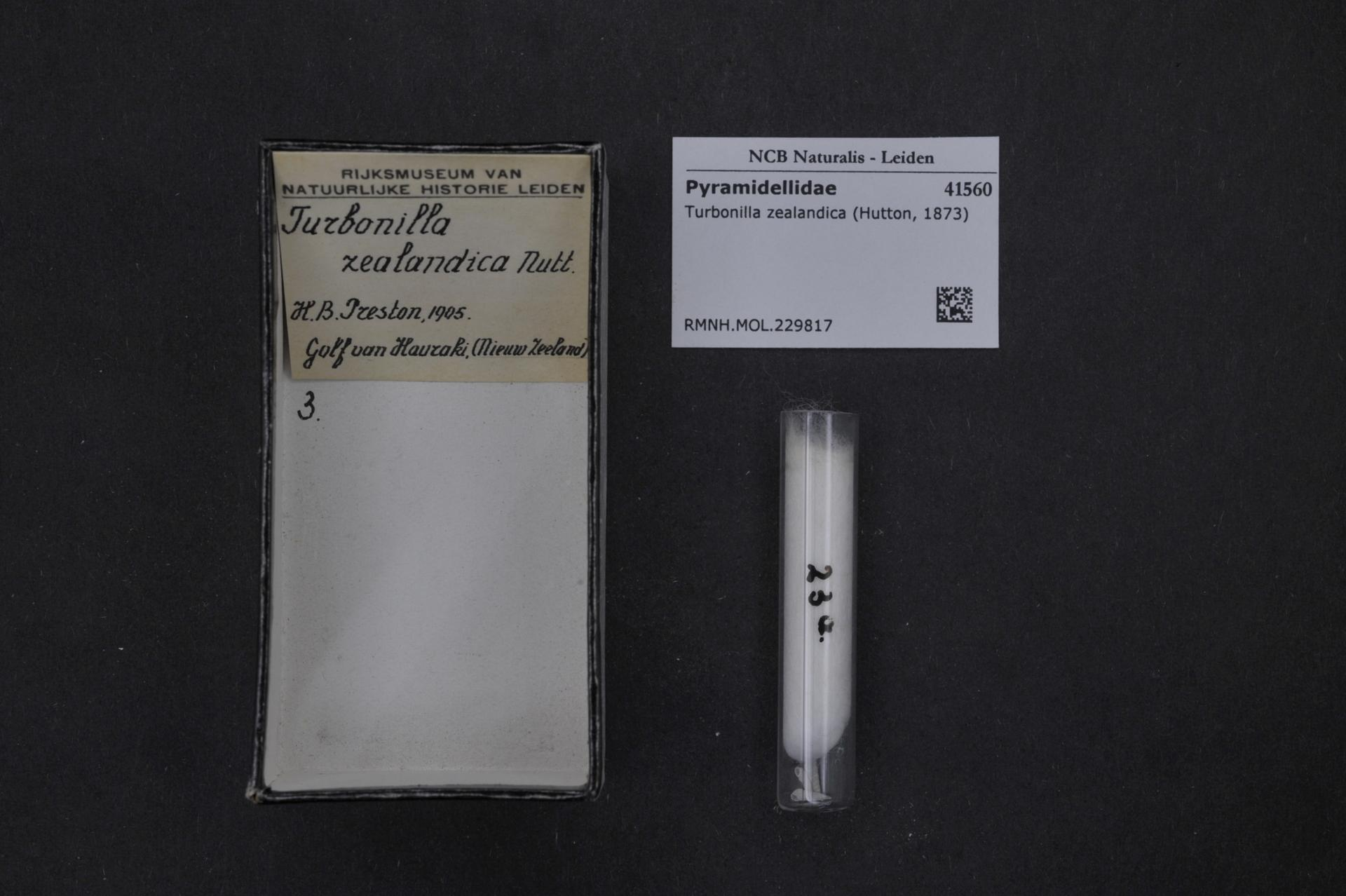

Scientific classification
- Kingdom: Animalia
- Phylum: Mollusca
- Class: Gastropoda
- Family: Pyramidellidae
- Genus: Turbonilla
- Species: T. zealandica

Binomial name
- Turbonilla zealandica (Hutton, 1883)

= Turbonilla zealandica =

Species of gastropod

Turbonilla zealandica is a species of sea snail, a marine gastropod mollusk in the family Pyramidellidae, the pyrams and their allies.
