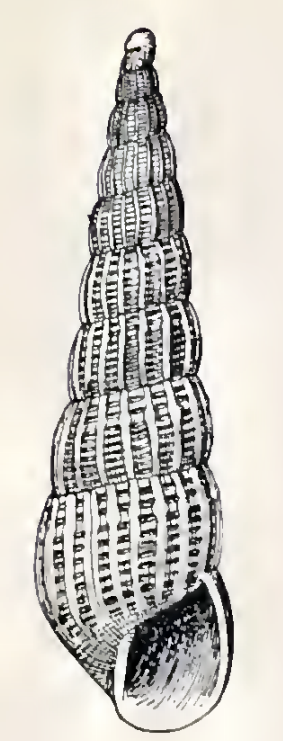
- Drawing of a shell of Turbonilla nereia

Scientific classification
- Kingdom: Animalia
- Phylum: Mollusca
- Class: Gastropoda
- Family: Pyramidellidae
- Genus: Turbonilla
- Species: T. nereia

Binomial name
- Turbonilla nereia Dall & Bartsch, 1909

Synonyms
- Turbonilla (Pyrgiscus) nereia Dall & Bartsch, 1909

= Turbonilla nereia =

Species of gastropod

Turbonilla nereia is a species of sea snail, a marine gastropod micromollusk in the family Pyramidellidae, the pyrams and their allies.

== Description ==
The broadly conic shell is pale yellow, with a broad dark wax yellow band, which extends over a little more than one-half the distance from the middle of the whorls to the summit, between the sutures. A secondary of the same color extends from a little posterior to the periphery to the middle of the base. Its length measures 5.8 mm. The 2½ whorls of the protoconch are small and form a depressed helicoid spire, the axis of which is at right angles to that of the succeeding turns, in the first of which they are very slightly immersed. The ten whorls of the teleoconch are flattened in the middle, slightly rounded at the summit and at the periphery. They are ornamented by well rounded, strong, almost vertical axial ribs, which become weakened toward the summit. These ribs are scarcely indicated on the first and second whorls, upon the third and fourth there are 20, upon the remaining (excepting the penultimate whorl which has 20) there are 18. The intercostal spaces are about double as wide as the ribs. They are marked by nine spiral series of pits, all of which pass strongly upon the sides of the ribs, but do not cross their summits. Of these pits, the peripheral one and the three anterior to the one at the summit are stronger than the rest. The space separated by the second and third pit below the summit is a little wider than the rest, and the pits biting in the ribs render these somewhat nodulose at this place. The sutures are well impressed. The periphery of the body whorl is well rounded. The base of the shell is moderately long and well rounded. It is marked by the continuations of the axial ribs which extend feebly to the umbilical region, and about eight weakly incised spiral lines, those nearest the periphery being somewhat interrupted by the ribs. The aperture is suboval. The posterior angle is acute. The outer lip is thin, showing the external markings within. The columella is slender, slightly twisted and very oblique.

== Distribution ==
The type specimen was found in the Pacific Ocean off San Diego, California.
