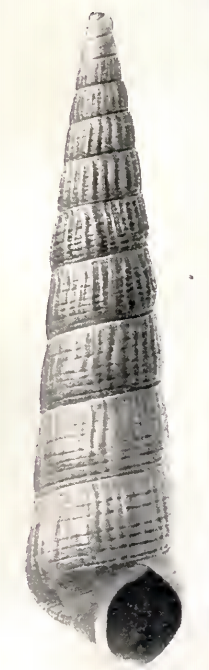
- Drawing of a shell of Turbonilla ista

Scientific classification
- Kingdom: Animalia
- Phylum: Mollusca
- Class: Gastropoda
- Family: Pyramidellidae
- Genus: Turbonilla
- Species: T. ista

Binomial name
- Turbonilla ista Bartsch, 1917

Synonyms
- Turbonilla (Pyrgiscus) ista Bartsch, 1917

= Turbonilla ista =

Species of gastropod

Turbonilla ina is a species of sea snail, a marine gastropod mollusk in the family Pyramidellidae, the pyrams and their allies.

== Description ==
The rather large shell has an elongate conic shape. Its length measures 12.5 mm. Its color is light brown. The early whorls have a light yellow color.. The whorls of the protoconch are decollated. The 11½ whorls of the teleoconch are appressed at the summit, which is slightly excurved. They are marked by rather poorly developed, almost vertical, axial ribs, which become obsolete on the later whorls. Of these ribs, 18 occur upon the second and third, 20 upon the fourth, 22 upon the fifth, 24 upon the sixth, 26 upon the seventh, 28 upon the eighth, 30 upon the ninth, and 32 upon the tenth, while upon the penultimate they are too irregular to be counted. The intercostal spaces are very feebly impressed, about as wide as the ribs. The spiral sculpture consists of strong and weak incised lines, the strong lines pass strongly upon the sides of the ribs and even cross the summit. The first of these strong lines is about one-fifth of the distance between the summit and the suture anterior to the summit, while the spaces between the first and second, the third and fourth, the fourth and fifth, and the fifth and sixth are almost equal and about two-thirds as wide as that between the second and third. Of the finely incised spiral lines eight occur between the summit and the first strong line and three between the first and second, the anterior member of these three being much stronger than the other two. There are also three between the second and third, the last two of these being closer spaced than the first two. No fine lines are apparent between the other strong lines. The suture is slightly constricted. The periphery of the body whorl is strongly inflated. The base of the shell is short, and well rounded. It is marked by the feeble continuations of the axial ribs and 22 wavy incised lines, which are of varying width and spacing. The subquadrate aperture is moderately large. The posterior angle is obtuse. The outer lip is thin, showing the external sculpture within. The inner lip is oblique, straight, and slightly revolute. The parietal wall is glazed with a moderately thick callus.

== Distribution ==
The type specimen was found in the Pacific Ocean off San Diego, California.
