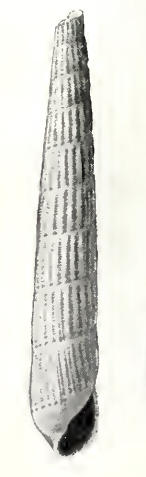
- Drawing of a shell of Turbonilla lazaroensis

Scientific classification
- Kingdom: Animalia
- Phylum: Mollusca
- Class: Gastropoda
- Family: Pyramidellidae
- Genus: Turbonilla
- Species: T. lazaroensis

Binomial name
- Turbonilla lazaroensis Bartsch, 1917

Synonyms
- Turbonilla (Pyrgiscus) lazaroensis Bartsch, 1917

= Turbonilla lazaroensis =

Species of gastropod

Turbonilla lazaroensis is a species of sea snail, a marine gastropod mollusk in the family Pyramidellidae, the pyrams and their allies.

== Description ==
The milk-white shell has an extremely slender, elongate conic shape. The length of the type specimen measures 5.8 mm. The whorls of the protoconch of the type specimen are decollated and the first three whorls of the teleoconch are probably lost. The remaining 9¼ whorls of the teleoconch are flattened. They are situated very high between the sutures, and slightly excurved immediately below the feebly shouldered summit. They are marked by very regular and regularly spaced well-rounded, slightly protractive axial ribs of which 20 occur upon all the remaining turns excepting the last two. Of these the penultimate has 24 and the last 32.

The intercostal spaces are a little narrower than the ribs. They are marked by 17 spiral series of pits of which the first 16 are subequal and subequally spaced. The last, the peripheral pit is a little wider than the rest and separated from the sixteenth by a space about five times as wide as those separating the other pits. The first pit is about as far anterior to the summit as the sixteenth is distant from the seventeenth. The suture is slightly contracted. The periphery of the body whorl is well rounded.

The base of the shell is attenuated marked by the very feeble continuation of the axial ribs and eight wavy incised spiral lines which are of about the same strength but not of equal spacing. A broad band separates the peripheral line of pits from the first basal line. The next three lines are closely and equally spaced, while the fourth is a little farther from the third than that is from the second, and the distance between the fourth and fifth is in equal proportions greater than that between the third and fourth. The rest are again narrowly and about equally spaced. The aperture is elongate oval. The posterior angle is acute. The outer lip is thin showing the external sculpture within by transmitted light. The inner lip is slightly curved reflected and appressed to the attenuated base for almost its entire length. It is provided with a very oblique, strong fold at its insertion. The parietal wall is glazed by a thin callus.

== Distribution ==
The type specimen was found in the Pacific Ocean off Santa Maria Bay, Baja California peninsula.
