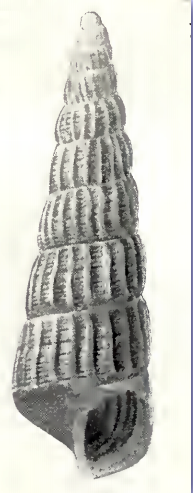
- Drawing of a shell of Turbonilla ina

Scientific classification
- Kingdom: Animalia
- Phylum: Mollusca
- Class: Gastropoda
- Family: Pyramidellidae
- Genus: Turbonilla
- Species: T. ina

Binomial name
- Turbonilla ina Bartsch, 1917

Synonyms
- Turbonilla (Pyrgiscus) ina Bartsch, 1917

= Turbonilla ina =

Species of gastropod

Turbonilla ina is a species of sea snail, a marine gastropod mollusk in the family Pyramidellidae, the pyrams and their allies.

== Description ==
The shell has a broadly, elongate-conic shape. Its length measures 6.1 mm. Its color is bright brown, excepting the protoconch, which is white. The 2½ whorls of the protoconch are planorboid. Their axis is almost at right angles to that of the succeeding turns, in the first of which they are about one-third immersed. The 8½ whorls of the teleoconch are feebly rounded, and appressed at the summit. They are marked by rather feeble, almost vertical, axial ribs, of which 18 occur upon the second and third, 20 upon the fourth and fifth, and 22 upon the remaining whorls. The intercostal spaces are feebly impressed, about as wide as the ribs, crossed by eleven incised spiral lines between the sutures, of these the fifth is the widest, being fully twice as wide as the third and sixth, which are of equal strength. The remaining are much more slender and also of equal strength. In spacing the first is about as far anterior to the summit as the second is distant from the third, or the fourth from the fifth, or the fifth from the sixth, while the space between the first and second, and those between the sixth and the seventh, are about equal. The spiral markings pass up on the sides of the ribs and the stronger ones tend to cross their summit. The suture is moderately constricted. The periphery of the body whorl is decidedly angulated. The base of the shell is short, and slightly rounded. It is marked by the very feeble continuations of the axial ribs, which become evanescent before reaching the middle of the whorls, and thirteen incised spiral lines, which are about equally spaced, the first one below the periphery being a little nearer to its neighbor than the spacing between the rest. The space between the seventh line of the spire and the first incised spiral basal line is a broad, smooth band. The aperture is subquadrate. The posterior angle is obtuse. The outer lip is thin, showing the external sculpture within. The inner lip is almost straight and slightly revolute. The parietal wall is covered with a thin callus.

== Distribution ==
The type specimen has been found in the Pacific Ocean off San Diego, California.
