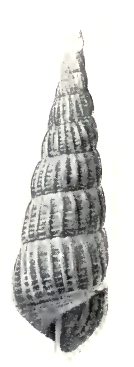
- Drawing of a shell of Turbonilla cortezi

Scientific classification
- Kingdom: Animalia
- Phylum: Mollusca
- Class: Gastropoda
- Family: Pyramidellidae
- Genus: Turbonilla
- Species: T. cortezi

Binomial name
- Turbonilla cortezi Bartsch, 1917

Synonyms
- Turbonilla (Pyrgiscus) cortezi Bartsch, 1917

= Turbonilla cortezi =

Species of gastropod

Turbonilla cortezi is a species of sea snail, a marine gastropod mollusk in the family Pyramidellidae, the pyrams and their allies.

== Description ==
The pale yellowish brown shell is rather large (compared to the other species in this genus) and has an elongate conic shape. Its length measures 6.5 mm. The 2½ whorls of the protoconch are well rounded. They form a decidedly depressed helicoid spire, the axis of which is at right angles to that of the succeeding turns in the first of which the tilted edge is about one-fifth immersed. The teleoconch contains 8¾ whorls. The early whorls are well rounded, the later ones almost flattened. All are appressed at the summit. They are marked by slender, well-rounded, low, decidedly retractive axial ribs, of which 24 occur upon the first four turns, 22 upon the fifth and sixth, 26 upon the penultimate, and 30 upon the last turn. These ribs become somewhat enfeebled and expanded toward the summit. The intercostal spaces are about two times as wide as the ribs. They are crossed by seven spiral series of pits, of which the second, third, sixth, and seventh are equal and stronger than the rest. The other three are about half as wide and equal. In addition to the above sculpture the entire spire is marked by fine incremental lines and equally fine spiral striations, the combinations of which give to the surface a clothlike texture. The suture is feebly impressed. The periphery of the body whorl is well rounded. The base of the shell is moderately long, and strongly rounded. It is marked by incremental lines and 8 rather broad, somewhat wavy, subequal, and subequally spaced spiral lines. The white color of these and the incised stronger lines on the spire stand out in marked contrast to the ground color. The aperture is elongate oval. The slightly effuse anteriorly posterior angle is acute. The outer lip is thin, showing the external sculpture within. The inner lip is almost straight, and slightly revolute. The parietal wall is glazed with a thin callus.

== Distribution ==
The type specimen of this marine species was dredged in shallow water off Santa Maria Bay, Baja California.
