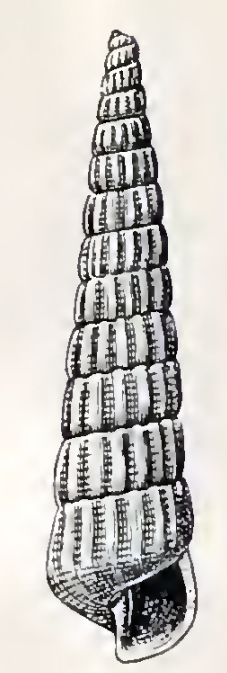
- Drawing of a shell of Turbonilla nuttalli

Scientific classification
- Kingdom: Animalia
- Phylum: Mollusca
- Class: Gastropoda
- Family: Pyramidellidae
- Genus: Turbonilla
- Species: T. nuttalli

Binomial name
- Turbonilla nuttalli Dall & Bartsch, 1909

Synonyms
- Turbonilla (Pyrgiscus) nuttalli Dall & Bartsch, 1909

= Turbonilla nuttalli =

Species of gastropod

Turbonilla nuttalli is a species of sea snail, a marine gastropod mollusk in the family Pyramidellidae, the pyrams and their allies.

This species was named after the English botanist and zoologist Thomas Nuttall (1786-1859).

== Description ==
The shell is large and has an elongate-conic shape. The length of the type specimen measures 9.9 mm (with the protoconch decollated as well as probably the first turn). The shell is yellowish-white, with a light-brown area about the columella. (Nuclear whorls decollated.) The 13 remaining whorls of the teleoconch are well rounded, slightly shouldered at the summit and scarcely at all contracted at the periphery. They are marked by strong, narrow, well rounded, slightly protractive axial ribs, of which 14 occur upon the third, 16 upon the fourth to eighth, and 18 upon the remaining turns. The shallow intercostal spaces are about one and one-half times as wide as the ribs. They are marked by about 30 incised spiral lines which are strongest at the periphery and gradually weaken toward the summit. A moderately broad, plain area on the middle between the sutures is left unmarked. The periphery and the base of the body whorl are well rounded. They are marked by the feeble continuations of the axial ribs and numerous exceedingly fine, closely spaced, wavy, spiral striations. The aperture is small and rhomboidal. The posterior angle is obtuse. The outer lip is thin, showing the external sculpture within. The columella is strong, straight, and revolute.

== Distribution ==
The type specimen is labelled "South America" without further explanation.
