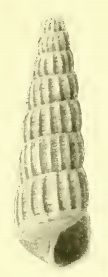
- Drawing of a shell of Turbonilla baegerti

Scientific classification
- Kingdom: Animalia
- Phylum: Mollusca
- Class: Gastropoda
- Family: Pyramidellidae
- Genus: Turbonilla
- Species: T. baegerti

Binomial name
- Turbonilla baegerti Bartsch, 1917

Synonyms
- Turbonilla (Pyrgiscus) baegerti Bartsch, 1917

= Turbonilla baegerti =

Species of gastropod

Turbonilla baegerti is a species of sea snail, a marine gastropod mollusk in the family Pyramidellidae, the pyrams and their allies.

== Description ==
The light yellow horn-colored shell has an elongate conic shape. Its length measures 4.8 millimetres (0.19 in). The 2½ whorls of the protoconch are well rounded. They form a decidedly depressed helicoid spire, the axis of which is at right angles to that of the succeeding whorls, in the first of which the tilted edge of the nucleus is about one-fifth immersed. The nine whorls of the teleoconch are flattened, and slopingly shouldered toward the summit. They are marked by distinctly spaced, well-rounded, very regular, slightly retractively slanting axial ribs of which 18 occur upon the first five and 20 upon the remaining turns. These ribs become decidedly enfeebled and somewhat flattened toward the summit. The intercostal spaces are about twice as wide as the ribs crossed by 12 incised spiral lines of which the first to fourth, and the sixth, ninth, and tenth are mere striations while the fifth, seventh, eighth, eleventh, and twelfth are subequal and much stronger. The widest space is between the tenth and eleventh line, the rest of the spacing is subequal, excepting the first four lines below the summit, which are a little more closely crowded. The suture is strongly constricted. The periphery of the body whorl is well rounded. The base of the shell is short, and well rounded. It is marked by the feeble continuation of the axial ribs which become evanescent before reaching the middle of the base and 16 rather closely crowded finely incised spiral lines, the first of which is considerably anterior to the first series of supraperipheral pits. The large aperture is broadly oval. The posterior angle is obtuse. The outer lip is thin, showing the external sculpture within. The inner lip is stout, slightly curved and somewhat revolute. It is provided with a moderately strong oblique fold a little anterior to its insertion. The parietal is wall covered with a thin callus.

== Distribution ==
The type specimen was collected in shallow water off Santa Maria Bay, Baja California.
