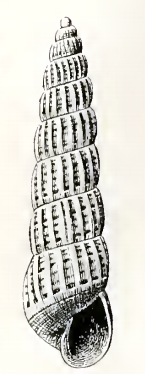
- Drawing of a shell of Turbonilla halidoma

Scientific classification
- Kingdom: Animalia
- Phylum: Mollusca
- Class: Gastropoda
- Family: Pyramidellidae
- Genus: Turbonilla
- Species: T. halidoma

Binomial name
- Turbonilla halidoma Dall & Bartsch, 1909

Synonyms
- Turbonilla (Pyrgiscus) halidoma Dall & Bartsch, 1909

= Turbonilla halidoma =

Species of gastropod

Turbonilla halidoma is a species of sea snail, a marine gastropod mollusk in the family Pyramidellidae, the pyrams and their allies.

== Description ==
The milk-white shell has an elongate-conic shape. Its length measures 6.7 millimetres (0.26 in). The 2 1/4 whorls of the protoconch are small. They form a moderately elevated spire whose axis is at right angles to that of the succeeding turns, in the first of which it is about one-fourth immersed. The nine whorls of the teleoconch are flattened in the middle. They have a sloping shoulder that extends over the posterior fourth between the sutures and renders the whorls slightly angulated at their anterior margin. They are weakly contracted at the suture. They are marked by moderately strong, well rounded, low, retractive axial ribs, of which 24 occur upon the first, 26 upon the second and third, and 24 upon the remaining turns. The intercostal spaces are a little more than double the width of the ribs. They are marked by pits and incised spiral lines. Of these the one at the periphery and the one at the anterior termination of the posterior third between the sutures are of equal width, and much wider than the rest. Two other pits a little less strong divide the space between the two strong pits into three segments, the middle one of which is a trifle wider than the other two which are equal. The three areas are again divided by finer lines, the first above the periphery being crossed by one, the next by three and the third by two fine striations. The space between the summit and the deep series of pits anterior to it is crossed by four incised and wavy, exceedingly fine spiral lines. The periphery of the body whorl is well rounded. It is marked by the feeble extensions of the axial ribs which disappear shortly after crossing it. The base of the shell is well rounded. It is marked by twenty-two well incised subequal and subequally spaced spiral lines. The aperture is oval. The posterior angle is acute. The outer lip is thin, showing the external sculpture within. The columella is slender, twisted and slightly revolute.
