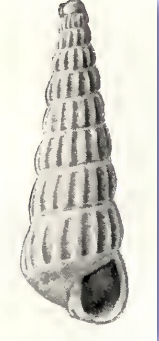
- Drawing of a shell of Turbonilla doredona

Scientific classification
- Kingdom: Animalia
- Phylum: Mollusca
- Class: Gastropoda
- Family: Pyramidellidae
- Genus: Turbonilla
- Species: T. doredona

Binomial name
- Turbonilla doredona Bartsch, 1917

Synonyms
- Turbonilla (Strioturbonilla) doredona Bartsch, 1917

= Turbonilla doredona =

Species of gastropod

Turbonilla doredona is a species of sea snail, a marine gastropod mollusk in the family Pyramidellidae, the pyrams and their allies.

== Description ==
The yellowish white shell has a very regularly, and broadly elongate conic shape. Its length measures 4.2 mm. The 2¾ clear and smooth whorls of the protoconch are strongly rounded. They form a strongly elevated spire having its axis at right angles to that of the succeeding turns, in the first of which the side of the last revolution is about one-fifth immersed. The eight whorl of the teleoconch are well rounded. They are slightly curved at the appressed summit. They are marked by rather distantly spaced, slender, narrow, well-rounded axial ribs, which become somewhat flattened and enfeebled toward the summit. Of these ribs 18 occur upon the first, 16 upon the second to fourth, and 18 upon the remaining turns. Intercostal spaces about two and one-half times as wide as the ribs, terminating at little posterior to the suture, thus leaving a very narrow plain band between their termination and the summit of the succeeding turn. The sutures are moderately constricted. The periphery of the body whorl of the adolescent specimen is well rounded. The base of the shell is short, and strongly rounded. It is marked by the feeble continuations of the axial ribs, which become evanescent before reaching the middle of the base. It is quite possible that when adult specimens are obtained it will be found that the axial ribs terminate at the periphery instead of continuing feebly upon the base. The entire surface of the shell crossed by rather marked, subequally strong and subequally spaced deeply incised spiral striations. The aperture is subquadrate. The posterior angle is obtuse. The outer lip is partly fractured. The inner lip is thick, almost straight, and somewhat revolute. It is provided with an obsolete oblique fold a little anterior to its insertion. The parietal wall is glazed by a fine callus.

== Distribution ==
The type specimen was found off Magdalena Bay, Baja California.
