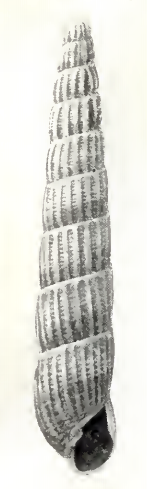
- Drawing of a shell of Turbonilla mariana

Scientific classification
- Kingdom: Animalia
- Phylum: Mollusca
- Class: Gastropoda
- Family: Pyramidellidae
- Genus: Turbonilla
- Species: T. mariana

Binomial name
- Turbonilla mariana Bartsch, 1917

Synonyms
- Turbonilla (Pyrgiscus) mariana Bartsch, 1917

= Turbonilla mariana =

Species of gastropod

Turbonilla mariana is a species of sea snail, a marine gastropod mollusk in the family Pyramidellidae, the pyrams and their allies.

== Description ==
The very slender shell has an elongate conic shape. The length of the type specimen measures 5.9 mm. Its color is light horn yellow with the anterior half of the base and a narrow, pale brown band about one-fifth of the width of the space between the sutures. The band is situated about its own width posterior to the periphery. The whorls of the protoconch of the type specimen are decollated and probably the first two whorls of the teleoconch are missing. The remaining 9½ whorls of the teleoconch are flattened very high between the sutures, and narrowly shouldered at the summit. They are marked by closely crowded, quite regular, well rounded, almost straight, slightly protractive axial ribs;18 ribs occur upon the first four of the remaining turns; 20 upon the fifth to seventh; 22 upon the eighth, and 26 upon the penultimate whorl. The intercostal spaces are a little narrower than the ribs. They are marked by 13 strongly incised, subequal and subequally spaced pits. The suture is moderately constricted. The periphery of the body whorl is well rounded. The base of the shell attenuated, and well rounded. It is marked by the feeble continuation of the ribs which reach to the umbilical chink and five equal and equally spaced, moderately broad, shallow, incised lines of a rust brown color. The aperture is elongate oval. The posterior angle is acute. The outer lip is thin, showing the external sculpture within. The inner lip is slender, moderately curved, reflected over and adnate to the attenuated base for two-thirds of its length. It is and provided with a strong oblique fold at its insertion. The parietal wall is covered by a thick callus.

== Distribution ==
The type specimen was found in the pacific Ocean off Santa Maria Bay, Baja California peninsula.
