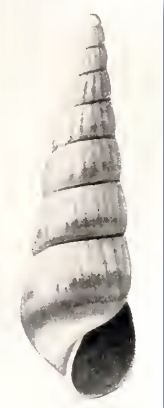
- Drawing of a shell of Turbonilla franciscana

Scientific classification
- Kingdom: Animalia
- Phylum: Mollusca
- Class: Gastropoda
- Family: Pyramidellidae
- Genus: Turbonilla
- Species: T. franciscana

Binomial name
- Turbonilla franciscana Bartsch, 1917

Synonyms
- Turbonilla (Pyrgolampros) franciscana Bartsch, 1917

= Turbonilla franciscana =

Species of gastropod

Turbonilla franciscana is a species of sea snail, a marine gastropod mollusk in the family Pyramidellidae, the pyrams and their allies.

== Description ==
The shell has an elongate conic shape. Its length measures 6.8 mm. The shell is flesh colored, excepting a broad chestnut band which covers the median third of the last whorl. This dark band really consists of two chestnut-colored zones, the anterior of which embraces half of the band while the posterior is equal to one-fourth of the width of the dark area. The two zones are separated by a zone of a little lighter shade which is as wide as the posterior zone. The whorls of the protoconch are decollated in all the specimens seen. The 8 or 9 whorls of the teleoconch are situated rather high between the sutures, feebly shouldered at the summit, and slightly constricted at the periphery. The early whorls of the teleoconch are marked by low, rounded, broad, almost vertical axial ribs which are wider than the shallow impressed spaces that separate them. On the later whorls the axial ribs become quite obsolete. On the first of the whorls of the teleoconch there are eighteen of these ribs; on the second to fourth, twenty; on the fifth they become decidedly feeble; and on the remainder they are not at all differentiated. In addition to the axial sculpture the surface of the shell is marked by very fine, wavy, closely spaced spiral striations. The periphery of the body whorl is well rounded. The base of the shell is moderately long, and well rounded. It is marked by lines of growth and spiral striations comparable to those on the spire. The aperture is broadly oval. The outer lip is thin, showing the color markings within. The columella is curved, somewhat twisted, and slightly revolute. The parietal wall is glazed with a thin callus.

== Distribution ==
The type specimen of this marine species was found on fine sand and mud bottom off San Francisco Bay, California.
