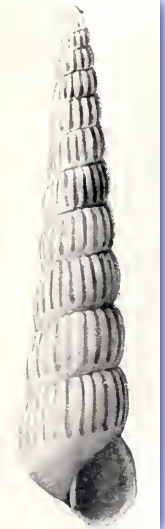
- Drawing of a shell of Turbonilla barkleyensis

Scientific classification
- Kingdom: Animalia
- Phylum: Mollusca
- Class: Gastropoda
- Family: Pyramidellidae
- Genus: Turbonilla
- Species: T. barkleyensis

Binomial name
- Turbonilla barkleyensis Bartsch, 1917

Synonyms
- Turbonilla (Strioturbonilla) barkleyensis Bartsch, 1917

= Turbonilla barkleyensis =

Species of gastropod

Turbonilla barkleyensis is a species of sea snail, a marine gastropod mollusk in the family Pyramidellidae, the pyrams and their allies.

== Description ==
The large, bluish-white shell is slender and has an elongate conic shape. Its length measures 9.2 mm. The 2¼ whorls of the protoconch are small, and depressed helicoid. Their axis is at right angles to that of the succeeding turn, in the first of which they are slightly immersed. The 12 whorls of the teleoconch are well rounded, and appressed at the summit. They are marked by slender, curved, moderately regular, slightly protractive, axial ribs, of which 16 occur upon the first to fifth, 18 upon the sixth, 22 upon the seventh and eighth, 24 upon the ninth and tenth, and 26 upon the penultimate turn. The intercostal spaces are moderately impressed, terminating a little posterior to the periphery of the whorls. The summit of the succeeding turns falls a little anterior to the termination of the intercostal pits and leaves a smooth band in the suture. The sutures are moderately constricted. The periphery of the body whorl is obtusely angulated. The base of the shell is moderately long, and weakly rounded. The entire surface of the shell is marked by microscopic striations. The aperture is large, broad, subquadrate, and somewhat effuse at the junction of the basal and the outer lip. The posterior angle is obtuse. The outer lip is very thin, showing the external sculpture within. The inner lip is decidedly oblique, slightly curved and somewhat revolute. The parietal wall is covered by a thin callus.

== Distribution ==
This species occurs in the Pacific Ocean off Vancouver Island, Canada.
