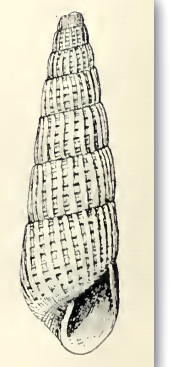
- Drawing of a shell of Turbonilla adusta

Scientific classification
- Kingdom: Animalia
- Phylum: Mollusca
- Class: Gastropoda
- Family: Pyramidellidae
- Genus: Turbonilla
- Species: T. adusta

Binomial name
- Turbonilla adusta Dall & Bartsch, 1909

Synonyms
- Turbonilla (Pyrgiscus) adusta Dall & Bartsch, 1909

= Turbonilla adusta =

Species of gastropod

Turbonilla adusta is a species of sea snail, a marine gastropod mollusk in the family Pyramidellidae, the pyrams and their allies.

== Description ==
The apel brown shell has a robust appearance. The length of the shell measures just over 6 mm. (The whorls of the protoconch are decollated). The nine whorls of the teleoconch are flattened, slightly exerted at the summit, where they are moderately squarely shouldered. They are marked by well developed, rounded, slightly retractive, axial ribs, of which 20 occur upon the second and third, 22 upon the fourth and fifth, 24 upon the sixth of the remaining turns, and 28 upon the penultimate whorl. The intercostal spaces equal the ribs. They are crossed by a double series of spiral pits, five are strong and of equal strength, one of which is at the periphery, the other a little posterior to it, the third occupies the middle of the space between the sutures, while the other two divide the space posterior to this into three equal areas. The fine lines are arranged in the following manner: between the second and third supra-peripheral pit, two fine lines; between the third and fourth, one; between the fourth and fifth, one; between the fifth and summit, two. The sutures are well impressed, and rendered sinuous by the ribs. The periphery of the body whorl is marked by a broad band, that is crossed by the extensions of the axial ribs, which continue feebly over the well-rounded base to the umbilical area. In addition to these ribs, the base of the shell is marked by eleven incised spiral lines, the three immediately below the periphery being somewhat interrupted, the remaining are equal and equally spaced. The aperture is ovate. The posterior angle is acute. The columella is slender, somewhat curved and reflected.
