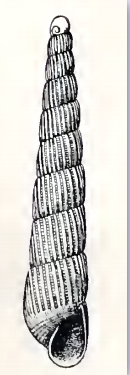
- Drawing of a shell of Turbonilla macbridei

Scientific classification
- Kingdom: Animalia
- Phylum: Mollusca
- Class: Gastropoda
- Family: Pyramidellidae
- Genus: Turbonilla
- Species: T. macbridei

Binomial name
- Turbonilla macbridei Dall & Bartsch, 1909

Synonyms
- Turbonilla (Pyrgiscus) macbridei Dall & Bartsch, 1909

= Turbonilla macbridei =

Species of gastropod

Turbonilla macbridei is a species of sea snail, a marine gastropod mollusk in the family Pyramidellidae, the pyrams and their allies.

This species was named for Prof. Thomas H. Macbride.

== Description ==
The shell has an exceedingly slender shape. Its length measures 4 mm. Its color is light yellow, with a broader darker yellow band immediately below the summit and another halfway between this and the suture. The 1¾ whorls of the protoconch are large. They form a depressed helicoid spire. Its axis is at right angles to that of the succeeding turns, on the first of which it rests, but is not immersed. The nine whorls of the teleoconch are situated exceedingly high between the sutures, and moderately rounded. They are marked by slender, very regular, slightly curved, well rounded, somewhat retractive axial ribs, of which 24 occur upon the first, 22 upon the second and third, 24 upon the fourth and fifth, 26 upon the sixth and seventh, and about 32 upon the penultimate whorl. The intercostal spaces are about as wide as the ribs, and well impressed. They are marked by fifteen equal and equally spaced spiral series of pits, which owing to the narrowness of the intercostal spaces, appear as mere punctations. The sutures are well marked. The periphery of the body whorl is without spiral sculpture. The base of the shell is moderately long. It is marked by the continuations of the axial ribs, and six equal and equally spaced spiral striations on its anterior two-thirds. The aperture is oval. The posterior angle is acute. The outer lip is thin, showing the external sculpture within. The columella is slender, decidedly flexuose, and very slightly revolute.

== Distribution ==
The type specimen was found in the Pacific Ocean off La Paz, Baja California
