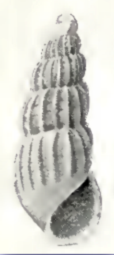
- Drawing of a shell of Turbonilla guilleni

Scientific classification
- Kingdom: Animalia
- Phylum: Mollusca
- Class: Gastropoda
- Family: Pyramidellidae
- Genus: Turbonilla
- Species: T. guilleni

Binomial name
- Turbonilla guilleni Bartsch, 1917

Synonyms
- Turbonilla (Pyrgisculus) guilleni Bartsch, 1917

= Turbonilla guilleni =

Species of gastropod

Turbonilla guilleni is a species of sea snail, a marine gastropod mollusk in the family Pyramidellidae, the pyrams and their allies.

== Description ==
The milk-white shell has a conic shape. Its length measures 3 mm. The 2½ whorls of the protoconch are well rounded. They form a depressed helicoid spire, the axis of which is at right angles to that of the succeeding turns, in the first of which it is about one-third immersed. The five whorls of the teleoconch are somewhat inflated, well rounded, and almost appressed at the summit. They are marked on each whorl by 18 narrow, well developed, rounded, almost vertical axial ribs. Some of these ribs are developed into varices and these are distributed at irregular intervals. The intercostal spaces are about 2½ times as wide as the ribs. They are crossed by three spiral series of strong pits, of which one is at the periphery, the second a little anterior to the middle and the third about two-fifths of the space between this and the summit posterior to the median pit. In addition to these pits the intercostal spaces are crossed by many almost equally strong incised spiral lines of which 12 occur between the summit and the first pit, 7 between the first and median pit, and 8 between the median and peripheral pit. The suture is quite strongly constricted. The periphery of the body whorl is well rounded. The base of the shell is moderately long, and attenuated. It is marked by the feeble continuations of the axial ribs and numerous incised spiral lines of a little wider spacing than the fine sculpture on the spire. The oval aperture is rissoid. The posterior angle is obtuse. The outer lip is thick. The inner lip is short, curved, reflected over and appressed to the base. The parietal wall is covered with a thick callus.

== Distribution ==
The type specimen was found in shallow water of the Pacific Ocean off Santa Maria Bay, Baja California.
