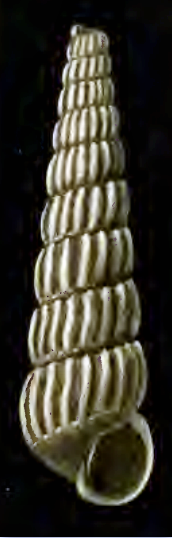
- Drawing of a shell of Turbonilla abseida

Scientific classification
- Kingdom: Animalia
- Phylum: Mollusca
- Class: Gastropoda
- Family: Pyramidellidae
- Genus: Turbonilla
- Species: T. abseida

Binomial name
- Turbonilla abseida Dall & Bartsch, 1906

Synonyms
- Turbonilla (Chemnitzia) abseida Dall & Bartsch, 1906

= Turbonilla abseida =

Species of gastropod

Turbonilla abseida is a species of sea snail, a marine gastropod mollusk in the family Pyramidellidae, the pyrams and their allies.

== Description ==
The large, milk-white, shining shell has an elongate-conic shape. The length of the shell measures 8.4 mm. The whorls of the protoconch are decollated. The 12 whorls of the teleoconch are decidedly rounded, slightly shouldered and somewhat constricted at the periphery. They are marked by very strong, lamellar oblique axial ribs and deeply impressed intercostal spaces which are about twice as wide as the ribs. The ribs do not fuse at the summit but terminate strongly as cusps, rendering the outline of the summits wavy. They fuse at the periphery and there suddenly terminate the deep intercostal spaces. The type, which has lost the nucleus and perhaps the first three post-nuclear whorls, has fourteen ribs on the first (remaining), sixteen on the fifth, and twenty-two on the penultimate whorl. The summits of succeeding whorls on the later volutions drop a little anterior to the periphery and permit a narrow plain band to appear above the suture. The periphery of the body whorl is slightly angulated. The base of the shell is short, and well rounded. The aperture is moderately large, and subquadrate. The posterior is angle obtuse. The outer lip is thin, showing the external sculpture within by transmitted light. The columella is oblique, revolute, and with a weak oblique fold at its insertion.

== Distribution ==
This species occurs in the Pacific Ocean off Japan.
