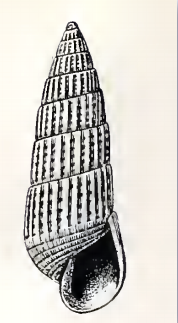
- Drawing of a shell of Turbonilla jewetti

Scientific classification
- Kingdom: Animalia
- Phylum: Mollusca
- Class: Gastropoda
- Family: Pyramidellidae
- Genus: Turbonilla
- Species: T. jewetti

Binomial name
- Turbonilla jewetti Dall & Bartsch, 1909

Synonyms
- Turbonilla (Pyrgiscus) jewetti Dall & Bartsch, 1909

= Turbonilla jewetti =

Species of gastropod

Turbonilla jewetti is a species of sea snail, a marine gastropod mollusk in the family Pyramidellidae, the pyrams and their allies.

== Description ==
The shell is short, and robust. Its length measures 5.5 mm. It is rose pink, but wax yellow at tip. The 2½ whorls of the protoconch are very small, low, and helicoid. Their axis is at right angles to that of the succeeding turns, in the first of which they are about one-third immersed. The eight whorls of the teleoconch are flattened, and shouldered at the summit. They are marked by strong, rounded, slightly protractive axial ribs; of which 18 occur upon the second, 20 upon the third, 22 upon the fourth and fifth, 24 upon the sixth, and 26 upon the penultimate turn. The intercostal spaces are about equal to the ribs, and strongly impressed. They are marked by five series of equal and equally spaced spiral pits, the first of which is at the periphery, the last a little farther from the summit than its neighbor. The sutures are strongly marked, and rendered sinuous by the ribs. The periphery of the body whorl is rounded. It is marked by the feeble continuations of the axial ribs. The base of the shell is moderately long, and well rounded. It is marked by eight unequal and unequally spaced spiral striations, the two immediately below the periphery being stronger than the rest and somewhat interrupted. The aperture is oval. The outer lip is thick within. The columella is stout, somewhat twisted and slightly revolute.

== Distribution ==
The type specimen was found in the Pacific Ocean off San Diego, California.
