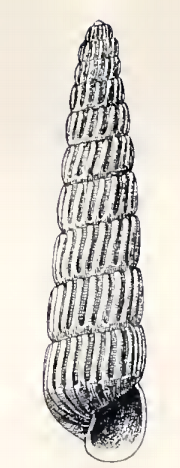
- Drawing of a shell of Turbonilla nicholsi

Scientific classification
- Kingdom: Animalia
- Phylum: Mollusca
- Class: Gastropoda
- Family: Pyramidellidae
- Genus: Turbonilla
- Species: T. nicholsi

Binomial name
- Turbonilla nicholsi Dall & Bartsch, 1909

Synonyms
- Turbonilla (Strioturbonilla) nicholsi Dall & Bartsch, 1909

= Turbonilla nicholsi =

Species of gastropod

Turbonilla nicholsi is a species of sea snail, a marine gastropod mollusk in the family Pyramidellidae, the pyrams and their allies.

This species was named after Lieutenant Nichols who collected the type specimen.

== Description ==
The milk-white shell is large and robust. Its length (protoconch missing) measures 8.8 mm. The whorls of the protoconch are decollated in the type specimen. The twelve whorls of the teleoconch are well rounded and slightly shouldered at the summit. They are marked by strong, somewhat sinuous, decidedly protractive axial ribs, of which 14 occur upon the first, 16 upon the second to sixth, 18 upon the seventh, 20 upon the eighth, 22 upon the ninth, and 25 upon the penultimate turn. The intercostal spaces are almost as wide as the ribs. They are well impressed, and terminate a little distance posterior to the suture. The sutures are strongly marked. The periphery and the rather long base of the body whorl are well rounded. They are marked by the feeble continuations of the axial ribs. The entire surface of the base and the spire are marked by numerous, strongly incised spiral striations, of which those on the spire somewhat exceed the ones on the base in strength. The oval aperture is large. The outer lip is thin, showing the external sculpture within. The columella is slender, sigmoid, and slightly reflected.

== Distribution ==
The type specimen of this marine species was found in the Gulf of California.
