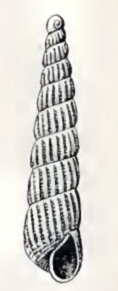
- Drawing of a shell of Turbonilla histias

Scientific classification
- Kingdom: Animalia
- Phylum: Mollusca
- Class: Gastropoda
- Family: Pyramidellidae
- Genus: Turbonilla
- Species: T. histias

Binomial name
- Turbonilla histias Dall & Bartsch, 1909

Synonyms
- Turbonilla (Pyrgiscus) histias Dall & Bartsch, 1909

= Turbonilla histias =

Species of gastropod

Turbonilla histias is a species of sea snail, a marine gastropod mollusk in the family Pyramidellidae, the pyrams and their allies.

== Description ==
The slender shell has an elongate-conic shape. Its posterior half between the sutures is light yellow; the anterior half of the base is chestnut. The length of the shell measures 4.8 mm. The two whorls of the protoconch form a depressed, helicoid spire. Its axis is at right angles to that of the succeeding turns, upon the first of which it rests. The ten whorls of the teleoconch are slightly overhanging, flattened in the middle, very slightly shouldered at the summit, and quite strongly contracted at the suture. They are marked by strong, somewhat sinuous, narrow, retractive axial ribs, of which 18 occur upon all but the penultimate turn, which has 24. The intercostal spaces are about two times as wide as the ribs upon all but the last turn, upon which they are a little narrower. They are marked by eight equal and equally spaced spiral series of pits on all but the last two whorls; on these the third and fourth posterior to the periphery split into finer lines. The sutures are well impressed. The periphery and the base of the body whorl are well rounded. They are marked by the axial ribs which extend undiminished to the umbilical area, and twelve incised spiral lines, of which those immediately below the periphery are the stronger. The aperture is oval. The posterior angle is acute. The outer lip is thin, showing the external sculpture within. The columella is slender, slightly twisted, decidedly curved, and somewhat revolute. The parietal wall is covered with a strong callus.

== Distribution ==
The type specimen occurs off La Paz at the Gulf of California.
