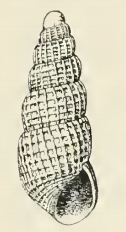
- Drawing of a shell of Turbonilla andrewsi

Scientific classification
- Kingdom: Animalia
- Phylum: Mollusca
- Class: Gastropoda
- Family: Pyramidellidae
- Genus: Turbonilla
- Species: T. andrewsi

Binomial name
- Turbonilla andrewsi Dall & Bartsch, 1909

Synonyms
- Turbonilla (Dunkeria) andrewsi Dall & Bartsch, 1909

= Turbonilla andrewsi =

Species of gastropod

Turbonilla andrewsi is a species of sea snail, a marine gastropod mollusk in the family Pyramidellidae, the pyrams and their allies.

== Description ==
The small shell has a conic shape. Its color is light chestnut, with the umbilical area white. Its length is 2.9 mm. The 2½ whorls of the protoconch form a depressed helicoid spire, whose axis is at right angles to that of the succeeding turns, in the first of which it is about one-third immersed. The six whorls of the teleoconch are well rounded, and moderately contracted at the suture, with a sloping shoulder which extends over the posterior third between the sutures. Th whorls are marked by slender, well-rounded, slightly retractive axial ribs, of which 18 occur upon the first, 20 upon the second and third, 22 upon the fourth, and 32 upon the penultimate turn. The intercostal spaces are about one and one-half times as wide as the ribs upon all but the last whorl. They are marked by five spiral series of broad pits, which are wide as the five cord-like interspaces which they bound and which render the ribs somewhat tuberculate at their junction. The sutures are well impressed. The periphery and the base of the body whorl are well rounded, the latter marked by the continuation of the axial ribs, which extend feebly to the umbilical area, and six spiral cords which grow successively a little narrower from the periphery to the umbilical area. The aperture is oval. The posterior angle is acute. The outer lip is thin, showing the external sculpture within. The columella is rather thick, reinforced by the base. The parietal wall is covered by a thin callus.

== Distribution ==
This species occurs in the Pacific Ocean off Panama.
