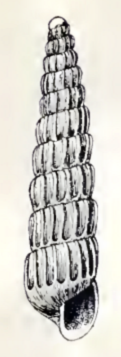
- Drawing of a shell of Turbonilla calvini

Scientific classification
- Kingdom: Animalia
- Phylum: Mollusca
- Class: Gastropoda
- Family: Pyramidellidae
- Genus: Turbonilla
- Species: T. calvini

Binomial name
- Turbonilla calvini Dall & Bartsch, 1909

Synonyms
- Turbonilla (Strioturbonilla) calvini Dall & Bartsch, 1909

= Turbonilla calvini =

Species of gastropod

Turbonilla calvini is a species of sea snail, a marine gastropod mollusk in the family Pyramidellidae, the pyrams and their allies.

The species is named for Prof. Samuel Calvin.

== Description ==
The milk-white shell has an elongate-conic shape. The length of the shell measures 3.6 mm. The 2¾ whorls of the protoconch form a decidedly elevated helicoid spire, the axis of which is at right angles to that of the succeeding turns, in the first of which they are about one-fourth immersed. A complete shell would probably have twelve whorls in the teleoconch. The early whorls of the teleoconch are strongly rounded, decidedly shouldered at the summit, and constricted at the sutures. Later ones are flattened in the middle, less shouldered and less contracted. The axial ribs are strong, sublamellar, and shouldered a little below the summit. There are 14 upon the first to ninth, 16 upon the tenth, and 18 upon the penultimate turn. The intercostal spaces are about two and one-half times as wide as the ribs. They are well impressed, a little more so on the shoulder than on the summit, which gives them contracted appearance at this place, terminating a little above the suture. The sutures are well impressed. The entire surface of the base of the shell and the spire is marked by fine, wavy, spiral striations. The periphery and the moderately long base of the body whorl are well rounded. The aperture is rhomboidal. The outer lip is thin, showing the external sculpture within. The columella is moderately strong, and slightly curved.

== Distribution ==
The type specimen was found in the Pacific Ocean off La Paz, Baja California.
