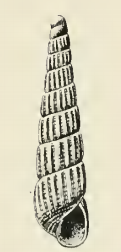
- Drawing of a shell of Turbonilla lara

Scientific classification
- Kingdom: Animalia
- Phylum: Mollusca
- Class: Gastropoda
- Family: Pyramidellidae
- Genus: Turbonilla
- Species: T. lara

Binomial name
- Turbonilla lara Dall & Bartsch, 1909

Synonyms
- Turbonilla (Pyrgiscus) lara Dall & Bartsch, 1909

= Turbonilla lara =

Species of gastropod

Turbonilla lara is a species of sea snail, a marine gastropod mollusk in the family Pyramidellidae, the pyrams and their allies.

== Description ==
The milk-white shell is small and slender. Its length measures 4.3 mm. The 2¼ whorls of the protoconch form a depressed, helicoid spire. Its axis is at right angles to that of the succeeding turns, in the first of which it is very slightly immersed. The nine whorls of the teleoconch are flattened in the middle, rounding slightly toward the moderately shouldered summit, and becoming somewhat contracted at the suture. They are marked by fairly strong, straight, slightly retractive axial ribs, of which 18 occur upon the first and second and 20 upon all the remaining whorls excepting the penultimate turn, which has 22, The intercostal spaces vary from one and one-half to two times the width of the ribs. They are marked by nine series of spiral pits, of which the peripheral and the fifth above the periphery are the widest; the third and fourth above the periphery and the two immediately below the summit, are a little narrower than the rest. The segments left between the pits form almost equal raised cords. The sutures well marked. The periphery of the body whorl and the base of the shell are moderately well rounded. They are ornamented by the continuations of the axial ribs and three strong, interrupted lines of pits on the posterior half and five slender lines on the anterior. The aperture is oval. The posterior angle is acute. The outer lip is thin, showing the external sculpture within. The columella is slender, curved, and slightly revolute. The parietal wall is covered by a thin callus.

== Distribution ==
The type specimen occurs off La Paz at the Gulf of California.
