= Turbonilla gloriosa =

Scientific classification
- Kingdom: Animalia
- Phylum: Mollusca
- Class: Gastropoda
- Family: Pyramidellidae
- Genus: Turbonilla
- Species: T. gloriosa

Binomial name
- Turbonilla gloriosa Bartsch, 1912

Synonyms
- Turbonilla (Pyrgolampros) gloriosa Bartsch, 1912

Species of gastropod

Turbonilla gloriosa is a species of sea snail, a marine gastropod mollusk in the family Pyramidellidae, the pyrams and their allies.

== Description ==
The very slender shell has an elongate-conic shape. Its length measures 8.3 mm. Its color is wax-yellow with a broad, brown band that on the early and the later whorls extends over the anterior half, between the sutures, while on the middle whorls it covers fully two-thirds of that space. The whorls of the protoconch are decollated. The type specimen has probably also lost the first whorl of the teleoconch. The eleven remaining whorls are flattened in the middle, rounding moderately toward the summit and the periphery. They are marked by strong, regular, retractive axial ribs, of which occur on the second of the remaining turns, 16 upon the third, 18 upon the fourth to sixth, 20 upon the seventh and eighth, while upon the remaining volutions they become much enfeebled and less regular. These upon the middle whorls are strongest in the middle, sloping gently toward the summit and the periphery, the slope at the summit lending them a shouldered effect. The intercostal spaces are deeply impressed, about as wide as the ribs. The sutures are strongly impressed. The periphery of the body whorl is somewhat inflated and well rounded. The base of the shell is moderately long and well rounded. It is marked by feeble continuations of the axial ribs. The entire surface of the spire and the base is crossed by numerous, very fine, spiral striations. The aperture is subquadrate. The posterior angle is obtuse. The outer lip is thin, showing the banding of the exterior within. The inner lip is very oblique, slightly curved, and revolute, with an obscure fold at its insertion. The parietal wall is glazed with a very thin callus.

== Distribution ==
This species occurs in the Pacific Ocean off San Diego, California.
