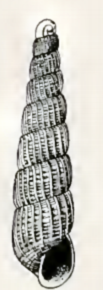
- Drawing of a shell of Turbonilla marshalli

Scientific classification
- Kingdom: Animalia
- Phylum: Mollusca
- Class: Gastropoda
- Family: Pyramidellidae
- Genus: Turbonilla
- Species: T. marshalli

Binomial name
- Turbonilla marshalli Dall & Bartsch, 1909

Synonyms
- Turbonilla (Pyrgiscus) marshalli Dall & Bartsch, 1909

= Turbonilla marshalli =

Species of gastropod

Turbonilla marshalli is a species of sea snail, a marine gastropod mollusk in the family Pyramidellidae, the pyrams and their allies.

== Description ==
The shell is very small and slender. Its length measures 3.6 mm. It has a light yellow color, with a darker band immediately posterior to the periphery, and another slender one about halfway between the middle of the space between the sutures and the summit. The 2½ whorls of the protoconch are depressed and helicoid. Their axis is at right angles to that of the succeeding turns, in the first of which they are about one-fifth immersed. The eight whorls of the teleoconch are situated high between the sutures. They are flattened in the middle, gently rounded at the periphery and the summit. They are marked by slender, retractive axial ribs, of which 22 occur upon the first and second, 24 upon the third to fifth, 26 upon the sixth, and 24 upon the penultimate turn. The intercostal spaces are a little wider than the ribs. They are moderately well impressed. They are marked by seven strong subequal series of pits between the periphery and the subsutural color band, and three fine incised lines posterior to this. The periphery of body whorl is well rounded. The base of the shell is moderately long. It is marked by the feeble continuations of the axial ribs and five subequal, equally spaced spiral striations. The aperture is ovoid. The posterior angle is acute. The outer lip is thin, showing the external sculpture within. The columella is very oblique, curved, twisted, and slightly revolute.

== Distribution ==
The type specimen was found in the Pacific Ocean off La Paz, Baja California peninsula.
