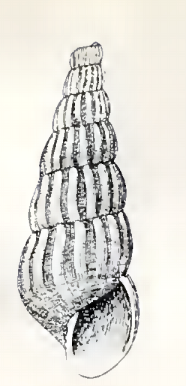
- Drawing of a shell of Turbonilla newcombei

Scientific classification
- Kingdom: Animalia
- Phylum: Mollusca
- Class: Gastropoda
- Family: Pyramidellidae
- Genus: Turbonilla
- Species: T. newcombei

Binomial name
- Turbonilla newcombei Dall & Bartsch, 1907

Synonyms
- Turbonilla (Pyrgolampros) newcombei Dall & Bartsch, 1907

= Turbonilla newcombei =

Species of gastropod

Turbonilla newcombei is a species of sea snail, a marine gastropod mollusk in the family Pyramidellidae, the pyrams and their allies.

== Description ==
The shell has a regularly, broadly conic shape. Its length measures 5.4 mm. It is white on the posterior half and light brown on the anterior half of the exposed portion of the whorl. The base of the shell is white. The whorls of the protoconch are decollated in all the studied specimens. The seven whorls of the teleoconch are somewhat overhanging. They are decidedly contracted toward the periphery from the anterior fifth of the exposed part. They are almost flattened posterior to this. They are closely appressed at the summit, and separated by strongly marked sutures. There are about 18 ribs upon all the turns. These ribs are almost vertical, moderately elevated, rounded in the middle, decidedly flattened and widened at the summit, disappearing at the periphery. The intercostal spaces are not depressed below the general surface. They are a little wider than the ribs. The periphery and the moderately long base of the shell are well rounded, smooth, excepting the fine spiral striation which covers the entire surface of the shell. The aperture is subquadrate. The posterior angle is acute. The outer lip is thin, showing the color bands within. The columella is slender, oblique, and slightly revolute.

== Distribution ==
The type specimen was found in the Pacific Ocean off Vancouver Island, British Columbia.
