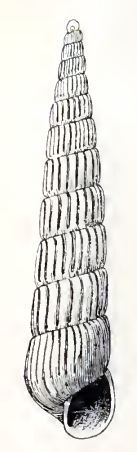
- Drawing of a shell of Turbonilla attrita

Scientific classification
- Kingdom: Animalia
- Phylum: Mollusca
- Class: Gastropoda
- Family: Pyramidellidae
- Genus: Turbonilla
- Species: T. attrita

Binomial name
- Turbonilla attrita Dall & Bartsch, 1909

Synonyms
- Turbonilla (Strioturbonilla) attrita Dall & Bartsch, 1909

= Turbonilla attrita =

Species of gastropod

Turbonilla attrita is a species of sea snail, a marine gastropod mollusk in the family Pyramidellidae, the pyrams and their allies.

== Description ==
The bluish-white, slender shell has an elongate-conic shape. Its length measures 7.4 mm. The 2½ whorls of the protoconch are small and helicoid. Their axis is at right angles to that of the succeeding turns, in the first of which they are slightly immersed. The 12 whorls of the teleoconch are situated very high between the sutures and almost flattened. They are ornamented with very low, flattened, somewhat irregular, protractive axial ribs, which are best developed on the early whorls. Of these there are 18 upon the second whorl, 22 upon the third, 18 upon the fourth and fifth, 22 upon the sixth, 18 upon the seventh, 20 upon the eight and ninth. On the next turn they become quite enfeebled, and on the penultimate turn they are obsolete. The intercostal spaces are about half as wide as the ribs and very shallow. The sutures are well impressed. The periphery of the body whorl is well rounded. The base of the shell is short and somewhat inflated. The entire surface of the spire and the base is marked by numerous very fine, waxy spiral striations. The aperture is broadly oval. The posterior angle is acute. The outer lip is thin. The short columella is slender, somewhat curved and slightly reflected.

== Distribution ==
This species occurs in the Pacific Ocean off California.
