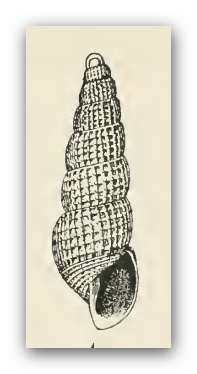
- Drawing of a shell of Turbonilla excolpa

Scientific classification
- Kingdom: Animalia
- Phylum: Mollusca
- Class: Gastropoda
- Family: Pyramidellidae
- Genus: Turbonilla
- Species: T. excolpa

Binomial name
- Turbonilla excolpa Dall & Bartsch, 1909

Synonyms
- Turbonilla (Dunkeria) excolpa Dall & Bartsch, 1909

= Turbonilla excolpa =

Species of gastropod

Turbonilla excolpa is a species of sea snail, a marine gastropod mollusk in the family Pyramidellidae, the pyrams and their allies.

== Description ==
The color of the shell is wax yellow on the early whorls, ranging to chestnut brown on the last. Its length measures 3.7 mm. The 2½ whorls of the protoconch form a depressed helicoid spire, whose axis is at right angles to that of the succeeding turns, in the first of which it is about one-third immersed. The seven whorls of the teleoconch are well rounded. They are marked by well-developed, narrow, rounded, almost vertical axial ribs, of which 24 occur upon the first to third, 26 upon the fourth, 28 upon the fifth, and about 36 upon the penultimate turn. The intercostal spaces are about as wide as the ribs, crossed by five series of spiral pits which are as wide as the five raised spaces which they separate. The junction of these raised cords with the ribs renders them nodulous. The sutures are constricted. The periphery of the body whorl and the base of the shell are well rounded, the latter marked by seven spiral cords. The aperture is oval. The posterior angle is acute. The outer lip is thin, showing the external sculpture within. The columella is slender, somewhat twisted, and reinforced by the base.

== Distribution ==
The type specimen was found in the Gulf of California.
