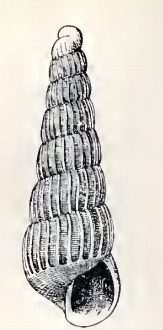
- Drawing of a shell of Turbonilla imperialis

Scientific classification
- Kingdom: Animalia
- Phylum: Mollusca
- Class: Gastropoda
- Family: Pyramidellidae
- Genus: Turbonilla
- Species: T. imperialis

Binomial name
- Turbonilla imperialis Dall & Bartsch, 1909

Synonyms
- Turbonilla (Strioturbonilla) imperialis Dall & Bartsch, 1909

= Turbonilla imperialis =

Species of gastropod

Turbonilla imperialis is a species of sea snail, a marine gastropod mollusk in the family Pyramidellidae, the pyrams and their allies.

== Description ==
The shell has an elongate-conic shape. Its length measures 3.3 mm. Its color is milk-white, with a narrow, faint yellow band in the middle of the whorls between the sutures. There are ar least two whorls in the protoconch. They are depressed, and helicoid. Their axis is at right angles to that of the succeeding turns, in the first of which they are about one-half immersed. The eight whorls of the teleoconch are well rounded, depressed at the summit, and somewhat contracted at the sutures. They are marked by slender, almost vertical axial ribs, of which 20 occur upon the first and second, 22 upon the third, 24 upon the fourth, 26 upon the sixth and penultimate turn. The intercostal spaces are twice as wide as the ribs. They are marked by a series of moderately strong pits at the periphery, and about twenty-six well incised, equal and subequally spaced spiral striations, which pass up on the side of the ribs but do not cross their summits. The periphery of the body whorl is angulated. The base of the shell is short, and well rounded. It is marked by the very feeble continuations of the axial ribs and about twelve equally strong, slender, wavy, spiral striations. The aperture is defective, rhomboidal ?

== Distribution ==
The type specimen was found in the Pacific Ocean off Panama.
