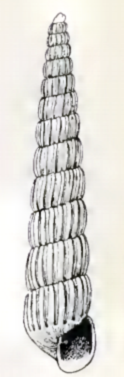
- Drawing of a shell of Turbonilla aresta

Scientific classification
- Kingdom: Animalia
- Phylum: Mollusca
- Class: Gastropoda
- Family: Pyramidellidae
- Genus: Turbonilla
- Species: T. aresta

Binomial name
- Turbonilla aresta Dall & Bartsch, 1909

Synonyms
- Turbonilla (Strioturbonilla) aresta Dall & Bartsch, 1909

= Turbonilla aresta =

Species of gastropod

Turbonilla aresta is a species of sea snail, a marine gastropod mollusc in the family Pyramidellidae, the pyrams and their allies.

== Description ==
The milk-white shell is very slender. Its length measures 6.4 mm. The 2½ whorls of the protoconch are small and form a moderately elevated, hehcoid spire, which has its axis at right angles to that of the succeeding whorls, and is not at all immersed. The 13 whorls of the teleoconch are moderately rounded. They are marked by sublamellar, protractive axial ribs, which extend undiminished to the summit of the whorls, rendering this crenulated. There are 14 of these upon the first three whorls, 16 upon the fourth to eighth, 18 upon the ninth, 20 upon the tenth and eleventh, and 21 upon the penultimate turn. The intercostal spaces are about one and one-half times as wide on all but the last three whorls. On the latter they are about as wide as the ribs and terminate a little posterior to the suture. The sutures are strongly marked. The periphery of the body whorl is faintly angulated. The base of the shell is short, and well rounded. The aperture is moderately large and has a subquadrate shape. The posterior angle is obtuse. The outer lip is thin, and bent almost at right angles to the anterior lateral angle. The columella is slender, slightly curved and slightly revolute.

== Distribution ==
The type specimen was found in the Pacific Ocean off Catalina Island, California.
