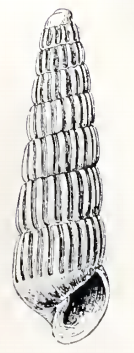
- Drawing of a shell of Turbonilla kelseyi

Scientific classification
- Kingdom: Animalia
- Phylum: Mollusca
- Class: Gastropoda
- Family: Pyramidellidae
- Genus: Turbonilla
- Species: T. kelseyi

Binomial name
- Turbonilla kelseyi Dall & Bartsch, 1909

Synonyms
- Turbonilla (Chemnitzia) kelseyi Dall & Bartsch, 1909

= Turbonilla kelseyi =

Species of gastropod

Turbonilla kelseyi is a species of sea snail, a marine gastropod mollusk in the family Pyramidellidae, the pyrams and their allies.

The species was named for professor F. W. Kelsey.

== Description ==
The small shell is semitransparent. The length measures 4.7 mm. The 2¼ whorls of the protoconch are small, depressed, and helicoid. Their axis is at right angles to that of the succeeding turns, in the first of which they are about one-fifth immersed. The whorls of the teleoconch are moderately rounded. They are ornamented by somewhat sinuous, slightly protractive, rounded axial ribs, which are lower and somewhat expanded at the slightly shouldered summits of the whorls; 14 of these appear upon the third, 16 upon the fourth, 18 upon the fifth, 20 upon the sixth and seventh, 22 upon the eighth, and 24 upon the penultimate whorl of the type. The intercostal spaces are only moderately impressed. They are about as wide as the ribs. The sutures are well impressed. The periphery of the [[body whorl]] is well rounded. The base of the shell is moderately long, and well rounded. The aperture is suboval. The posterior angle is obtuse. The outer lip is thin, showing the external sculpture within. The columella is short, stout, twisted, and provided with a weak fold at its insertion.

== Distribution ==
The type specimen was found in the Pacific Ocean off San Diego, California.
