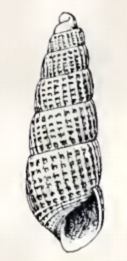
- Drawing of a shell of Turbonilla hipolitensis

Scientific classification
- Kingdom: Animalia
- Phylum: Mollusca
- Class: Gastropoda
- Family: Pyramidellidae
- Genus: Turbonilla
- Species: T. hipolitensis

Binomial name
- Turbonilla hipolitensis Dall & Bartsch, 1909

Synonyms
- Turbonilla (Dunkeria) hipolitensis Dall & Bartsch, 1909

= Turbonilla hipolitensis =

Species of gastropod

Turbonilla hipolitensis is a species of sea snail, a marine gastropod mollusk in the family Pyramidellidae, the pyrams and their allies.

== Description ==
The milk-white shell has a light yellow narrow band midway between the sutures. Its length measures 3.3 mm. The 2½ whorls of the protoconch are small. They form a depressed helicoid spire, whose axis is at right angles to that of the succeeding turns, in the first of which it is about one-third immersed. The seven whorls of the teleoconch are moderately rounded. They are slightly shouldered at the summit but very slightly protracted at the suture. They are marked by moderately strong, rounded, retractive axial ribs, of which 18 occur upon the second, 20 upon the third, 24 upon the fourth and fifth, and 30 upon the penultimate turn. The intercostal spaces as wide as the ribs, crossed by five series of broad spiral pits, which are not quite as wide as the five raised cords which they bound, and which render the ribs somewhat nodulose at their junction. The periphery and the base of the body whorl are well rounded, the latter marked by six spiral cords and a feeble continuation of the axial ribs. The aperture is oval. The posterior angle is acute. The outer lip is thin, showing the external sculpture within. The columella is moderately strong, curved, and reinforced by the base.

== Distribution ==
The type species was found in the Pacific Ocean off San Hipolito Point, Baja California peninsula.
