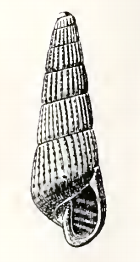
- Drawing of a shell of Turbonilla heterolopha

Scientific classification
- Kingdom: Animalia
- Phylum: Mollusca
- Class: Gastropoda
- Family: Pyramidellidae
- Genus: Turbonilla
- Species: T. heterolopha

Binomial name
- Turbonilla heterolopha Dall & Bartsch, 1909 .

Synonyms
- Turbonilla (Mormula) heterolopha Dall & Bartsch, 1909

= Turbonilla heterolopha =

Species of mollusc

Turbonilla heterolopha is a species of sea snail, a marine gastropod mollusk in the family Pyramidellidae, the pyrams and their allies.

== Description ==
The shell is small and slender. Its length measures 5.5 mm. Its color is chestnut brown with a wax yellow apex The 2½ whorls of the protoconch form a depressed helicoid spire. Its axis is at right angles to that of the succeeding turns, in the first of which it is one-fourth immersed. The seven whorls of the teleoconch are flat. They are appressed at the summit but not constricted at the periphery. They form a spire of almost a straight, uninterrupted outline. The axial sculpture consists of very broad, low, rounded, retractive axial ribs. These ribs are absent on the first turn. But 20 ribs occur upon the second to fourth, 28 upon the fifth and penultimate turn. The intercostal spaces are very narrow. They are marked by six spiral lines of pits. The sutures are poorly defined. The periphery and the base of the body whorl are well rounded. They are marked by the feeble continuations of the axial ribs and seven equally spaced, incised spiral lines. The aperture is oval. The posterior angle is acute. The outer lip is thin, showing the external markings within. It is reinforced on the inside by four or five slender, equally spaced, spiral cords. The columella is strong and somewhat twisted.

== Distribution ==
This species occurs in the Pacific Ocean off California and Baja California.
