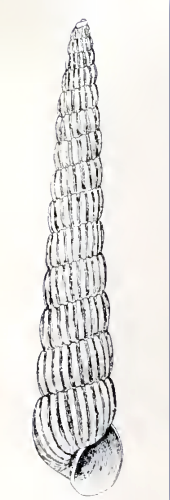
- Drawing of a shell of Turbonilla acra

Scientific classification
- Kingdom: Animalia
- Phylum: Mollusca
- Class: Gastropoda
- Family: Pyramidellidae
- Genus: Turbonilla
- Species: T. acra

Binomial name
- Turbonilla acra Dall & Bartsch, 1909

= Turbonilla acra =

Species of gastropod

Turbonilla acra is a species of sea snail, a marine gastropod mollusk in the family Pyramidellidae, the pyrams and their allies.

== Description ==
The milk-white shell is very long and slender. Its length measures 10 mm. (The whorls of the protoconch are decollated.) The 17 whorls of the teleoconch are situated high between the sutures, varying in outline, the first to eleventh being flattened, almost cylindric, with very strongly shouldered summits; the rest moderately well rounded, with less strongly shouldered summits. The axial ribs are very strong on the first 11 whorls, less so and more rounded on the remaining. There are about 14 upon each of the first eleven turns, 22 upon the twelfth, 20 upon the thirteenth, fourteenth, and fifteenth, and about 30 much enfeebled and irregular ones upon the last turn, where they pass over the well-rounded periphery and base to the umbilical region. On the early turns the axial ribs terminate as strong, exserted cusps at the summit; on the last turns they are merely rounded. Early sutures are strongly marked, later ones well impressed. The aperture is ovate. The posterior angle is acute. The outer lip is thin. The slender columella is almost straight, and obliquely inserted.

== Distribution ==
The type specimen was found in the Pacific Ocean off Catalina Island, California.
