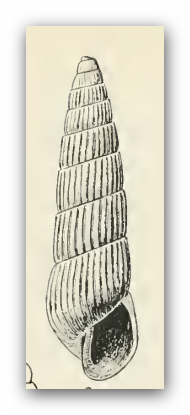
- Drawing of a shell of Turbonilla lucana

Scientific classification
- Kingdom: Animalia
- Phylum: Mollusca
- Class: Gastropoda
- Family: Pyramidellidae
- Genus: Turbonilla
- Species: T. lucana

Binomial name
- Turbonilla lucana Dall & Bartsch, 1909

Synonyms
- Turbonilla (Turbonilla) lucana Dall & Bartsch, 1909

= Turbonilla lucana =

Species of gastropod

Turbonilla lucana is a species of sea snail, a marine gastropod mollusk in the family Pyramidellidae, the pyrams and their allies.

== Description ==
The milk-white shell has an elongate-conic shape. Its length measures 6 mm. (The whorls of the protoconch are decollated). The nine whorls of the teleoconch are well rounded, slightly excurved at the summit, and weakly shouldered. They are marked by slender, sinuous, retractive axial ribs, of which 20 occur upon the third, 22 upon the fourth and fifth, 26 upon the sixth and seventh, and 30 upon the penultimate whorl. The intercostal spaces are a little narrower than the ribs, shallow, the depressed portion terminating at the periphery. The sutures are well marked. The base of the shell is moderately long. It is marked by the slender continuations of the axial ribs, which extend to the umbilical area. The aperture is oval. The posterior angle is acute. The outer lip is thin, showing the external markings within. The columella is moderately strong, curved, reinforced by the attenuated base for two-thirds of its length and provided with a weak fold at its insertion.

== Distribution ==
The type specimen was found in the Pacific Ocean off Cape St. Lucas, Baja California Peninsula.
