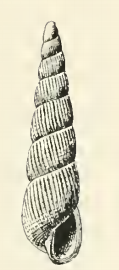
- Drawing of a shell of Turbonilla ceralva

Scientific classification
- Kingdom: Animalia
- Phylum: Mollusca
- Class: Gastropoda
- Family: Pyramidellidae
- Genus: Turbonilla
- Species: T. ceralva

Binomial name
- Turbonilla ceralva Dall & Bartsch, 1909

Synonyms
- Turbonilla (Pyrgiscus) ceralva Dall & Bartsch, 1909

= Turbonilla ceralva =

Species of gastropod

Turbonilla ceralva is a species of sea snail, a marine gastropod mollusk in the family Pyramidellidae, the pyrams and their allies.

== Description ==
The milk-white shell is small and slender. Its length measures 3.7 mm. The 1¾ helicoid whorls of the protoconch are depressed. Their axis is at right angles to that of the succeeding turns. They are not immersed. The seven whorls of the teleoconch are situated very high between the sutures. They are moderately rounded, very slightly shouldered at the summit, and somewhat contracted at the sutures. They are marked by slender, curved, rounded, decidedly retractive axial ribs, which are very feebly expressed on the first whorl, on all the rest excepting the penultimate, which has 40 ribs, there are 36. The intercostal spaces about as wide as the ribs. They are marked by seven equal and equally spaced spiral pits. The periphery and the base of the body whorl are well rounded, the latter marked by the continuations of the axial ribs and eight equally spaced series of spiral pits, of which those nearest the umbilicus are a little less strongly developed than the rest. The oval aperture is moderately large. The posterior angle is acute. The outer lip is thin, showing the external sculpture within. The columella is slender, decidedly curved, and somewhat twisted.

== Distribution ==
The type specimen was found in the Pacific Ocean off La Paz, Baja California.
