= Turbonilla diegensis =

- Drawing of a shell of Turbonilla diegensis

Scientific classification
- Kingdom: Animalia
- Phylum: Mollusca
- Class: Gastropoda
- Family: Pyramidellidae
- Genus: Turbonilla
- Species: T. diegensis

Binomial name
- Turbonilla diegensis Dall & Bartsch, 1909

Synonyms
- Turbonilla (Turbonilla) diegensis Dall & Bartsch, 1909

Species of gastropod

Turbonilla diegensis is a species of sea snail, a marine gastropod mollusk in the family Pyramidellidae, the pyrams and their allies.

== Description ==
The subdiaphanous to dingy white shell is small. Its length measures 5.3 mm. The 2½ helicoid whorls of the protoconch are loosely coiled, decidedly elevated, and about one-fifth immersed. Their axis is at a right angle to that of the later whorls. The ten whorls of the teleoconch are moderately rounded. They are somewhat overhanging, the greatest convexity being on the lower third of the exposed portion of the whorls, traversed by 14 broad, coarse and strong, oblique, and somewhat flexuous axial ribs on the fourth and seventh whorl and 18 on the eighth. These ribs extend over the angulated periphery to the umbilical region, appearing fainter on the base. The deep intercostal grooves terminate at the periphery, i. e., do not appear on the base as gouged out spaces, as they do posterior to the periphery, but simply as plain shallow grooves between the ribs formed by the raising of these above the general surface of the shell. The whorls slope rapidly toward the suture and are somewhat contracted and shouldered at the summit, thus marking a prominent subchanneled suture. The aperture is large, broadly ovate, showing the axial ribs within. The outer lip is thin, subpatulous, shortly curved to meet the short, somewhat revolute, slightly twisted, columella.

== Distribution ==
The type specimen was found in the Pacific Ocean off San Diego, California.
