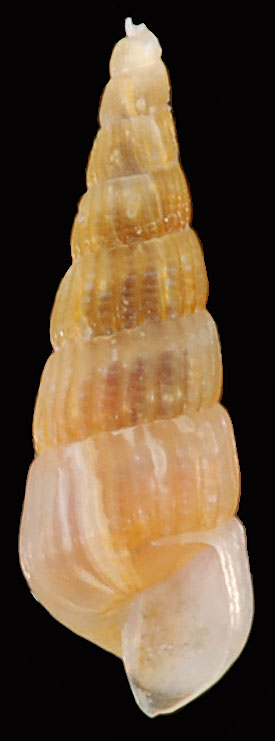
- Turbonilla buteonis, 6 mm. York River, Gloucester County, VA - 09/29/17.

Scientific classification
- Kingdom: Animalia
- Phylum: Mollusca
- Class: Gastropoda
- Family: Pyramidellidae
- Genus: Turbonilla
- Species: T. buteonis

Binomial name
- Turbonilla buteonis Bartsch, 1909

Synonyms
- Pyrgiscus buteonis (Bartsch, 1909); Pyrgiscus kurtzii (Mazyck, 1913); Turbonilla interrupta auct. non Totten, 1835; Turbonilla kurtzii Mazyck, 1913

= Turbonilla buteonis =

Species of gastropod

Turbonilla buteonis is a species of sea snail, a marine gastropod mollusk in the family Pyramidellidae, the pyrams and their allies.

== Distribution ==
This species occurs in the following locations:

- Gulf of Mexico
- Northwest Atlantic: Massachusetts, Virginia, North Carolina

== Notes ==
Additional information regarding this species:

- Distribution: Range: 41.5°N to 32.7°N; 80°W to 70.7°W. Distribution: USA: Massachusetts, Virginia, North Carolina
