= Turbonilla magnacastanea =

Scientific classification
- Kingdom: Animalia
- Phylum: Mollusca
- Class: Gastropoda
- Family: Pyramidellidae
- Genus: Turbonilla
- Species: T. magnacastanea

Binomial name
- Turbonilla magnacastanea Peñas & Rolán, 2010

Species of gastropod

Turbonilla magnacastanea is a species of sea snail, a marine gastropod mollusk in the family Pyramidellidae, the pyrams and their allies.

== Description ==
The shell is large for the genus, reaching a length of 18 mm. It is elongate-conic, solid, and composed of numerous (approximately 12-14) flattened whorls. The suture is deeply impressed. The shell's most distinctive feature is its rich, chestnut-brown coloration, from which it derives its species name 'magnacastanea' (Latin: 'large chestnut'). The surface sculpture consists of numerous, closely spaced, slightly protractive axial ribs, which are strongest on the early whorls and become somewhat subdued on the later ones. The base of the shell is rounded, and the aperture is subquadrate. The outer lip is simple and thickened internally.* The shell grows to a length of 18 mm. The description in the original article claiming mollusks "select" their shell is biologically inaccurate for this group; gastropods in the family Pyramidellidae secrete their own shells. Distinguishing features are still being discovered and categorized.

== Distribution ==
This species is known from bathyal depths in the Western Pacific Ocean. This species occurs in the Pacific Ocean off the Solomon Islands. The type locality is the Solomon Sea, near the Santa Isabel Island, at depths of approximately 800 to 1000 meters.

== Habitat and Ecology ==
Like other members of the genus Turbonilla, this species is likely an ectoparasite, feeding on the bodily fluids of other marine invertebrates such as polychaete worms or other mollusks using a specialized proboscis. Its deep-water habitat suggests it is part of the diverse bathyal benthic community.
