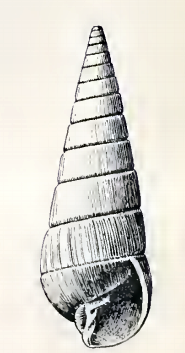
- Drawing of a shell of Turbonilla mexicana

Scientific classification
- Kingdom: Animalia
- Phylum: Mollusca
- Class: Gastropoda
- Family: Pyramidellidae
- Genus: Turbonilla
- Species: T. mexicana

Binomial name
- Turbonilla mexicana Dall & Bartsch, 1909

Synonyms
- Turbonilla (Longchaeus) mexicana Dall & Bartsch, 1909

= Turbonilla mexicana =

Species of gastropod

Turbonilla mexicana is a species of sea snail, a marine gastropod mollusk in the family Pyramidellidae, the pyrams and their allies.

== Description ==
The robust dull brown shell is large and broadly conic. The whorls of the protoconch are decollated and probably the first whorl of teleoconch is missing from the type specimen. All but the last whorl of the teleoconch are flattened, flatly shouldered and crenulated at the summit. The body whorl is inflated and well rounded. The periphery of the body whorl is marked by a strong sulcus. The sutures are channeled. The entire surface of the spire and the base is marked by lines of growth, which are quite prominent on the last turn. The base is inflated, strongly rounded, with a slender fasciole at the insertion of the columella. The aperture is oval. The posterior angle is acute. The shell is slightly channeled anteriorly. The outer lip is thin, with a white band at the periphery. The remainder is brown with darker colored lines, reinforced deeply within by five spiral cords, two of which are posterior and three anterior to the periphery. The conic columella is stout, with a strong lamellar fold at its insertion and two much more oblique ones anterior to it.

== Distribution ==
The type specimen was found off Scammon Lagoon, Baja California peninsula.
