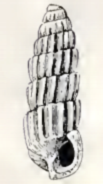
- Drawing of a shell of Turbonilla gilli

Scientific classification
- Kingdom: Animalia
- Phylum: Mollusca
- Class: Gastropoda
- Family: Pyramidellidae
- Genus: Turbonilla
- Species: T. gilli

Binomial name
- Turbonilla gilli Dall & Bartsch, 1907

Synonyms
- Turbonilla (Turbonilla) gilli Dall & Bartsch, 1907

= Turbonilla gilli =

Species of gastropod

Turbonilla gilli is a species of sea snail, a marine gastropod mollusk in the family Pyramidellidae, the pyrams and their allies.

== Description ==
The dirty white shell is small, rather stout, and inflated. The shell grows to a length of 3.3 mm. The whorls of the protoconch are decollated. The teleoconch contains eight whorls. The early whorls are well rounded, the later ones flat, and broader at the summit than at the suture. The sculpture shows about fourteen strong, almost vertical, scalariform axial ribs on the second, and sixteen quite protractive ones on the succeeding whorls. On the penultimate turn, however, they are less oblique than on those preceding it. These ribs are very strongly developed at the summit of the whorls and render the deeply channeled suture decidedly coronated. The intercostal spaces are deep, of about double the width of the ribs. They are interrupted suddenly at the decidedly angulated (almost keeled) periphery of the last whorl beyond which they reappear. The base of the shell is strongly contracted, and quite short. It is marked by the faint continuations of the axial ribs which extend to the uinbilical region. The outer lip is fractured. The columella is very strong, somewhat curved and revolute, and provided with a subobsolete oblique fold.

== Distribution ==
The type specimen was found in the Pacific Ocean off San Diego, California.
