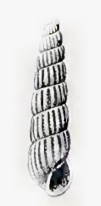
- Drawing of a shell of Turbonilla lepta

Scientific classification
- Kingdom: Animalia
- Phylum: Mollusca
- Class: Gastropoda
- Family: Pyramidellidae
- Genus: Turbonilla
- Species: T. lepta

Binomial name
- Turbonilla lepta Dall & Bartsch, 1909

Synonyms
- Turbonilla (Pyrgiscus) lepta Dall & Bartsch, 1909

= Turbonilla lepta =

Species of gastropod

Turbonilla lepta is a species of sea snail, a marine gastropod mollusk in the family Pyramidellidae, the pyrams and their allies.

== Description ==
The milk-white shell is very slender and has an elongate-conic shape. The shell grows to a length of 2.7 mm. The 1¾ whorls of the protoconch are depressed, and helicoid. Their axis is at right angles to that of the succeeding turns, in the first of which they are very slightly immersed. The eight whorls of the teleoconch are slightly rounded. They are marked by well-developed, straight, rounded, strongly retractive axial ribs, of which there are 20 upon the first, 18 upon the second to sixth, and 20 upon the penultimate turn. The intercostal spaces are about as wide as the ribs. They are marked by eight equal and equally spaced incised spiral lines. The sutures are well impressed. The periphery and the base of the body whorl are well rounded. They are marked by the continuations of the axial ribs and five equal and equally spaced incised spiral lines. The aperture is oval. The posterior angle is acute. The outer lip is thin, showing the external sculpture within. The columella is slender, curved, and slightly revolute.

== Distribution ==
The type specimen occurs off La Paz at the Gulf of California.
