= Turbonilla muricatoides =

- Drawing of a shell of Turbonilla muricatoides

Scientific classification
- Kingdom: Animalia
- Phylum: Mollusca
- Class: Gastropoda
- Family: Pyramidellidae
- Genus: Turbonilla
- Species: T. muricatoides

Binomial name
- Turbonilla muricatoides Dall & Bartsch, 1907

Synonyms
- Turbonilla (Chemnitzia) muricatoides Dall and Bartsch, 1907

Species of gastropod

Turbonilla muricatoides is a species of sea snail, a marine gastropod mollusk in the family Pyramidellidae, the pyrams and their allies.

== Description ==
The small, slender shell is subdiaphanous to milk white. Its length measures 3 mm. The 2½ whorls of the protoconch are helicoid but slightly elevated and well rounded. Their axis is at right angles to the axis of the teleoconch. The seven whorls of the teleoconch are smooth, rather high between the sutures, and moderately rounded. They are marked by strong sublamellar axial ribs, which are about half as wide as the spaces that separate them, and extend strongly to the very summit of the whorl where they render the well-marked sutures crenulate. There are 14 of these ribs upon the first, 18 upon the fifth, and 20 upon the penultimate turn. The depressed intercostal spaces terminate abruptly at the periphery. The base of the body whorl is well rounded, smooth and without sculpture. The outer lip of the type specimen is fractured, giving no indication about the aperture. The columella is slender and slightly twisted.

== Distribution ==
The type specimen was found in the Pacific Ocean off Monterey, California.
