= Turbonilla favilla =

Scientific classification
- Kingdom: Animalia
- Phylum: Mollusca
- Class: Gastropoda
- Family: Pyramidellidae
- Genus: Turbonilla
- Species: T. favilla

Binomial name
- Turbonilla favilla Dall & Bartsch, 1909

Synonyms
- Chemnitzia coelata Carpenter, 1865; Turbonilla (Pyrgiscus) favilla Dall & Bartsch, 1909; Turbonilla (Pyrgiscus) hypocurta Dall & Bartsch, 1909

Species of gastropod

Turbonilla favilla is a species of sea snail, a marine gastropod mollusk in the family Pyramidellidae, the pyrams and their allies.

== Description ==
The quite large, ashy shell has an elongate shape. the length of the shell measures 8.8 mm.(The whorls of the protoconch are decollated). The 13 whorls of the teleoconch are flattened. They are separated by weakly impressed sutures. There are 20 to 28 axial ribs, straight, subacute, and suddenly truncated at the periphery. The intercostal spaces are marked by 4 to 5 deeply impressed spiral grooves, which pass up on the sides of the ribs but do not cross their summits. The periphery of the body whorl is angulated. The base of the shell is short, and marked by 6 spiral lines. The aperture is subquadrate. The columella is strongly twisted. The shell is remarkable for its deep furrow and the suddenly shortened and spirally sculptured base.

== Distribution ==
Dr. Carpenter thought the type specimen was found in the Pacific Ocean off Panama (type specimen without locality mark).
