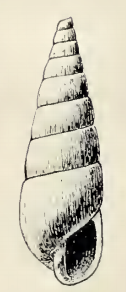
- Drawing of a shell of Turbonilla abreojensis

Scientific classification
- Kingdom: Animalia
- Phylum: Mollusca
- Class: Gastropoda
- Family: Pyramidellidae
- Genus: Turbonilla
- Species: T. abreojensis

Binomial name
- Turbonilla abreojensis Dall & Bartsch, 1909

Synonyms
- Turbonilla (Ptycheulimella) abreojensis Dall & Bartsch, 1909

= Turbonilla abreojensis =

Species of gastropod

Turbonilla abreojensis is a species of sea snail, a marine gastropod mollusk in the family Pyramidellidae, the pyrams and their allies.

== Description ==
The milk-white shell has a conical shape. (The whorls of the protoconch are decollated.) The length of the shell measures just over 5 mm. The ten whorls of the teleoconch are moderately well rounded, and very slightly shouldered at the summit. They are marked by mere indications of obsolete ribs near the summit of the early whorls, only. The sutures are well impressed. The periphery is well rounded. The base of the shell is moderately long, and well rounded. The surface of the spire and the base is marked by fine, closely crowded, spiral striations. The aperture is oval. The posterior angle is acute. The columella is rather strong, moderately curved, and somewhat revolute. It is provided with an oblique fold a little anterior to the insertion.

== Distribution ==
This species occurs in the Pacific Ocean off Baja California.
