= Turbonilla javii =

Scientific classification
- Kingdom: Animalia
- Phylum: Mollusca
- Class: Gastropoda
- Family: Pyramidellidae
- Genus: Turbonilla
- Species: T. javii

Binomial name
- Turbonilla javii Peñas & Rolán, 2010

Species of gastropod

Turbonilla javii is a species of sea snail, a marine gastropod mollusk in the family Pyramidellidae, the pyrams and their allies.

== Description ==
The shell grows to a length of 3.8 mm.

== Taxonomic classification ==
Turbonilla javii is classified within the domain Eukarya, kingdom Animalia, phylum Mollusca, class Gastropoda, subclass Heterobranchia, order Pylopulmonata, superfamily Pyramidelloidea, family Pyramidellidae, subfamily Turbonillinae, genus Turbonilla, and species T. javii.

The family Pyramidellidae comprises ectoparasitic gastropods that feed on other mollusks, often using a proboscis to extract nutrients from host tissues. Turbonilla is a large genus within this family, characterized by small, turreted shells with an elevated spire, encompassing numerous species of minute marine snails distributed globally.

The species was originally described by Peñas and Rolán in 2010, in the publication Mémoires du Muséum national d'Histoire naturelle (Volume 200, pages 83–85).

== Distribution ==
This species occurs in the Pacific Ocean off the Solomons.
