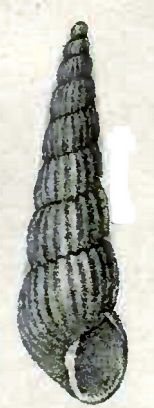
- Drawing of a shell of Turbonilla ornata

Scientific classification
- Kingdom: Animalia
- Phylum: Mollusca
- Class: Gastropoda
- Family: Pyramidellidae
- Genus: Turbonilla
- Species: T. ornata

Binomial name
- Turbonilla ornata (d'Orbigny, 1840)

Synonyms
- Turbonilla protracta Dall, 1892

= Turbonilla ornata =

Species of gastropod

Turbonilla ornata, common name the ornate turbonilla, is a species of sea snail, a marine gastropod mollusk in the family Pyramidellidae, the pyrams and their allies.

== Description ==
The thin, white shell is closely longitudinally ribbed and spirally striate. Its length attains 6 mm. The 10 whorls of the teleoconch are slightly convex. The suture is deep and crenulated.

== Distribution ==
This species occurs in the Atlantic Ocean off the Mid-Atlantic Ridge and from North Carolina to the Dominican Republic; in the Caribbean Sea off Jamaica, Guadeloupe and Martinique.
