= Turbonilla farroupilha =

Scientific classification
- Kingdom: Animalia
- Phylum: Mollusca
- Class: Gastropoda
- Family: Pyramidellidae
- Genus: Turbonilla
- Species: T. farroupilha

Binomial name
- Turbonilla farroupilha Pimenta & Absalao, 2004

Species of gastropod

Turbonilla farroupilha is a species of sea snail, a marine gastropod mollusk in the family Pyramidellidae, the pyrams and their allies.

== Description ==
The shell grows approximately 7.8 mm in length and is small, tall and conical in shape. The whorls are more convex toward their lower half, with a distinct, slightly sinuous suture. The shell sculpture consists of more than 35 closely spaced axial ribs, which are straight to slightly backward-slanting and separated by very narrow interspaces. The ribs terminate before the following whorl, leaving a smooth area immediately above the suture, The base is rounded and smooth, and the aperture is rhomboidal with a rounded anterior margin.

== Distribution ==
Turbonilla farroupilha has been recorded in the Atlantic Ocean off the Brazilian coast, from Rio de Janeiro to Rio Grande do Sul, at depths of approximately 42-56 m. Its type locality is off Rio Grande, Rio Grande do Sul, Brazil.
