= Turbonilla farinatiae =

Scientific classification
- Kingdom: Animalia
- Phylum: Mollusca
- Class: Gastropoda
- Family: Pyramidellidae
- Genus: Turbonilla
- Species: T. farinatiae

Binomial name
- Turbonilla farinatiae Pimenta & Absalao, 2004

Species of gastropod

Turbonilla farinatiae is a species of sea snail, a marine gastropod mollusk in the family Pyramidellidae, the pyrams and their allies.

== Description ==
The shell grows to a length of 6.4 mm. The type locality of Turbonilla farinatiae is off Cabo Frio, Rio de Janeiro state, Brazil (22°53′42″S 41°50′30″W), at a depth of 50 m, and the holotype is deposited at the Museu Nacional do Rio de Janeiro (MNRJ 8931).

== Distribution ==
Turbonilla farinatiae occurs in the southwestern Atlantic Ocean, with a range extending from off Camburi, Espírito Santo state, Brazil, southward to Puerto Lobos, Río Negro Province, Argentina. Living specimens have been recorded at depths of 9.5 to 12 m, and empty shells collected from depths between 5 and 60 m.
