= Turbonilla mighelsi =

Scientific classification
- Kingdom: Animalia
- Phylum: Mollusca
- Class: Gastropoda
- Family: Pyramidellidae
- Genus: Turbonilla
- Species: T. mighelsi

Binomial name
- Turbonilla mighelsi Bartsch, 1909

Synonyms
- Pleurotoma acuminata Mighels, J.W., 1848 (preoccupied name); Pyrgiscus mighelsi (Bartsch, 1909); Turbonilla (Pyrgiscus) mighelsi Bartsch, P., 1909; Turbonilla costulata A. E. Verrill, 1873; Turbonilla mighelsi Bartsch, 1909; Turbonilla obesa Bush, 1909

Species of gastropod

Turbonilla mighelsi is a species of sea snail, a marine gastropod mollusk in the family Pyramidellidae, the pyramids and their allies.

== Description ==
The length of the shell reaches 3.8 mm.

== Distribution ==
This species occurs in the following locations:

- Northwest Atlantic Ocean : range: 41.5°N to 41.3°N; 72.9°W to 70.7°W. (USA: Massachusetts, Connecticut)
