= Turbonilla magdalinensis =

Scientific classification
- Kingdom: Animalia
- Phylum: Mollusca
- Class: Gastropoda
- Family: Pyramidellidae
- Genus: Turbonilla
- Species: T. magdalinensis

Binomial name
- Turbonilla magdalinensis Bartsch, 1927

Synonyms
- Turbonilla (Ptycheulimella) magalinensis Bartsch, 1927

Species of gastropod

Turbonilla magdalinensis is a species of sea snail, a marine gastropod mollusk in the family Pyramidellidae, the pyrams and their allies.

== Description ==
The bluish white shell has an elongate conic shape. The length of the shell measures 7.4 mm. The teleoconch of the type specimen contains 11½ whorls, marked by very fine, closely spaced, incised spiral lines. The short, rounded base of the shell shows rather strong incremental lines and the same spiral sculpture as seen on the spire. The oval aperture has a thin outer lip. The inner lip is slightly sinuous and reflected over. The parietal wall is covered by a thin callus.

== Distribution ==
The type specimen was found in the Pacific Ocean of Magdalena Bay, Baja California peninsula.
