= Turbonilla iolausi =

Scientific classification
- Kingdom: Animalia
- Phylum: Mollusca
- Class: Gastropoda
- Family: Pyramidellidae
- Genus: Turbonilla
- Species: T. iolausi

Binomial name
- Turbonilla iolausi Bartsch, 1955

Synonyms
- Turbonilla acisi Bartsch, 1955; Turbonilla antaeusi Bartsch, 1955; Turbonilla terra Bartsch, 1955

Species of gastropod

Turbonilla iolausi is a species of sea snail, a marine gastropod mollusk in the family Pyramidellidae, the pyrams and their allies. They were first described by Paul Bartsch in 1955.

== Description ==
The length of the shell attains 4.2mm. It features a highly elongated shell.

== Distribution ==
Turbonilla iolausi is primarily documented within the Gulf of Mexico, specifically originating from the Pliocene fossil beds of North St. Petersburg, Florida. First detailed in Paul Bartsch's 1955 monograph published by the Smithsonian Institution.. Within its broader ecological envelope, it lives and occupies marine environments at recorded depths reaching up to 46 metres.
