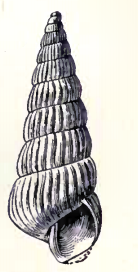
- Drawing of a shell of Turbonilla curta

Scientific classification
- Kingdom: Animalia
- Phylum: Mollusca
- Class: Gastropoda
- Family: Pyramidellidae
- Genus: Turbonilla
- Species: T. curta

Binomial name
- Turbonilla curta Dall, 1889

Synonyms
- Chemnitzia curta (Dall, 1889); Turbonilla rentsii Clessin, 1900

= Turbonilla curta =

Species of gastropod

Turbonilla curta is a species of sea snail, a marine gastropod mollusk in the family Pyramidellidae, the pyrams and their allies.

== Description ==
The shell grows to a length of 8.3 mm.

== Distribution ==
This marine species occurs in the following locations at depths between 0 m and 1170 m:

- Caribbean Sea: Colombia, Mexico, Venezuela
- Gulf of Mexico: East Florida, Louisiana, Texas
- Atlantic Ocean: North Carolina, West Florida
