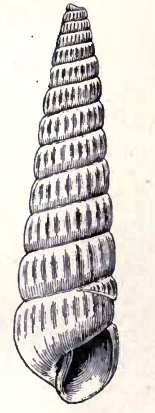
- Drawing of a shell of Turbonilla belotheca

Scientific classification
- Kingdom: Animalia
- Phylum: Mollusca
- Class: Gastropoda
- Family: Pyramidellidae
- Genus: Turbonilla
- Species: T. belotheca

Binomial name
- Turbonilla belotheca Dall, 1889

Synonyms
- Chemnitzia belotheca (Dall, 1889)

= Turbonilla belotheca =

Species of gastropod

Turbonilla belotheca is a species of sea snail, a marine gastropod mollusk in the family Pyramidellidae, the pyrams and their allies.

== Description ==
The shell grows to a length of 14 mm.

== Distribution ==
This species occurs in the following locations:

- Caribbean Sea
- Gulf of Mexico
- Lesser Antilles : Virgin Islands, Barbados
