= Turbonilla edwardensis =

Scientific classification
- Kingdom: Animalia
- Phylum: Mollusca
- Class: Gastropoda
- Family: Pyramidellidae
- Genus: Turbonilla
- Species: T. edwardensis

Binomial name
- Turbonilla edwardensis Bartsch, 1909

Synonyms
- Pyrgiscus edwardensis (Bartsch, 1909)

Species of gastropod

Turbonilla edwardensis is a species of sea snail, a marine gastropod mollusk in the family Pyramidellidae, the pyrams and their allies.

== Description ==
The shell grows to a length of 5.2 mm.

== Distribution ==
This species occurs in the following locations:

- Northwest Atlantic : Prince Edward Island

== Notes ==
Additional information regarding this species:

- Distribution: Prince Edward Island (from the northern tip of Miscou Island, N.B. to Cape Breton Island south of Chéticamp, including the Northumberland Strait and Georges Bay to the Canso Strait causeway)
- Habitat: infralittoral of the gulf and estuary
