= Turbonilla miona =

Scientific classification
- Kingdom: Animalia
- Phylum: Mollusca
- Class: Gastropoda
- Family: Pyramidellidae
- Genus: Turbonilla
- Species: T. miona

Binomial name
- Turbonilla miona Bartsch, 1927

Synonyms
- Pyrgiscus miona (Bartsch, 1927); Turbonilla (Pyrgiscus) miona Bartsch, 1927

Species of gastropod

Turbonilla miona is a species of sea snail, a marine gastropod mollusk in the family Pyramidellidae, the pyrams and their allies.

== Description ==
The shell reaches a length of 4.2 mm and a diameter of 1.2 mm. It is light blue-white and elongated. Its nuclear whorls number two, and are unmarked, while the rest feature 18 to 20 axial ribs. The intercostal spaces are thinner than the ribs, and are marked with spiral lines. The aperture is ovate and short.

== Distribution ==
This species occurs in the Atlantic Ocean off Georgia, USA at a depth of 805 meters.
