= Turbonilla dispar =

Scientific classification
- Kingdom: Animalia
- Phylum: Mollusca
- Class: Gastropoda
- Family: Pyramidellidae
- Genus: Turbonilla
- Species: T. dispar

Binomial name
- Turbonilla dispar Pilsbry, 1897

Synonyms
- Pyrgiscus dispar (Pilsbry, 1897)

Species of gastropod

Turbonilla dispar is a species of sea snail, a marine gastropod mollusk in the family Pyramidellidae, the pyrams and their allies.

== Description ==
The shell grows to a length between 4 mm and 9.5 mm, with it also having 2-3 mm in diameter. The shell has 8 somewhat curved whorls after the nucleus, with the spire having less than 2. The structure of the spiral grooves at unequal intervals have oblong punctures, with the upper part of the spire have square punctures. The shell is a light brown.

== Distribution ==
This species occurs in the Atlantic Ocean off Brazil, Uruguay ad Argentina at depths between 5 m and 65 m.
