= Turbonilla lopezyartoi =

Scientific classification
- Kingdom: Animalia
- Phylum: Mollusca
- Class: Gastropoda
- Family: Pyramidellidae
- Genus: Turbonilla
- Species: T. lopezyartoi

Binomial name
- Turbonilla lopezyartoi Peñas & Rolán, 2010

Species of gastropod

Turbonilla lopezyartoi is a species of sea snail, a marine gastropod mollusk in the family Pyramidellidae, the pyrams and their allies. This species was described by Peñas & Rolán in 2010 from fossils found off the Solomon Islands.

== Description ==
The length of the shell measures 4.5 mm. The shell is slender and has a long, fusiform spire with about 4 whorls. The whorls are slightly convex and ornamented with fine longitudinal ribs that cross over the spiral cords, forming a reticulate pattern. The body whorl is smooth and shiny, with a thickened outer lip. The aperture is oval and has a simple columella.

== Distribution ==
This marine shell occurs off the Solomon Islands.
