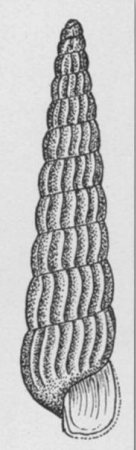
- Drawing of a shell of Turbonilla penistoni

Scientific classification
- Kingdom: Animalia
- Phylum: Mollusca
- Class: Gastropoda
- Family: Pyramidellidae
- Genus: Turbonilla
- Species: T. penistoni

Binomial name
- Turbonilla penistoni Bush, 1899

Synonyms
- Turbonilla inclinata Bush; Turbonilla swiftii Bush, 1899

= Turbonilla penistoni =

Species of gastropod

Turbonilla penistoni is a species of sea snail, a marine gastropod mollusk in the family Pyramidellidae, the pyrams and their allies.

== Distribution ==
This species occurs in the following locations:

- Caribbean Sea
- Cuba
- Gulf of Mexico
- Jamaica
- Lesser Antilles
