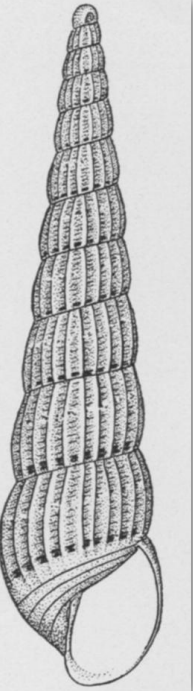
- Drawing of an apertural view of Turbonilla pyrrha

Scientific classification
- Kingdom: Animalia
- Phylum: Mollusca
- Class: Gastropoda
- Family: Pyramidellidae
- Genus: Turbonilla
- Species: T. pyrrha

Binomial name
- Turbonilla pyrrha Bush, 1899

= Turbonilla pyrrha =

Species of gastropod

Turbonilla pyrrha is a species of sea snail, a marine gastropod mollusk in the family Pyramidellidae, the pyrams and their allies.
