= Turbonilla haroldi =

Scientific classification
- Kingdom: Animalia
- Phylum: Mollusca
- Class: Gastropoda
- Family: Pyramidellidae
- Genus: Turbonilla
- Species: T. haroldi

Binomial name
- Turbonilla haroldi E. A. Smith, 1890

Species of gastropod

Turbonilla haroldi is a species of sea snail, a marine gastropod mollusk in the family Pyramidellidae, the pyrams and their allies. The species was discovered by malacologist William Healy Dall in 1919.

== Description ==
The species grows a translucent, smooth shell up to a length of 2.5 mm. The overall size can reach 6.4 mm in height, and 2.1 mm in width.

== Distribution ==
This species occurs in the Atlantic Ocean off St Helena, and in many islands northeast of New Zealand's North Island. The species can also be seen throughout the Western Atlantic Ocean, the Caribbean Sea, and the Gulf of Mexico.
