= Turbonilla fasciata =

Scientific classification
- Kingdom: Animalia
- Phylum: Mollusca
- Class: Gastropoda
- Family: Pyramidellidae
- Genus: Turbonilla
- Species: T. fasciata

Binomial name
- Turbonilla fasciata (d'Orbigny, 1840)

Synonyms
- Chemnitzia fasciata d'Orbigny, 1840 (basionym); Pyrgiscus fasciata (d'Orbigny, 1840); Pyrgostelis fasciata (d'Orbigny, 1840); Turbonilla (Chemnitzia) fasciata (d'Orbigny, 1840)

Species of gastropod

Turbonilla fasciata is a species of sea snail, a marine gastropod mollusk in the family Pyramidellidae, the pyrams and their allies.

== Description ==
The length of the shell attains 5.5 mm.

== Distribution ==
This species occurs in the Atlantic Ocean off Brazil.
