= Turbonilla hecuba =

Scientific classification
- Kingdom: Animalia
- Phylum: Mollusca
- Class: Gastropoda
- Family: Pyramidellidae
- Genus: Turbonilla
- Species: T. hecuba

Binomial name
- Turbonilla hecuba Dall & Bartsch, 1913

Synonyms
- Turbonilla (Pyrgiscus) hecuba Dall and Bartsch, 1913

Species of gastropod

Turbonilla hecuba is a species of sea snail, a marine gastropod mollusk in the family Pyramidellidae, the pyrams and their allies.

== Description ==
The shell grows to a length of 6.1 mm.

== Distribution ==
This species occurs in the following locations:

- Northwest Atlantic: off Nova Scotia at a depth of 35 m.

== Notes ==
Additional information regarding this species:

- Distribution: Barrington Passage, Nova Scotia
