= Turbonilla melea =

Scientific classification
- Kingdom: Animalia
- Phylum: Mollusca
- Class: Gastropoda
- Family: Pyramidellidae
- Genus: Turbonilla
- Species: T. melea

Binomial name
- Turbonilla melea Bartsch, 1927

Synonyms
- Turbonilla (Ptycheulimella) melea Bartsch in Dall, 1927

Species of gastropod

Turbonilla melea is a species of sea snail, a marine gastropod mollusk in the family Pyramidellidae, the pyrams and their allies.

== Taxonomy ==
This is a unreplaced junior homonym (invalid: junior homonym of Turbonilla melea Bartsch, 1924)

== Description ==
The shell grows to a length of 3.3 mm.

== Distribution ==
This species occurs in the Atlantic Ocean off Georgia, USA, at a depth of 538 m.
