= Turbonilla lillybeckae =

Scientific classification
- Kingdom: Animalia
- Phylum: Mollusca
- Class: Gastropoda
- Family: Pyramidellidae
- Genus: Turbonilla
- Species: T. lillybeckae

Binomial name
- Turbonilla lillybeckae Nowell-Usticke, 1969

Synonyms
- Strioturbonilla lillybeckae Usticke, 1969; Turbonilla (Strioturbonilla) lillybeckae Nowell-Usticke, G.W., 1969

Species of gastropod

Turbonilla lillybeckae is a species of sea snails, a marine gastropod mollusc in the family Pyramidellidae, the pyrams and their allies.

== Description ==
The shell grows to a length of 9.5 mm.

== Distribution ==
This marine species occurs in the Caribbean Sea off St. Croix, Virgin Islands.
