= Turbonilla haycocki =

Scientific classification
- Kingdom: Animalia
- Phylum: Mollusca
- Class: Gastropoda
- Family: Pyramidellidae
- Genus: Turbonilla
- Species: T. haycocki

Binomial name
- Turbonilla haycocki Dall & Bartsch, 1911

Synonyms
- Pyrgiscus haycocki (Dall & Bartsch, 1911); Turbonilla (Strioturbonilla) haycocki Dall & Bartsch, 1911

Species of gastropod

Turbonilla haycocki is a species of sea snail, a marine gastropod mollusk in the family Pyramidellidae, the pyrams and their allies.

== Description ==
The shell grows to a length of 7 mm.

== Distribution ==
This marine species occurs off Bermuda (at a depth of 75 m), Puerto Rico, and Northeast Brazil
