= Turbonilla edgarii =

Scientific classification
- Kingdom: Animalia
- Phylum: Mollusca
- Class: Gastropoda
- Family: Pyramidellidae
- Genus: Turbonilla
- Species: T. edgarii

Binomial name
- Turbonilla edgarii (Melvill, 1896)

Synonyms
- Pyrgulina edgarii Melvill, 1896 (original combination); Turbonilla edgari [sic] (misspelling)

Species of gastropod

Turbonilla edgarii is a species of sea snail, a marine gastropod mollusk in the family Pyramidellidae, the pyrams and their allies.

== Distribution ==
This marine species occurs in the following locations:

- European waters (ERMS scope)
- Mediterranean Sea : Israeli part of the Mediterranean Sea - Eastern Basin (introduced: alien)
- Mersin Bay
