= Turbonilla louiseae =

Scientific classification
- Kingdom: Animalia
- Phylum: Mollusca
- Class: Gastropoda
- Family: Pyramidellidae
- Genus: Turbonilla
- Species: T. louiseae

Binomial name
- Turbonilla louiseae Clarke, 1954

Synonyms
- Pyrgiscus louiseae (Clarke, 1954); Pyrgiscus louisae [sic] (misspelling by Odé & Speers (1972)

Species of gastropod

Turbonilla louiseae is a species of sea snail, a marine gastropod mollusk in the family Pyramidellidae, the pyrams and their allies.

== Description ==
The shell grows to a length of 9 mm.

== Distribution ==
This species occurs in the Atlantic Ocean off Massachusetts, USA, at depths between 95 mm and 99 m.
