= Turbonilla myia =

Scientific classification
- Kingdom: Animalia
- Phylum: Mollusca
- Class: Gastropoda
- Family: Pyramidellidae
- Genus: Turbonilla
- Species: T. myia

Binomial name
- Turbonilla myia Bartsch, 1927

Synonyms
- Pyrgiscus myia (Bartsch, 1927); Turbonilla (Strioturbonilla) myia Bartsch in Dall, 1927 (basionym)

Species of gastropod

Turbonilla myia is a species of sea snail, a marine gastropod mollusk in the family Pyramidellidae, the pyrams and their allies.

== Description ==
The shell grows to a length of 7.9 mm.

== Distribution ==
This species occurs in the Atlantic Ocean off Georgia, USA at a depth of 805 m.
