= Turbonilla mediocris =

Scientific classification
- Kingdom: Animalia
- Phylum: Mollusca
- Class: Gastropoda
- Family: Pyramidellidae
- Genus: Turbonilla
- Species: T. mediocris

Binomial name
- Turbonilla mediocris Peñas & Rolán, 1999

Species of gastropod

Turbonilla mediocris is a species of sea snail, a marine gastropod mollusk in the family Pyramidellidae, the pyrams and their allies.

== Description ==
The shell grows to a length of 3 mm.

== Distribution ==
This marine species occurs in the following locations:

- European waters (ERMS scope)
- Atlantic Ocean: off Senegal.

== Notes ==
Additional information regarding this species:

- Habitat: Known from seamounts and knolls
