= Turbonilla alfredi =

Scientific classification
- Kingdom: Animalia
- Phylum: Mollusca
- Class: Gastropoda
- Family: Pyramidellidae
- Genus: Turbonilla
- Species: T. alfredi

Binomial name
- Turbonilla alfredi Abbott, 1958

Synonyms
- Pyrgiscus alfredi (Abbott, 1958)

Species of gastropod

Turbonilla alfredi is a species of sea snail, a marine gastropod mollusk in the family Pyramidellidae, the pyrams and their allies.

== Description ==
The shell grows to a length of 7.5 mm.

== Distribution ==
This marine species occurs off the Grand Cayman Island, Virgin Islands: St. Croix at depths between 2.4 m and 2.7 m.
