= Turbonilla nodai =

Scientific classification
- Kingdom: Animalia
- Phylum: Mollusca
- Class: Gastropoda
- Family: Pyramidellidae
- Genus: Turbonilla
- Species: T. nodai

Binomial name
- Turbonilla nodai (Robba, Di Geronimo, Chaimanee, Negri & Sanfilippo, 2004)

Synonyms
- Chemnitzia nodai Robba, Di Geronimo, Chaimanee, Negri & Sanfilippo, 2004

Species of gastropod

Turbonilla nodai is a species of sea snail, a marine gastropod mollusc in the family Pyramidellidae, the pyrams and their allies.

== Distribution ==
This marine species occurs in the northern Gulf of Thailand area.
