= Turbonilla mermeroglaphyra =

Scientific classification
- Kingdom: Animalia
- Phylum: Mollusca
- Class: Gastropoda
- Family: Pyramidellidae
- Genus: Turbonilla
- Species: T. mermeroglaphyra

Binomial name
- Turbonilla mermeroglaphyra Silva-Absalao, Dos Santos & De Olivera, 2003

Species of gastropod

Turbonilla mermeroglaphyra is a species of sea snail, a marine gastropod mollusk in the family Pyramidellidae, the pyrams and their allies.

== Description ==
The shell grows to a length of 2.8 mm.

== Distribution ==
This species occurs in the Atlantic Ocean off Brazil at depths between 255 m and 270 m.
