= Turbonilla hespera =

Scientific classification
- Kingdom: Animalia
- Phylum: Mollusca
- Class: Gastropoda
- Family: Pyramidellidae
- Genus: Turbonilla
- Species: T. hespera

Binomial name
- Turbonilla hespera Bartsch, 1927

Synonyms
- Turbonilla (Ptycheulimella) hespera Bartsch, 1927

Species of gastropod

Turbonilla hespera is a species of sea snail, a marine gastropod mollusk in the family Pyramidellidae, the pyrams and their allies.

== Description ==
The shell grows to a length of 5.3 mm.

== Distribution ==
The type specimen was found in the Atlantic Ocean off Georgia, USA, at a depth of 538 m.
