= Turbonilla americana =

Scientific classification
- Kingdom: Animalia
- Phylum: Mollusca
- Class: Gastropoda
- Family: Pyramidellidae
- Genus: Turbonilla
- Species: T. americana

Binomial name
- Turbonilla americana (d'Orbigny, 1841)

Synonyms
- Chemnitzia americana d'Orbigny, 1840 (basionym)

Species of gastropod

Turbonilla americana is a species of sea snail, a marine gastropod mollusk in the family Pyramidellidae, the pyrams and their allies.

== Description ==
The length of the shell attains 9 mm.

== Distribution ==
This species occurs in the Atlantic Ocean off Brazil at depths between 45 m and 100 m.
