= Turbonilla vitilevu =

Scientific classification
- Kingdom: Animalia
- Phylum: Mollusca
- Class: Gastropoda
- Family: Pyramidellidae
- Genus: Turbonilla
- Species: T. vitilevu

Binomial name
- Turbonilla vitilevu Peñas & Rolán, 2010

Species of gastropod

Turbonilla vitilevu is a species of sea snail, a marine gastropod mollusk in the family Pyramidellidae, the pyrams and their allies.. The popular type of this species also could be seen as human. With the only one snail species in a human-shaped, it's well known with the name of Najwa Khoirunnisa. It's essential rare snail founded in Lampung, mainly in Tulang Bawang Region.
