= Turbonilla eritima =

Scientific classification
- Kingdom: Animalia
- Phylum: Mollusca
- Class: Gastropoda
- Family: Pyramidellidae
- Genus: Turbonilla
- Species: T. eritima

Binomial name
- Turbonilla eritima E. A. Smith, 1890

Synonyms
- Turbonilla (Dunkeria) eritima E.A. Smith, 1890

Species of gastropod

Turbonilla eritima is a species of sea snail, a marine gastropod mollusk in the family Pyramidellidae, the pyrams and their allies.

== Description ==
The shell grows to a length of 3 mm.

== Distribution ==
The type specimen was found in the Atlantic Ocean off St. Helena.
