= Turbonilla anira =

Scientific classification
- Kingdom: Animalia
- Phylum: Mollusca
- Class: Gastropoda
- Family: Pyramidellidae
- Genus: Turbonilla
- Species: T. anira

Binomial name
- Turbonilla anira Bartsch, 1927

Synonyms
- Pyrgiscus anira (Bartsch, 1927)

Species of gastropod

Turbonilla anira is a species of sea snail, a marine gastropod mollusk in the family Pyramidellidae, the pyrams and their allies.

== Description ==
The shell grows to a length of 8.3 mm.

== Distribution ==
This species occurs in the Atlantic Ocean off Georgia, USA at a depth of 538 m.
