= Turbonilla miguelgomezi =

Scientific classification
- Kingdom: Animalia
- Phylum: Mollusca
- Class: Gastropoda
- Family: Pyramidellidae
- Genus: Turbonilla
- Species: T. miguelgomezi

Binomial name
- Turbonilla miguelgomezi Peñas & Rolán, 2010

Species of gastropod

Turbonilla miguelgomezi is a species of sea snail, a marine gastropod mollusk in the family 'Pyramidellidae', 'the pyrams' and their allies.

== Description ==
The shell reaches a length of 10 mm.

Their feeding type is parasitic.

== Distribution ==
This species occurs in the Pacific Ocean off the Solomons.
