= Turbonilla capixaba =

Scientific classification
- Kingdom: Animalia
- Phylum: Mollusca
- Class: Gastropoda
- Family: Pyramidellidae
- Genus: Turbonilla
- Species: T. capixaba

Binomial name
- Turbonilla capixaba Pimenta & Absalao, 2004

Species of gastropod

Turbonilla capixaba is a species of sea snail, a marine gastropod mollusk in the family Pyramidellidae, the pyrams and their allies.

== Description ==
The shell grows to a length of 3.8 mm.

== Distribution ==
The type specimen was found in the Atlantic Ocean off Espírito Santo State, Brazil, at depths between 45 m to 71 m.
