= Turbonilla mariajoseae =

Scientific classification
- Kingdom: Animalia
- Phylum: Mollusca
- Class: Gastropoda
- Family: Pyramidellidae
- Genus: Turbonilla
- Species: T. mariajoseae

Binomial name
- Turbonilla mariajoseae Peñas & Rolán, 2010

Species of gastropod

Turbonilla mariajoseae is a species of sea snail, a marine gastropod mollusk in the family Pyramidellidae, the pyrams and their allies.

== Description ==
The shell grows to a length of 2.3 mm, and is coloured white.

== Distribution ==
This species occurs in the Pacific Ocean off the Solomon Islands and Vanuatu.
