= Turbonilla gloriamishimana =

Scientific classification
- Kingdom: Animalia
- Phylum: Mollusca
- Class: Gastropoda
- Family: Pyramidellidae
- Genus: Turbonilla
- Species: T. gloriamishimana

Binomial name
- Turbonilla gloriamishimana Hori & Fukuda, 1999

Species of gastropod

Turbonilla gloriamishimana is a species of small sea snail, a marine gastropod mollusk in the family Pyramidellidae, the pyrams and their allies.

== Description ==
The length of the shell varies between 15 mm and 20 mm.

== Distribution ==
This species occurs in the Pacific Ocean off the Philippines and Japan.
