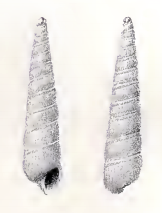
- Apertural and abapertural view of a shell of Turbonilla buttoni

Scientific classification
- Kingdom: Animalia
- Phylum: Mollusca
- Class: Gastropoda
- Family: Pyramidellidae
- Genus: Turbonilla
- Species: T. penasi

Binomial name
- Turbonilla penasi Nofroni & Gubbioli, 2000

= Turbonilla penasi =

Species of gastropod

Turbonilla peans is a species of sea snail, a marine gastropod mollusk in the family Pyramidellidae, the pyrams and their allies.
