= Turbonilla goytacazi =

Scientific classification
- Kingdom: Animalia
- Phylum: Mollusca
- Class: Gastropoda
- Family: Pyramidellidae
- Genus: Turbonilla
- Species: T. goytacazi

Binomial name
- Turbonilla goytacazi Pimenta & Absalao, 2004

Species of gastropod

Turbonilla goytacazi is a species of sea snail, a marine gastropod mollusk in the family Pyramidellidae, the pyrams and their allies.

== Description ==
The shell grows to a length of 6.6 mm.

== Distribution ==
This species occurs in the Atlantic Ocean off Brazil at depths between 100 m and 359 m.
