= Turbonilla lirata =

Scientific classification
- Kingdom: Animalia
- Phylum: Mollusca
- Class: Gastropoda
- Family: Pyramidellidae
- Genus: Turbonilla
- Species: T. lirata

Binomial name
- Turbonilla lirata (A. Adams, 1855)

Synonyms
- Turbonilla kahoolawensis Pilsbry, 1918; Turbonilla kauaiensis Pilsbry, 1918; Turbonilla oblectamentum Pilsbry, 1918

Species of gastropod

Turbonilla lirata is a species of sea snail, a marine gastropod mollusk in the family Pyramidellidae, the pyrams and their allies.
