= Turbonilla fustis =

Scientific classification
- Kingdom: Animalia
- Phylum: Mollusca
- Class: Gastropoda
- Family: Pyramidellidae
- Genus: Turbonilla
- Species: T. fustis

Binomial name
- Turbonilla fustis Odé, 1995

Species of gastropod

Turbonilla fustis is a species of sea snail, a marine gastropod mollusk in the family Pyramidellidae, the pyrams and their allies.

== Description ==
The shell grows to a length of 3.2 mm.

== Distribution ==
This species occurs in the following locations at depths between 42 m and 128 m:

- Gulf of Mexico: Louisiana, Texas
