= Turbonilla guerrai =

Scientific classification
- Kingdom: Animalia
- Phylum: Mollusca
- Class: Gastropoda
- Family: Pyramidellidae
- Genus: Turbonilla
- Species: T. guerrai

Binomial name
- Turbonilla guerrai Peñas & Rolán, 2010

Species of gastropod

Turbonilla guerrai is a species of sea snail, a marine gastropod mollusk in the family Pyramidellidae, the pyrams and their allies.

== Description ==
The length of the shell varies between 6 mm and 11 mm.

== Distribution ==
This species occurs in the Pacific Ocean off the Loyalty Islands and Fiji.
