= Turbonilla kamayura =

Scientific classification
- Kingdom: Animalia
- Phylum: Mollusca
- Class: Gastropoda
- Family: Pyramidellidae
- Genus: Turbonilla
- Species: T. kamayura

Binomial name
- Turbonilla kamayura Silva-Absalao, Dos Santos & De Olivera, 2003

Species of gastropod

Turbonilla kamayura is a species of sea snail, a marine gastropod mollusk in the family Pyramidellidae, the pyrams and their allies.

== Description ==
The shell grows to a length of 4 mm.

== Distribution ==
This species occurs in the Atlantic Ocean off Brazil.
