= Turbonilla kuraenohamana =

Scientific classification
- Kingdom: Animalia
- Phylum: Mollusca
- Class: Gastropoda
- Family: Pyramidellidae
- Genus: Turbonilla
- Species: T. kuraenohamana

Binomial name
- Turbonilla kuraenohamana Hori & Fukuda, 1999

Species of gastropod

Turbonilla kuraenohamana is a species of sea snail, a marine gastropod mollusk in the family Pyramidellidae, the pyrams and their allies.

== Description ==
The shell grows to a length of 6 mm.

== Distribution ==
This marine species occurs off Japan and the Philippines.
