= Turbonilla loboi =

Scientific classification
- Kingdom: Animalia
- Phylum: Mollusca
- Class: Gastropoda
- Family: Pyramidellidae
- Genus: Turbonilla
- Species: T. loboi

Binomial name
- Turbonilla loboi Peñas & Rolán, 2010

Species of gastropod

Turbonilla loboi is a species of sea snail, a marine gastropod mollusk in the family Pyramidellidae, the pyrams and their allies.

== Description ==
The length of the shell varies between 5.5 mm and 7.5 mm.

== Distribution ==
This marine species occurs off New Caledonia and the Solomon Islands.
