= Turbonilla candida =

Scientific classification
- Kingdom: Animalia
- Phylum: Mollusca
- Class: Gastropoda
- Family: Pyramidellidae
- Genus: Turbonilla
- Species: T. candida

Binomial name
- Turbonilla candida (A. Adams, 1855)

Synonyms
- Chemnitzia candida A. Adams, 1855; Turbonilla multigyrata Dunker, 1882

Species of gastropod

Turbonilla candida is a species of sea snail, a marine gastropod mollusk in the family Pyramidellidae, the pyrams and their allies.

== Distribution ==
This marine species occurs off South Africa.
