= Turbonilla joelleae =

Scientific classification
- Kingdom: Animalia
- Phylum: Mollusca
- Class: Gastropoda
- Family: Pyramidellidae
- Genus: Turbonilla
- Species: T. joelleae

Binomial name
- Turbonilla joelleae Peñas & Rolán, 2010

Species of gastropod

Turbonilla joelleae is a species of sea snail, a marine gastropod mollusk in the family Pyramidellidae, the pyrams and their allies.

== Description ==
The shell grows to a length of 5.5 mm.

== Distribution ==
This marine species occurs off New Caledonia and the Solomons.
