= Turbonilla grippi =

Scientific classification
- Kingdom: Animalia
- Phylum: Mollusca
- Class: Gastropoda
- Family: Pyramidellidae
- Genus: Turbonilla
- Species: T. grippi

Binomial name
- Turbonilla grippi Bartsch, 1912

Synonyms
- Turbonilla (Pyrgiscus) grippi Bartsch, 1912

Species of gastropod

Turbonilla grippi, which is a species of sea snail, is a marine gastropod mollusk in the family Pyramidellidae.

== Distribution ==
This species occurs in the Pacific Ocean off San Diego, California.
