= Turbonilla martae =

Scientific classification
- Kingdom: Animalia
- Phylum: Mollusca
- Class: Gastropoda
- Family: Pyramidellidae
- Genus: Turbonilla
- Species: T. martae

Binomial name
- Turbonilla martae Peñas & Rolán, 1997

Species of gastropod

Turbonilla martae is a species of sea snail, a marine gastropod mollusk in the family Pyramidellidae, the pyrams and their allies.

== Description ==
The shell grows to a length of 10 mm.

== Distribution ==
This species occurs in the Atlantic Ocean from the Western Sahara to Angola.
