= Turbonilla liufaui =

Scientific classification
- Kingdom: Animalia
- Phylum: Mollusca
- Class: Gastropoda
- Family: Pyramidellidae
- Genus: Turbonilla
- Species: T. liufaui

Binomial name
- Turbonilla liufaui Peñas & Rolán, 2010

Species of gastropod

Turbonilla liufaui is a species of sea snail, a marine gastropod mollusk in the family Pyramidellidae, the pyrams and their allies.

== Description ==
The length of the shell measures 1.6 mm.

== Distribution ==
This marine shell occurs off the Solomon Islands.
