= Turbonilla leuca =

Scientific classification
- Kingdom: Animalia
- Phylum: Mollusca
- Class: Gastropoda
- Family: Pyramidellidae
- Genus: Turbonilla
- Species: T. leuca

Binomial name
- Turbonilla leuca Bush, 1899

Species of gastropod

Turbonilla leuca is a species of sea snail, a marine gastropod mollusk in the family Pyramidellidae, the pyrams and their allies.

== Description ==
The length of the shell measures 4.5 mm.

== Distribution ==
This species occurs in the Atlantic Ocean off the Bermudas.
