= Turbonilla singularis =

Scientific classification
- Kingdom: Animalia
- Phylum: Mollusca
- Class: Gastropoda
- Family: Pyramidellidae
- Genus: Turbonilla
- Species: T. singularis

Binomial name
- Turbonilla singularis Peñas & Rolán, 2010

Species of gastropod

Turbonilla singularis is a species of sea snail, a marine gastropod mollusk in the family Pyramidellidae.

== Description ==
The length of the shell attains 3.6 mm.

== Distribution ==
This marine species occurs in the Pacific Ocean off the Fiji Islands.
