= Turbonilla isabelitae =

Scientific classification
- Kingdom: Animalia
- Phylum: Mollusca
- Class: Gastropoda
- Family: Pyramidellidae
- Genus: Turbonilla
- Species: T. isabelitae

Binomial name
- Turbonilla isabelitae Peñas & Rolán, 2000

Species of gastropod

Turbonilla isabelitae is a species of sea snail, a marine gastropod mollusk in the family Pyramidellidae, the pyrams and their allies.

== Distribution ==
This species occurs off the Canary Islands and Atlantic Morocco.
