= Turbonilla jozinae =

Scientific classification
- Kingdom: Animalia
- Phylum: Mollusca
- Class: Gastropoda
- Family: Pyramidellidae
- Genus: Turbonilla
- Species: T. jozinae

Binomial name
- Turbonilla jozinae van Aartsen & Corgan, 1996

Synonyms
- Turbonilla tenuis W.H. Turton, 1932

Species of gastropod

Turbonilla jozinae is a species of sea snail, a marine gastropod mollusk in the family Pyramidellidae, the pyrams and their allies.
