= Turbonilla nesiotes =

Scientific classification
- Kingdom: Animalia
- Phylum: Mollusca
- Class: Gastropoda
- Family: Pyramidellidae
- Genus: Turbonilla
- Species: T. nesiotes

Binomial name
- Turbonilla nesiotes Pimenta & Absalão, 1998

Synonyms
- Turbonilla abrupta Clessin, 1902

Species of gastropod

Turbonilla nesiotes is a species of sea snail, a marine gastropod mollusk in the family Pyramidellidae, the pyramids and their allies.
