= Turbonilla luandensis =

Scientific classification
- Kingdom: Animalia
- Phylum: Mollusca
- Class: Gastropoda
- Family: Pyramidellidae
- Genus: Turbonilla
- Species: T. luandensis

Binomial name
- Turbonilla luandensis Peñas & Rolán, 1997

Species of gastropod

Turbonilla luandensis is a species of sea snail, a marine gastropod mollusk in the family Pyramidellidae, the pyrams and their allies.

== Distribution ==
This species occurs in the Atlantic Ocean off Angola.
