= Turbonilla bayensis =

Scientific classification
- Kingdom: Animalia
- Phylum: Mollusca
- Class: Gastropoda
- Family: Pyramidellidae
- Genus: Turbonilla
- Species: T. bayensis

Binomial name
- Turbonilla bayensis van Aartsen & Corgan, 1996

Synonyms
- Turbonilla planulata Thiele, 1930

Species of gastropod

Turbonilla bayensis is a species of sea snail, a marine gastropod mollusk in the family Pyramidellidae, the pyrams and their allies.
