= Turbonilla modesta =

Scientific classification
- Kingdom: Animalia
- Phylum: Mollusca
- Class: Gastropoda
- Family: Pyramidellidae
- Genus: Turbonilla
- Species: T. modesta

Binomial name
- Turbonilla modesta (d'Orbigny, 1841)

Synonyms
- Chemnitzia modesta (d'Orbigny, 1841)

Species of gastropod

Turbonilla modesta is a species of sea snail, a marine gastropod mollusk in the family Pyramidellidae, the pyrams and their allies.
