= Turbonilla zulmae =

Scientific classification
- Kingdom: Animalia
- Phylum: Mollusca
- Class: Gastropoda
- Family: Pyramidellidae
- Genus: Turbonilla
- Species: T. zulmae

Binomial name
- Turbonilla zulmae Pimenta & Absalão, 1998

Synonyms
- Turbonilla elongata Castellanos, 1982

Species of gastropod

Turbonilla zulmae is a species of sea snail, a marine gastropod mollusk in the family Pyramidellidae, the pyrams and their allies.
