= Turbonilla lordii =

Scientific classification
- Kingdom: Animalia
- Phylum: Mollusca
- Class: Gastropoda
- Family: Pyramidellidae
- Genus: Turbonilla
- Species: T. lordii

Binomial name
- Turbonilla lordii (E. A. Smith, 1880)

Synonyms
- Turbonilla lordi (E. A. Smith, 1880)

Species of gastropod

Turbonilla lordii is a species of sea snail, a marine gastropod mollusk in the family Pyramidellidae, the pyrams and their allies.
