= Turbonilla peilei =

Scientific classification
- Kingdom: Animalia
- Phylum: Mollusca
- Class: Gastropoda
- Family: Pyramidellidae
- Genus: Turbonilla
- Species: T. peilei

Binomial name
- Turbonilla peilei Dall & Bartsch, 1911

Synonyms
- Turbonilla subulata (C. B. Adams, 1850)

Species of gastropod

Turbonilla peilei is a species of sea snail, a marine gastropod mollusk in the family Pyramidellidae, the pyrams and their allies.
