= Turbonilla oceanica =

Scientific classification
- Kingdom: Animalia
- Phylum: Mollusca
- Class: Gastropoda
- Family: Pyramidellidae
- Genus: Turbonilla
- Species: T. oceanica

Binomial name
- Turbonilla oceanica Oliver, 1915

Species of gastropod

Turbonilla oceanica is a species of sea snail, a marine gastropod mollusk in the family Pyramidellidae, the pyrams and their allies.

== Distribution ==
This marine species occurs off the Kermadec Islands.
