= Turbonilla cornea =

Scientific classification
- Kingdom: Animalia
- Phylum: Mollusca
- Class: Gastropoda
- Family: Pyramidellidae
- Genus: Turbonilla
- Species: T. cornea

Binomial name
- Turbonilla cornea (A. Adams, 1853)

Synonyms
- Chemnitzia cornea A. Adams, 1853

Species of gastropod

Turbonilla cornea is a species of sea snail, a marine gastropod mollusk in the family Pyramidellidae, the pyrams and their allies.
