= Turbonilla punicea =

Scientific classification
- Kingdom: Animalia
- Phylum: Mollusca
- Class: Gastropoda
- Family: Pyramidellidae
- Genus: Turbonilla
- Species: T. punicea

Binomial name
- Turbonilla punicea Dall, 1884

Species of gastropod

Turbonilla punicea is a species of sea snail, a marine gastropod mollusk in the family Pyramidellidae, the pyrams and their allies.

== Distribution ==
This species occurs in the following locations:

- Gulf of Mexico
