= Turbonilla virgulinoi =

Scientific classification
- Kingdom: Animalia
- Phylum: Mollusca
- Class: Gastropoda
- Family: Pyramidellidae
- Genus: Turbonilla
- Species: T. virgulinoi

Binomial name
- Turbonilla virgulinoi Silva-Absalao, Dos Santos & De Olivera, 2003

Species of gastropod

Turbonilla virgulinoi is a species of sea snail, a marine gastropod mollusk in the family Pyramidellidae, the pyrams and their allies.
