= Turbonilla hofmani =

Scientific classification
- Kingdom: Animalia
- Phylum: Mollusca
- Class: Gastropoda
- Family: Pyramidellidae
- Genus: Turbonilla
- Species: T. hofmani

Binomial name
- Turbonilla hofmani Angas, 1877

Synonyms
- Turbonilla nitida Angas, 1867

Species of gastropod

Turbonilla hofmani is a species of sea snail, a marine gastropod mollusk in the family Pyramidellidae, the pyrams and their allies.
