= Turbonilla secura =

Scientific classification
- Kingdom: Animalia
- Phylum: Mollusca
- Class: Gastropoda
- Family: Pyramidellidae
- Genus: Turbonilla
- Species: T. secura

Binomial name
- Turbonilla secura Dall & Bartsch, 1906

Synonyms
- Turbonilla obeliscus Gould, 1861

Species of gastropod

Turbonilla secura is a species of sea snail, a marine gastropod mollusk in the family Pyramidellidae, the pyrams and their allies.
