= Turbonilla flaianoi =

Scientific classification
- Kingdom: Animalia
- Phylum: Mollusca
- Class: Gastropoda
- Family: Pyramidellidae
- Genus: Turbonilla
- Species: T. flaianoi

Binomial name
- Turbonilla flaianoi Mazziotti, Agamennone, Micali & Tisselli, 2006

Species of gastropod

Turbonilla flaianoi is a species of sea snail, a marine gastropod mollusk in the family Pyramidellidae, the pyrams and their allies.
