= Turbonilla encella =

Scientific classification
- Kingdom: Animalia
- Phylum: Mollusca
- Class: Gastropoda
- Family: Pyramidellidae
- Genus: Turbonilla
- Species: T. encella

Binomial name
- Turbonilla encella Bartsch, 1912

Species of gastropod

Turbonilla encella is a species of sea snail, a marine gastropod mollusk in the family Pyramidellidae, the pyrams and their allies.

== Distribution ==
This species occurs in the Pacific Ocean off California.
