= Turbonilla fackenthallae =

Scientific classification
- Kingdom: Animalia
- Phylum: Mollusca
- Class: Gastropoda
- Family: Pyramidellidae
- Genus: Turbonilla
- Species: T. fackenthallae

Binomial name
- Turbonilla fackenthallae Smith & Gordon, 1948

Species of gastropod

Turbonilla fackenthallae is a species of sea snail, a marine gastropod mollusk in the family Pyramidellidae, the pyrams and their allies.
