= Turbonilla antestriata =

Scientific classification
- Kingdom: Animalia
- Phylum: Mollusca
- Class: Gastropoda
- Family: Pyramidellidae
- Genus: Turbonilla
- Species: T. antestriata

Binomial name
- Turbonilla antestriata Dall & Bartsch, 1907

Species of gastropod

Turbonilla antestriata is a species of sea snail, a marine gastropod mollusk in the family Pyramidellidae, the pyramids and their allies.
