= Turbonilla araceliae =

Scientific classification
- Kingdom: Animalia
- Phylum: Mollusca
- Class: Gastropoda
- Family: Pyramidellidae
- Genus: Turbonilla
- Species: T. araceliae

Binomial name
- Turbonilla araceliae Peñas & Rolán, 2010

Species of gastropod

Turbonilla araceliae is a species of sea snail, a marine gastropod mollusk in the family Pyramidellidae, the pyrams and their allies.
