= Turbonilla finlayi =

Scientific classification
- Kingdom: Animalia
- Phylum: Mollusca
- Class: Gastropoda
- Family: Pyramidellidae
- Genus: Turbonilla
- Species: T. finlayi

Binomial name
- Turbonilla finlayi A. W. B. Powell, 1926

Species of gastropod

Turbonilla finlayi is a species of sea snail, a marine gastropod mollusk in the family Pyramidellidae, the pyrams and their allies.
