= Turbonilla larranagai =

Scientific classification
- Kingdom: Animalia
- Phylum: Mollusca
- Class: Gastropoda
- Family: Pyramidellidae
- Genus: Turbonilla
- Species: T. larranagai

Binomial name
- Turbonilla larranagai Peñas & Rolán, 2010

Species of gastropod

Turbonilla larranagai is a species of sea snail, a marine gastropod mollusk in the family Pyramidellidae, the pyrams and their allies.
