= Turbonilla redondoensis =

Scientific classification
- Kingdom: Animalia
- Phylum: Mollusca
- Class: Gastropoda
- Family: Pyramidellidae
- Genus: Turbonilla
- Species: T. redondoensis

Binomial name
- Turbonilla redondoensis Bartsch, 1917

Species of gastropod

Turbonilla redondoensis is a species of sea snail, a marine gastropod mollusk in the family Pyramidellidae, the pyrams and their allies.
