= Turbonilla annettae =

Scientific classification
- Kingdom: Animalia
- Phylum: Mollusca
- Class: Gastropoda
- Family: Pyramidellidae
- Genus: Turbonilla
- Species: T. annettae

Binomial name
- Turbonilla annettae Dall & Bartsch, 1909

Species of gastropod

Turbonilla annettae is a species of sea snail, a marine gastropod mollusk in the family Pyramidellidae, the pyrams and their allies.
