= Turbonilla bathybius =

Scientific classification
- Kingdom: Animalia
- Phylum: Mollusca
- Class: Gastropoda
- Family: Pyramidellidae
- Genus: Turbonilla
- Species: T. bathybius

Binomial name
- Turbonilla bathybius Barnard, 1963

Species of gastropod

Turbonilla bathybius is a species of sea snail, a marine gastropod mollusk in the family Pyramidellidae, the pyrams and their allies.
