= Turbonilla strebeli =

Scientific classification
- Kingdom: Animalia
- Phylum: Mollusca
- Class: Gastropoda
- Family: Pyramidellidae
- Genus: Turbonilla
- Species: T. strebeli

Binomial name
- Turbonilla strebeli Corgan, 1969

Species of gastropod

Turbonilla strebeli is a species of sea snail, a marine gastropod mollusc in the family Pyramidellidae, the pyrams and their allies.
