= Turbonilla cora =

Scientific classification
- Kingdom: Animalia
- Phylum: Mollusca
- Class: Gastropoda
- Family: Pyramidellidae
- Genus: Turbonilla
- Species: T. cora

Binomial name
- Turbonilla cora (d'Orbigny, 1840)

Species of gastropod

Turbonilla cora is a species of sea snail, a marine gastropod mollusk in the family Pyramidellidae, the pyrams and their allies.
