= Turbonilla scitula =

Scientific classification
- Kingdom: Animalia
- Phylum: Mollusca
- Class: Gastropoda
- Family: Pyramidellidae
- Genus: Turbonilla
- Species: T. scitula

Binomial name
- Turbonilla scitula A. Adams, 1861

Species of gastropod

Turbonilla scitula is a species of sea snail, a marine gastropod mollusk in the family Pyramidellidae, the pyrams and their allies.
