= Turbonilla ata =

Scientific classification
- Kingdom: Animalia
- Phylum: Mollusca
- Class: Gastropoda
- Family: Pyramidellidae
- Genus: Turbonilla
- Species: T. ata

Binomial name
- Turbonilla ata Bartsch, 1926

Species of gastropod

Turbonilla ata is a species of sea snail, a marine gastropod mollusk belonging to the family Pyramidellidae, the pyrams and their allies.
