= Crassispira jamaicense =

Scientific classification
- Kingdom: Animalia
- Phylum: Mollusca
- Class: Gastropoda
- Subclass: Caenogastropoda
- Order: Neogastropoda
- Superfamily: Conoidea
- Family: Pseudomelatomidae
- Genus: Crassispira
- Species: C. jamaicense

Binomial name
- Crassispira jamaicense (Guppy, 1866)

Synonyms
- † Crassispira (Crassispirella) jamaicensisGuppy, 1866; Drillia jamaicense(Guppy, 1866); Pleurotoma (Drillia) jamaicenseGuppy, 1866; Pleurotoma jamaicenseGuppy, 1866

Extinct species of gastropod

Crassispira jamaicense is an extinct species of sea snail, a marine gastropod mollusk in the family Pseudomelatomidae, the turrids and allies. Fossils have been found in Jamaica.
