= Crassispira seiuncta =

Scientific classification
- Kingdom: Animalia
- Phylum: Mollusca
- Class: Gastropoda
- Subclass: Caenogastropoda
- Order: Neogastropoda
- Superfamily: Conoidea
- Family: Pseudomelatomidae
- Genus: Crassispira
- Species: C. seiuncta

Binomial name
- Crassispira seiuncta (L.M.D. Bellardi, 1877 )

Synonyms
- Drillia seiuncta Bellardi, 1877

Extinct species of gastropod

Crassispira seiuncta is an extinct species of sea snail, a marine gastropod mollusk in the family Pseudomelatomidae, the turrids and allies.

== Description ==
The length of the shell attains 40 mm.

== Distribution ==
Fossils have been found in Pliocene strata in Piemonte, Italy.
