= Crassispira danjouxii =

Scientific classification
- Kingdom: Animalia
- Phylum: Mollusca
- Class: Gastropoda
- Subclass: Caenogastropoda
- Order: Neogastropoda
- Superfamily: Conoidea
- Family: Pseudomelatomidae
- Genus: Crassispira
- Species: C. danjouxii

Binomial name
- Crassispira danjouxii (Baudon, 1853)

Synonyms
- † Crassispira (Tripia) danjouxii (Baudon, 1853); † Pleurotoma danjouxii Baudon, 1853 (original combination)

Extinct species of gastropod

Crassispira danjouxii is an extinct species of sea snail, a marine gastropod mollusk in the family Pseudomelatomidae, the turrids and allies.

== Distribution ==
Fossils have been found in Eocene strata in the Ile-de-France, France.
