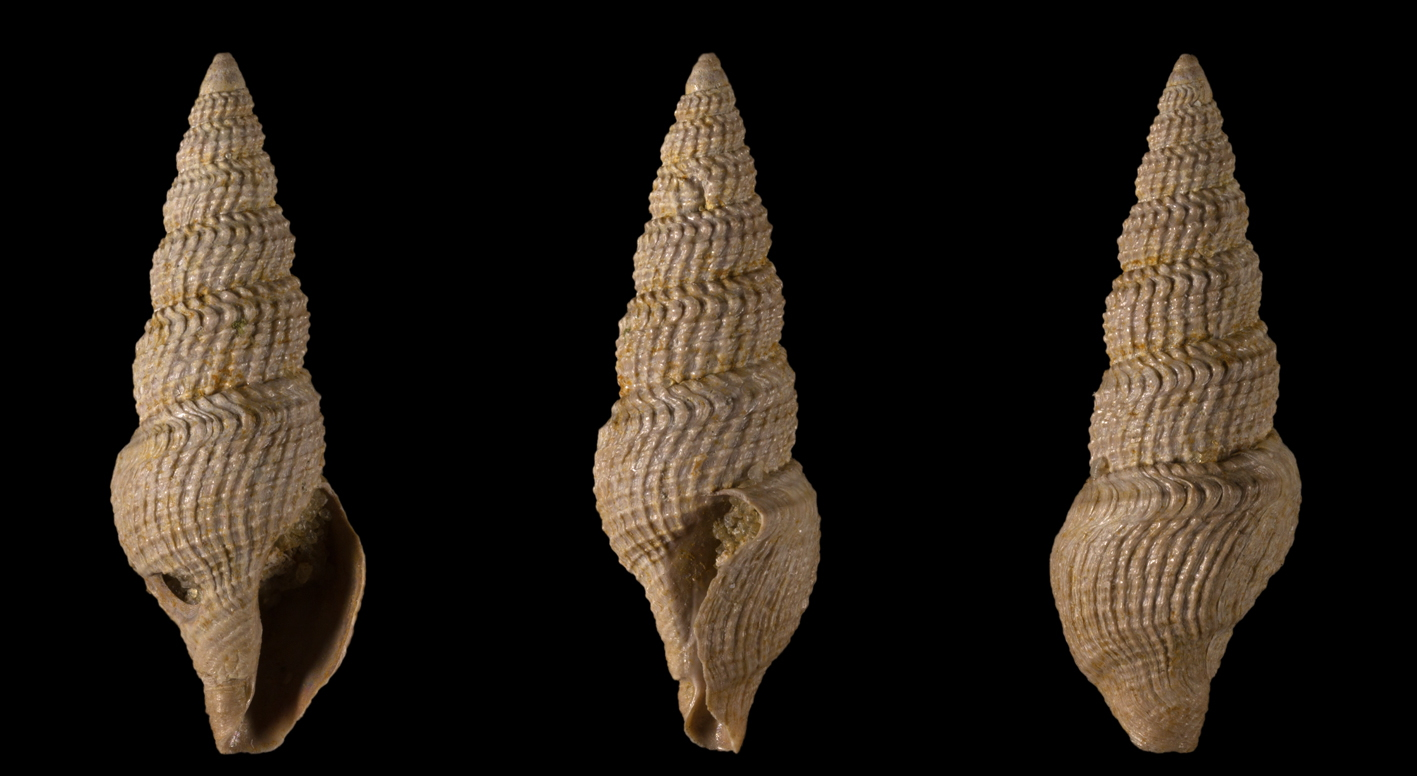
- Shell of Crassispira girgillus (syntype at MNHN, Paris)

Scientific classification
- Kingdom: Animalia
- Phylum: Mollusca
- Class: Gastropoda
- Subclass: Caenogastropoda
- Order: Neogastropoda
- Superfamily: Conoidea
- Family: Pseudomelatomidae
- Genus: Crassispira
- Species: C. girgillus

Binomial name
- Crassispira girgillus (Dollfus, 1899)

Synonyms
- Crassispira (Tripia) girgillus (Dollfus, 1899); Drillia (Crassispira) granulata clathrata Cossmann, 1889; Drillia (Tripia) clathrata Cossmann, 1889

= Crassispira girgillus =

Extinct species of gastropod

Crassispira girgillus is an extinct species of sea snail, a marine gastropod mollusk in the family Pseudomelatomidae, the turrids and allies.

== Distribution ==
Fossils have been found in Eocene strata in Ile-de-France, France
