= Crassispira rhythmica =

Scientific classification
- Kingdom: Animalia
- Phylum: Mollusca
- Class: Gastropoda
- Subclass: Caenogastropoda
- Order: Neogastropoda
- Superfamily: Conoidea
- Family: Pseudomelatomidae
- Genus: Crassispira
- Species: C. rhythmica

Binomial name
- Crassispira rhythmica Melvill, 1927

Species of gastropod

Crassispira rhythmica is a species of sea snail, a marine gastropod mollusk in the family Pseudomelatomidae. The species was first described by James Cosmo Melvill in 1927.

== Description ==
The length of the shell attains 15 mm.

== Distribution ==
This marine species occurs off Florida, United States; and Barbados.
