= Crassispira safagaensis =

Scientific classification
- Kingdom: Animalia
- Phylum: Mollusca
- Class: Gastropoda
- Subclass: Caenogastropoda
- Order: Neogastropoda
- Superfamily: Conoidea
- Family: Pseudomelatomidae
- Genus: Crassispira
- Species: C. safagaensis

Binomial name
- Crassispira safagaensis Rolan & Fernandes, 1992

Species of sea snail

Crassispira safagaensis is a species of sea snail, a marine gastropod mollusc in the family Pseudomelatomidae.

== Description ==
The length of the shell attains 16 mm.

== Distribution ==
This marine species occurs in the Red Sea.
