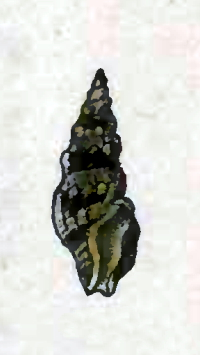
- Apertural view of a shell of Crassispira hondurasensis

Scientific classification
- Kingdom: Animalia
- Phylum: Mollusca
- Class: Gastropoda
- Subclass: Caenogastropoda
- Order: Neogastropoda
- Superfamily: Conoidea
- Family: Pseudomelatomidae
- Genus: Crassispira
- Species: C. hondurasensis

Binomial name
- Crassispira hondurasensis (Reeve, 1846)

Synonyms
- Drillia hondurasensis (Reeve, 1846)

= Crassispira hondurasensis =

Species of gastropod

Crassispira hondurasensis is a species of sea snail, a marine gastropod mollusk in the family Pseudomelatomidae.

== Description ==
The length of the shell attains 8 mm.

The whorls are nodosely ribbed, with revolving striae, and a smooth space below the sutures. it is alternately banded with yellow and ash-color.

== Distribution ==
This marine species occurs off Honduras
