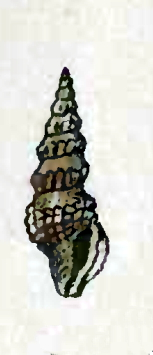
- Apertural view of a shell of Crassispira semigranosa

Scientific classification
- Kingdom: Animalia
- Phylum: Mollusca
- Class: Gastropoda
- Subclass: Caenogastropoda
- Order: Neogastropoda
- Superfamily: Conoidea
- Family: Pseudomelatomidae
- Genus: Crassispira
- Species: C. semigranosa

Binomial name
- Crassispira semigranosa (Reeve, 1846)

Synonyms
- Clathurella semigranosa (Reeve, 1846)

= Crassispira semigranosa =

Species of gastropod

Crassispira semigranosa is a species of sea snail, a marine gastropod mollusk in the family Pseudomelatomidae.

== Description ==
The length of the shell attains 17 mm.

The whorls are concave round the upper part, nodosely ribbed in the middle and granulated beneath. They are whitish, encircled round the lower part with an orange band.

== Distribution ==
This marine species occurs off the Virgin Islands, the Grenadines and off Brazil
