= Crassispira kachhensis =

Scientific classification
- Kingdom: Animalia
- Phylum: Mollusca
- Class: Gastropoda
- Subclass: Caenogastropoda
- Order: Neogastropoda
- Superfamily: Conoidea
- Family: Pseudomelatomidae
- Genus: Crassispira
- Species: C. kachhensis

Binomial name
- Crassispira kachhensis (Vredenburg 1925)

Synonyms
- † Drillia (Crassispira) kachhensis Vredenburg 1925; * † Drillia kachhensis Vredenburg 1925

Extinct species of gastropod

Crassispira kachhensis is an extinct species of sea snail, a marine gastropod mollusk in the family Pseudomelatomidae, the turrids and allies.

== Description ==
The length of the shell attains 11.5 mm, its diameter 4 mm.

== Distribution ==
Fossils have been found in Miocene strata of Gujarat, India and in Pakistan; age range: 20.43 to 15.97 Ma
