= Crassispira latizonata =

Scientific classification
- Kingdom: Animalia
- Phylum: Mollusca
- Class: Gastropoda
- Subclass: Caenogastropoda
- Order: Neogastropoda
- Superfamily: Conoidea
- Family: Pseudomelatomidae
- Genus: Crassispira
- Species: C. latizonata

Binomial name
- Crassispira latizonata (E.A. Smith, 1882)

Synonyms
- Crassispira bandata (Nowell-Usticke, 1971); Drillia bandata Nowell-Usticke, 1971 (Invalid: unnecessary replacement name for Drillia virgata Nowell-Usticke, 1969, incorrectly assumed to be preoccupied); Drillia ponciana var. virgata Nowell-Usticke, 1969; Pleurotoma l(Crassispira) atizonata E.A. Smith, 1882 (original combination)

Species of gastropod

Crassispira latizonata is a species of sea snail, a marine gastropod mollusk in the family Pseudomelatomidae.

== Description ==
The length of the shell attains 9 mm, its diameter 3.5 mm.

The solid, acuminate, ovate shell contains 8 whorls. The general aspect of the surface of this shell is granulous, but on closer examination the upper third part of each whorl is found to exhibit only the longitudinal ribs, which are suddenly directed obliquely to the left. The white band occupies about half the whorl, and includes the four upper series of granules. The transverse striation is fine and most easily seen on the upper part of the whorls.

== Distribution ==
This species occurs in the Caribbean Sea and the Lesser Antilles; also off Brazil.
