= Crassispira cortezi =

Scientific classification
- Kingdom: Animalia
- Phylum: Mollusca
- Class: Gastropoda
- Subclass: Caenogastropoda
- Order: Neogastropoda
- Superfamily: Conoidea
- Family: Pseudomelatomidae
- Genus: Crassispira
- Species: C. cortezi

Binomial name
- Crassispira cortezi Shasky & Campbell, 1964

Synonyms
- Crassiclava cortezi Shasky & Campbell, 1964

Species of gastropod

Crassispira cortezi is a species of sea snail, a marine gastropod mollusk in the family Pseudomelatomidae.

== Description ==
The length of the shell attains 32.4 mm.

== Distribution ==
This species occurs in the Pacific Ocean from Mexico to Peru.
