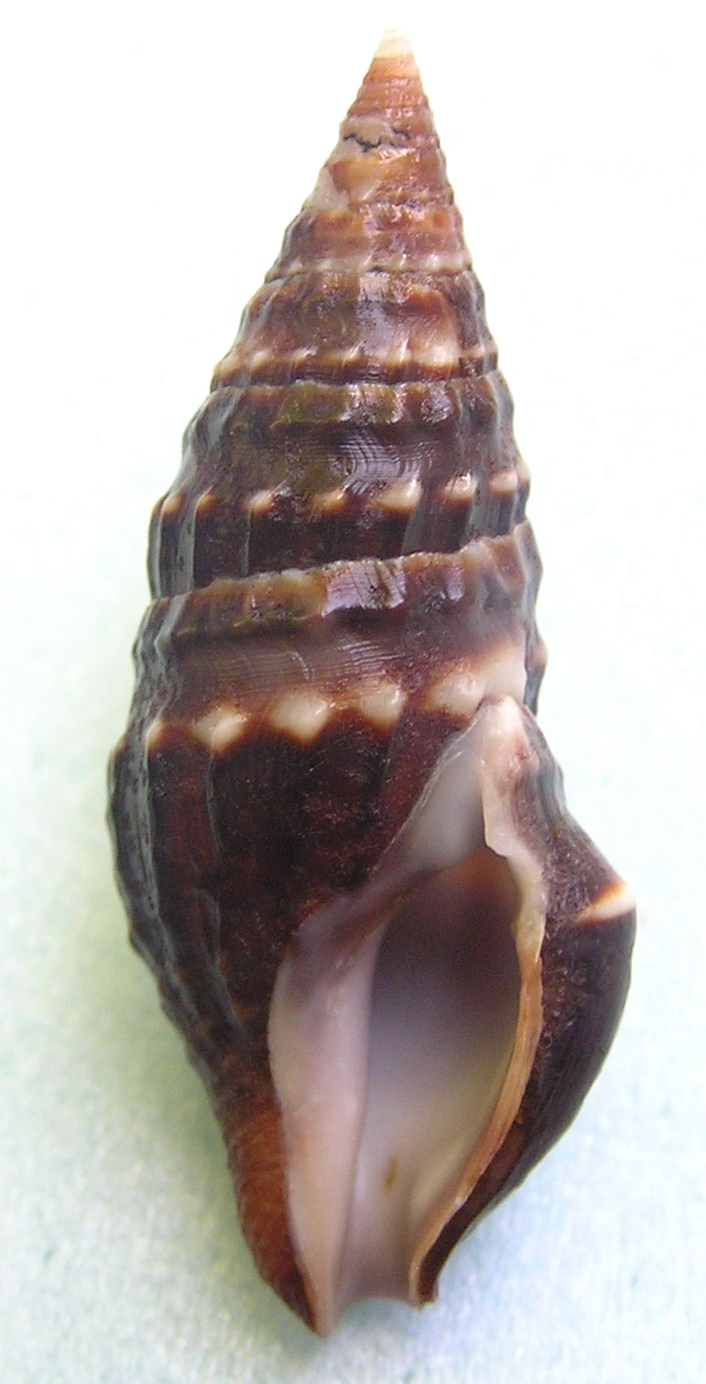
- Apertural view of a shell of Crassispira harfordiana

Scientific classification
- Kingdom: Animalia
- Phylum: Mollusca
- Class: Gastropoda
- Subclass: Caenogastropoda
- Order: Neogastropoda
- Superfamily: Conoidea
- Family: Pseudomelatomidae
- Genus: Crassispira
- Species: C. harfordiana

Binomial name
- Crassispira harfordiana (Reeve, 1843)

Synonyms
- Crassispira adamsiana Pilsbry & Lowe, 1932; Crassispira hardfordiana Reeve, 1843; Glossispira harfordiana (Reeve, L.A., 1843); Pleurotoma harfordiana Reeve, 1843

= Crassispira harfordiana =

Species of gastropod

Crassispira harfordiana is a species of sea snail, a marine gastropod mollusk in the family Pseudomelatomidae.

== Description ==
The length of the shell varies between 30 mm and 40 mm.

The whorls show a narrow yellowish band on the periphery.

== Distribution ==
This marine species occurs off Cuba and Panama.
