= Crassispira conica =

Scientific classification
- Kingdom: Animalia
- Phylum: Mollusca
- Class: Gastropoda
- Subclass: Caenogastropoda
- Order: Neogastropoda
- Superfamily: Conoidea
- Family: Pseudomelatomidae
- Genus: Crassispira
- Species: C. conica

Binomial name
- Crassispira conica Jung, 1965

Extinct species of gastropod

Crassispira conica is an extinct species of sea snail, a marine gastropod mollusk in the family Pseudomelatomidae, the turrids and allies. The length of the shell attains 48 mm. Fossils have been found in Miocene strata in Colombia and Venezuela; age range: 15.97 to 13.65 Ma.
