= Crassispira maonisriparum =

Scientific classification
- Kingdom: Animalia
- Phylum: Mollusca
- Class: Gastropoda
- Subclass: Caenogastropoda
- Order: Neogastropoda
- Superfamily: Conoidea
- Family: Pseudomelatomidae
- Genus: Crassispira
- Species: C. maonisriparum

Binomial name
- Crassispira maonisriparum (Maury 1917)

Synonyms
- † Crassispira (Crassispirella) maonisriparum (Maury 1917); † Drillia maonisriparum C.J. Maury, 1917

Extinct species of gastropod

Crassispira maonisriparum is an extinct species of sea snail, a marine gastropod mollusk in the family Pseudomelatomidae, the turrids and allies.

== Description ==
The length of the shell attains 9.5 mm, its diameter 4 mm.

== Distribution ==
Fossils have been found in Miocene strata of the Dominican Republic and Venezuela: age range: 11.608 to 7.246 Ma.
