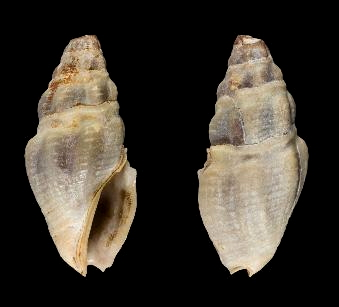
- Shell of Crassispira pseudocarbonaria (holotype in MNHN, Paris)

Scientific classification
- Kingdom: Animalia
- Phylum: Mollusca
- Class: Gastropoda
- Subclass: Caenogastropoda
- Order: Neogastropoda
- Superfamily: Conoidea
- Family: Pseudomelatomidae
- Genus: Crassispira
- Species: C. pseudocarbonaria

Binomial name
- Crassispira pseudocarbonaria Nolf, 2009

= Crassispira pseudocarbonaria =

Species of gastropod

Crassispira pseudocarbonaria is a species of sea snail, a marine gastropod mollusc in the family Pseudomelatomidae.

== Description ==
The length of the shell attains 26 mm.

== Distribution ==
This marine species occurs in the Gulf of Guinea, West Africa.
