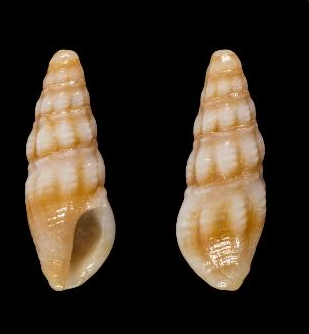
- Shell of Crassispira soamanitraensis (holotype in MNHN, Paris)

Scientific classification
- Kingdom: Animalia
- Phylum: Mollusca
- Class: Gastropoda
- Subclass: Caenogastropoda
- Order: Neogastropoda
- Superfamily: Conoidea
- Family: Pseudomelatomidae
- Genus: Crassispira
- Species: C. soamanitraensis

Binomial name
- Crassispira soamanitraensis Bozzetti, 2008

= Crassispira soamanitraensis =

Species of gastropod

Crassispira soamanitraensis is a species of sea snail, a marine gastropod mollusc in the family Pseudomelatomidae.

== Description ==
The length of the shell attains 10 mm.

== Distribution ==
This marine species occurs off Madagascar.
