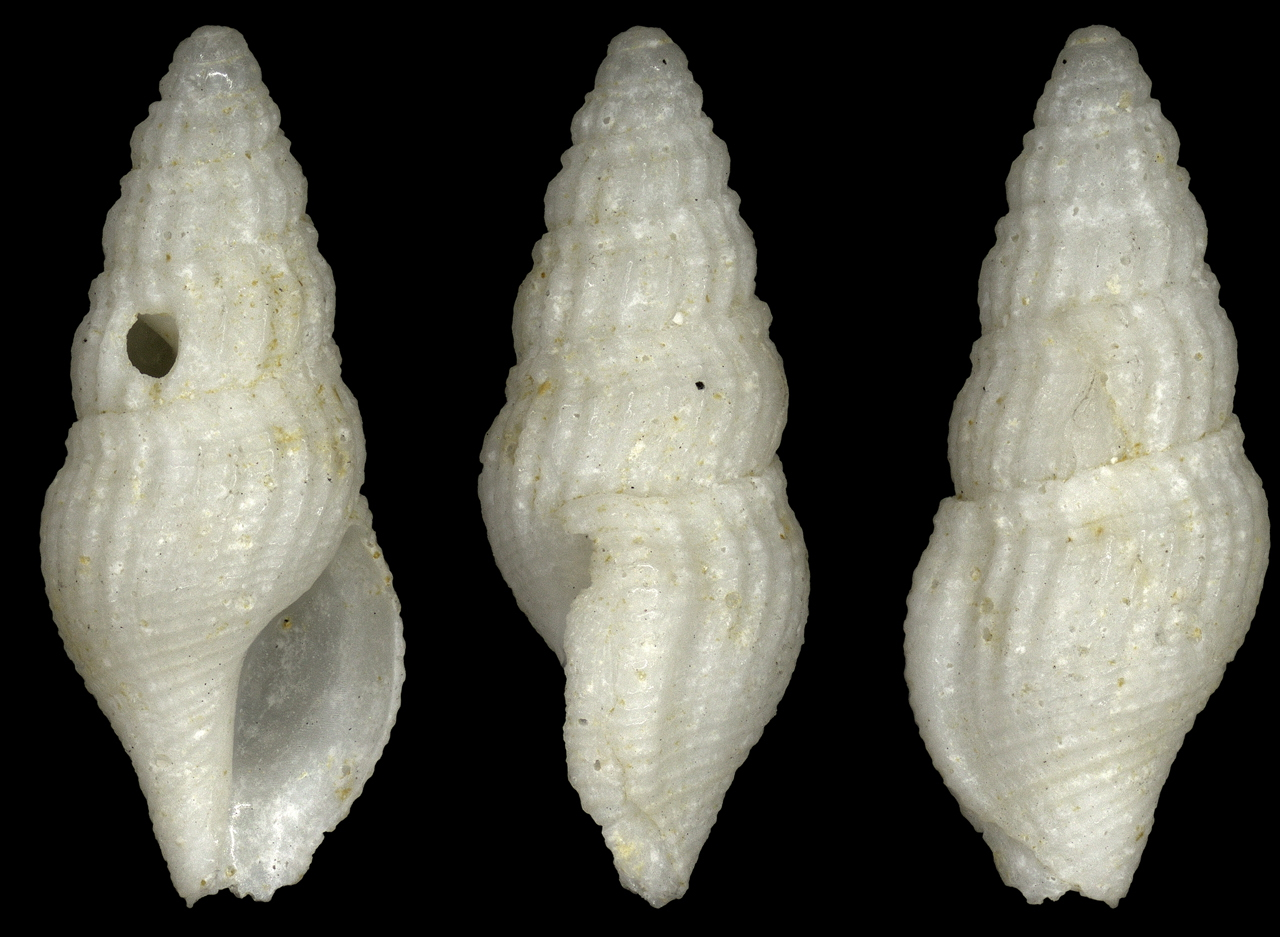
- Shell of † Crassispira pseudodanjouxi (syntype in MNHN, Paris)

Scientific classification
- Kingdom: Animalia
- Phylum: Mollusca
- Class: Gastropoda
- Subclass: Caenogastropoda
- Order: Neogastropoda
- Superfamily: Conoidea
- Family: Pseudomelatomidae
- Genus: Crassispira
- Species: C. pseudodanjouxi

Binomial name
- Crassispira pseudodanjouxi Brébion, 1992

Synonyms
- † Crassispira (Tripia) pseudodanjouxi Brébion, 1992

= Crassispira pseudodanjouxi =

Extinct species of gastropod

Crassispira pseudodanjouxi is an extinct species of sea snail, a marine gastropod mollusk in the family Pseudomelatomidae, the turrids and allies.

== Distribution ==
Fossils of this species have been found in Eocene strata in the Paris Basin in France.
