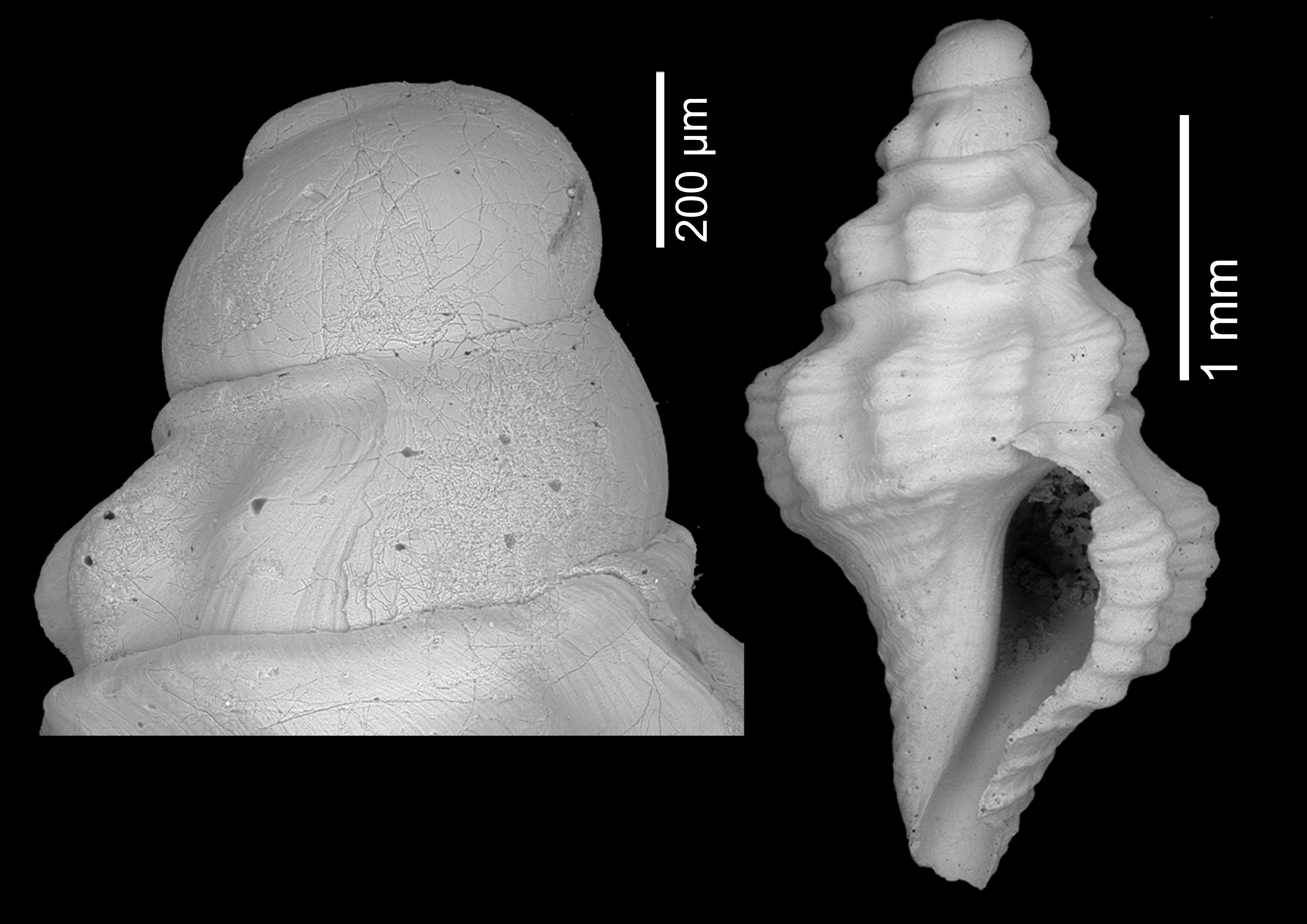
- Protoconch and shell of Crassispira lozoueti (specimen at MNHN, Paris)

Scientific classification
- Kingdom: Animalia
- Phylum: Mollusca
- Class: Gastropoda
- Subclass: Caenogastropoda
- Order: Neogastropoda
- Superfamily: Conoidea
- Family: Pseudomelatomidae
- Genus: Crassispira
- Species: C. lozoueti

Binomial name
- Crassispira lozoueti (Tucker & Le Renard, 1993)

= Crassispira lozoueti =

Extinct species of gastropod

Crassispira lozoueti is an extinct species of sea snail, a marine gastropod mollusk in the family Pseudomelatomidae, the turrids and allies.

== Distribution ==
Fossils have been found in Oligocene strata in Aquitaine, France.
