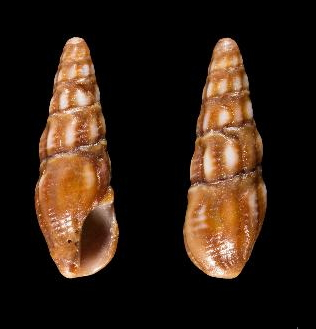
- Shell of Crassispira lavanonoensis (holotype in MNHN, Paris)

Scientific classification
- Kingdom: Animalia
- Phylum: Mollusca
- Class: Gastropoda
- Subclass: Caenogastropoda
- Order: Neogastropoda
- Superfamily: Conoidea
- Family: Pseudomelatomidae
- Genus: Crassispira
- Species: C. lavanonoensis

Binomial name
- Crassispira lavanonoensis Bozzetti, 2008

= Crassispira lavanonoensis =

Species of gastropod

Crassispira lavanonoensis is a species of sea snail, a marine gastropod mollusc in the family Pseudomelatomidae.

== Description ==
The length of the shell attains 13 mm. It has a golden brown, almost copper-like color. The whorls grow bigger, towards the base and there's a distinct pattern of threads.

== Distribution ==
This marine species occurs off Southern Madagascar
