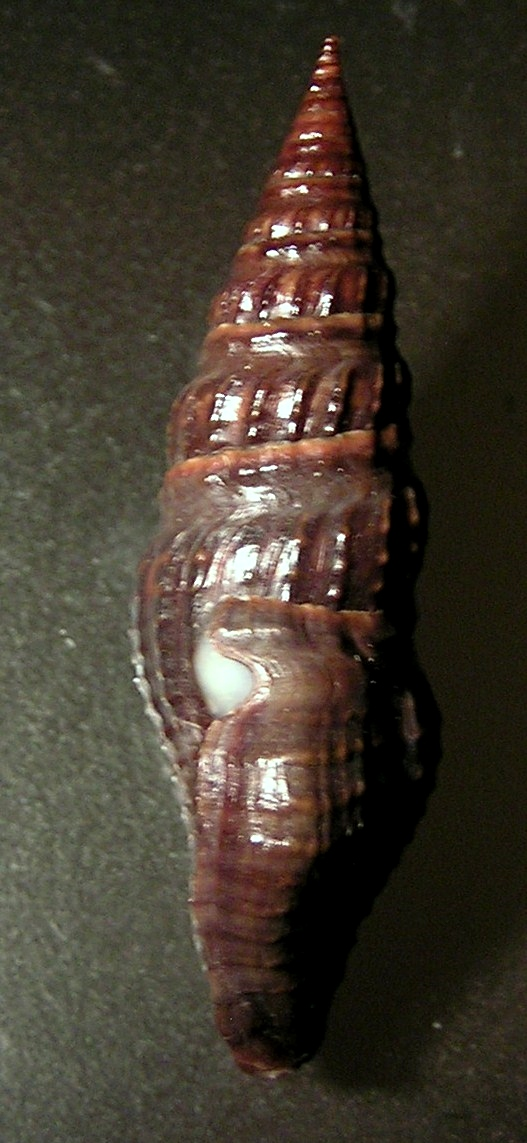
- A shell of Crassispira incrassata

Scientific classification
- Kingdom: Animalia
- Phylum: Mollusca
- Class: Gastropoda
- Subclass: Caenogastropoda
- Order: Neogastropoda
- Superfamily: Conoidea
- Family: Pseudomelatomidae
- Genus: Crassispira; Swainson, 1840

Type species
- Pleurotoma bottae Valenciennes in Kiener, 1839

Species
- See text

Synonyms
- Crassispira (Crassiclava) McLean, 1971· accepted, alternate representation; Crassispira (Crassispirella) Bartsch & Rehder, 1939· accepted, alternate representation; † Crassispira (Tripia) de Gregorio, 1890 · accepted, alternate representation; Drillia (Crassispira) Swainson, 1840; Pleurotoma (Crassispira) Swainson, 1840; Striospira Bartsch, 1950 (junior synonym)

= Crassispira =

Crassispira Temporal range: 48.6–0 Ma Eocene–Present

Genus of gastropods

Crassispira is a genus of small predatory sea snails with narrow, high-spired shells, marine gastropod mollusks in the family Pseudomelatomidae. They first appeared in the fossil record approximately 48.6 million years ago during the Eocene epoch, and still exist in the present day.

== Taxonomy ==
The small blackish "Drillias" so common in Panamic waters, of which Pleurotoma bottae Valenciennes is the type, were brought under the name of Crassispira Swainson, 1840 by W.H. Dall in 1918.

== Description ==
Most species in this genus have a tall spire and a truncated anterior canal. The ribs are overridden by spirals, forming beads or nodules. Under the subsutural keel is the sinus area which is rather smooth.

The small shell is subclavate and tuberculated. The spire is thick and lengthened. The outer lip shows a slight sinus above and is thickened internally at the top and the bottom. The top of the inner lip has a thick pad. The basal channel is slightly defined.

The shell is medium-sized. The aperture is moderately long and wide, scarcely contracted at the base, forming a suggestion of a siphonal canal, moderately emarginate at the base. The siphonal fasciole is slightly bulging. The body whorl is varicose near the outer lip. A distinctive feature is the deep anal sinus, which is usually located on a subsutural ramp and is often bordered by a raised rib or fasciole. The apex is semicircular and lies some distance from the suture below thread on the anal fasciole. The base of outer lip bears a very shallow, broad sinus, or stromboid notch. The inner lip is detached. The parietal callus is thickened adjoining the anal sinus. The sculpture consists of narrow axial ribs, between which the spiral threads or grooves. The anal fasciole bears a strong spiral cord. (Based on original figures, Kiener, Coquilles vivantes, Pleurotoma, pp. 33–34, pi. 15, fig. 2, 1839.)

The shell has a strong subsutural collar, a moderately narrow but strongly concave subsutural slope, strong axial ribs that do not cross the subsutural slope, and strong spiral threads between the axial ribs.

== Species ==
Species within the genus Crassispira are numerous. According to the World Register of Marine Species (WoRMS), they include:

- Crassispira abdera (Dall, 1919)
- † Crassispira abundans Conrad, 1840
- † Crassispira acuticosta (Nyst, 1845)
- Crassispira adana (Bartsch, 1950)
- † Crassispira aegis Woodring, 1928
- Crassispira aequatorialis Thiele, 1925
- Crassispira affinis (Reeve, 1846)
- Crassispira albobrunnea Horro, Gori, Rosado & Rolán, 2021
- Crassispira angelettii Bozzetti, 2008
- † Crassispira angulosa (Deshayes, 1834)
- † Crassispira annella Woodring, 1928
- Crassispira ansonae Wells, 1990
- Crassispira apicata (Reeve, 1845)
- Crassispira appressa (Carpenter, 1864)
- Crassispira apta Thiele, 1925
- † Crassispira armoricensis (Cossmann, 1896)
- † Crassispira aster Lozouet, 2015
- Crassispira asthenes Faber, 2007
- Crassispira aurea Kantor et al. 2017
- Crassispira ballenaensis Hertlein & Strong, 1951
- † Crassispira balnearum (Boussac, 1911)
- † Crassispira bataviana Martin, 1895
- Crassispira bernardi Fernandes et al., 1995
- † Crassispira berthelini (de Boury, 1899)
- Crassispira bifurca (Smith E. A., 1888)
- † Crassispira birmanica Vredenburg, 1921
- Crassispira blanquilla Fallon, 2011
- † Crassispira boadicea (Dall, 1900)
- † Crassispira borealis (Kautsky, 1925)
- Crassispira bottae (Valenciennes in Kiener, 1840)
- Crassispira bridgesi Dall, 1919
- † Crassispira brocchii (Bellardi & Michelotti, 1841)
- Crassispira bruehli Stahlschmidt & Fraussen, 2014
- Crassispira brujae Hertlein & Strong, 1951
- † Crassispira calligona (Maury, 1910)
- Crassispira callosa (Kiener, 1840)
- Crassispira cana Fallon, 2011
- Crassispira candelae Horro, Gori, Rosado & Rolán, 2021
- † Crassispira capella Olsson, 1930
- Crassispira carbonaria (Reeve, 1843)
- Crassispira cerithina (Anton, 1838)
- Crassispira cerithoidea (Carpenter, 1857)
- Crassispira chacei Hertlein & Strong, 1951
- Crassispira chazaliei (Dautzenberg, 1900)
- Crassispira coelata (Hinds, 1843)
- Crassispira comasi Fernández-Garcés & Rolán, 2010
- † Crassispira conica Jung, 1965
- Crassispira consociata (E.A. Smith, 1877)
- † Crassispira constricta Vredenburg, 1921
- † Crassispira contabulata Cossmann, 1889
- Crassispira coracina McLean & Poorman, 1971
- Crassispira cortezi Shasky & Campbell, 1964
- Crassispira cubana (Melvill, 1923)
- Crassispira currani McLean & Poorman, 1971
- † Crassispira cymation Woodring, 1970
- † Crassispira daguini (Peyrot, 1931)
- † Crassispira dalabeensis Vredenburg, 1921
- † Crassispira danjouxii (Baudon, 1853)
- † Crassispira degrangei (Peyrot, 1931)
- † Crassispira detrita (Peyrot, 1938)
- Crassispira dhofarensis Horro, Gori, Rosado & Rolán, 2021
- Crassispira discoloris Horro, Gori, Rosado & Rolán, 2021
- Crassispira discors (Sowerby I, 1834)
- Crassispira dysoni (Reeve, 1846)
- Crassispira elatior (C. B. Adams, 1845)
- Crassispira epicasta Dall, 1919
- Crassispira erigone Dall, 1919
- † Crassispira erronea Cossmann, 1902
- Crassispira eurynome Dall, 1919
- † Crassispira finitima (de Boury, 1899)
- Crassispira flavescens (Reeve, 1843)
- Crassispira flavocarinata (Smith E. A., 1882)
- Crassispira flavocincta (C. B. Adams, 1850)
- Crassispira flavonodulosa (Smith E. A., 1879)
- Crassispira funebralis Fernandes et al., 1995
- † Crassispira furcata (Lamarck, 1804)
- Crassispira fuscescens (Reeve, 1843)
- Crassispira fuscobrevis Rolán, Ryall & Horro, 2007
- Crassispira fuscocincta (C. B. Adams, 1850)
- † Crassispira girgillus Dolfus, 1899
- † Crassispira glaphyrella (Cossmann & Pissarro, 1900)
- † Crassispira granulata (Lamarck, 1804)
- Crassispira greeleyi (Dall, 1901)
- † Crassispira grignonensis (Cossmann, 1889)
- † Crassispira guayana Pilsbry & Olsson, 1941
- Crassispira guildingii (Reeve, 1845)
- Crassispira hanleyi (Carpenter, 1857)
- Crassispira harfordiana (Reeve, 1843)
- Crassispira harpularia (Desmoulins, 1842)
- † Crassispira hataii MacNeil, 1960
- † Crassispira hispaniolae (Maury, 1917)
- Crassispira hondurasensis (Reeve, 1846)
- Crassispira hosoi (Okutani, 1964)
- † Crassispira hypermeces (Cossmann, 1889)
- Crassispira incrassata (Sowerby I, 1834)
- † Crassispira inflexa (Lamarck, 1804)
- Crassispira integra Thiele, 1925
- † Crassispira iravadica Vredenburg, 1921
- † Crassispira ischnomorpha (Cossmann & Pissarro, 1900)
- † Crassispira jamaicense Guppy, 1866
- † Crassispira kachhensis Vredenburg, 1925
- † Crassispira kamaensis Vredenburg, 1921
- Crassispira kluthi Jordan, 1936
- † Crassispira labroplicata (Cossmann, 1896)
- Crassispira laevisulcata Von Maltzan, 1883
- † Crassispira lagouardensis Lozouet, 2015
- Crassispira latiriformis (Melvill, 1923)
- Crassispira latizonata (Smith E. A., 1882)
- Crassispira lavanonoensis Bozzetti, 2008
- † Crassispira lavillei (de Boury, 1899)
- † Crassispira lepta (Edwards, 1861)
- † Crassispira lesbarritzensis Lozouet, 2015
- Crassispira lirae Horro, Gori, Rosado & Rolán, 2021
- † Crassispira logani Dey, 1961
- † Crassispira lomata Woodring, 1928
- † Crassispira losquemadica (Maury, 1917)
- † Crassispira lozoueti (Tucker & Le Renard, 1993)
- † Crassispira lyopleura McNeil, 1984
- Crassispira mackintoshi Fallon, 2011
- † Crassispira maonisriparum (Maury, 1917)
- † Crassispira margaritula (Deshayes, 1834)
- Crassispira martiae McLean & Poorman, 1971
- Crassispira masinoi Fallon, 2011
- Crassispira maura (Sowerby I, 1834)
- † Crassispira mausseneti (Cossmann, 1889)
- Crassispira mayaguanaensis Fallon, 2011
- † Crassispira mekranica Vredenburg, 1925
- Crassispira melonesiana (Dall & Simpson, 1901)
- Crassispira mennoi Jong & Coomans, 1988
- † Crassispira meunieri (Maury, 1910)
- Crassispira microstoma Smith, 1882
- † Crassispira mindegyiensi Vredenburg, 1921
- Crassispira monilecosta Fernandes et al., 1995
- Crassispira monteiroi Horro, Gori, Rosado & Rolán, 2021
- Crassispira montereyensis (Stearns, 1871)
- Crassispira multicostata Fallon, 2011
- † Crassispira myaukmigonensis Vredenburg, 1921
- † Crassispira nana (Deshayes, 1834)
- Crassispira nigerrima (Sowerby I, 1834)
- Crassispira nigrescens (C. B. Adams, 1845)
- Crassispira nina Thiele, 1925
- † Crassispira nodulosa (Lamarck, 1804)
- † Crassispira obliquata (Cossmann, 1889)
- Crassispira ochrobrunnea Melvill, 1923
- † Crassispira octocrassicosta Lozouet, 2017
- Crassispira oliva Fernandes et al., 1995
- † Crassispira oxyacrum (Cossmann, 1889)
- † Crassispira passaloides (Cossmann, 1902)
- Crassispira pellisphocae (Reeve, 1845)
- † Crassispira perrugata Dall, 1890
- Crassispira pini Fernandes et al., 1995
- † Crassispira plateaui (Cossmann, 1889)
- † Crassispira plioibericostricta Brunetti & Forli, 2021
- † Crassispira plioparvula Vera-Peláez, 2002
- Crassispira pluto Pilsbry & Lowe, 1932
- † Crassispira ponida Woodring, 1928
- Crassispira premorra (Dall, 1889)
- Crassispira procera Kantor et al., 2017
- † Crassispira promensis Noetling, 1901
- † Crassispira propeangulosa (Cossmann, 1889)
- Crassispira pseudocarbonaria Nolf, 2009
- † Crassispira pseudoglabra Brunetti & Forli, 2021
- Crassispira pseudocarinata (Reeve, 1845)
- † Crassispira pseudodanjouxi Brébion, 1992
- † Crassispira pseudoprincipalis (Yokoyama, 1920)
- Crassispira pulchrepunctata Stahlschmidt & Bozzetti, 2007
- Crassispira quadrifasciata (Reeve, 1845)
- † Crassispira quoniamensis (Boussac in Périer, 1941)
- † Crassispira raricostulata (Deshayes, 1865)
- Crassispira recurvirostrata Kuroda, 1972
- Crassispira rhythmica Melvill, 1927
- † Crassispira ritanida Mansfield, 1925
- Crassispira rubidofusca (Schepman, 1913)
- Crassispira rudis (Sowerby I, 1834)
- Crassispira rugitecta (Dall, 1918)
- Crassispira rustica (Sowerby I, 1834)
- Crassispira sacerdotalis Rolan & Fernandes, 1992
- Crassispira safagaensis Kilburn & Dekker, 2008
- † Crassispira sanctistephani Lozouet, 2017
- Crassispira sandrogorii Ryall, Horro & Rolán, 2009
- Crassispira sanibelensis Bartsch & Rehder, 1939
- Crassispira scala Kantor et al., 2017
- Crassispira schillingi (Weinkauff & Kobelt, 1876)
- † Crassispira seiuncta (Bellardi, 1877)
- † Crassispira semicolon (Sowerby I, 1816)
- Crassispira semigranosa (Reeve, 1846)
- Crassispira sinensis (Hinds, 1843)
- Crassispira soamanitraensis Bozzetti, 2008
- Crassispira somalica Morassi & Bonfitto, 2013
- † Crassispira starri Hertlein, 1927
- † Crassispira strangulata Harzhauser, Raven & Landau, 2018
- † Crassispira streptophora Bayan, 1873
- † Crassispira subbataviana Vredenburg, 1921
- † Crassispira subgranulosa (d'Orbigny, 1850)
- † Crassispira subpromensis Vredenburg, 1921
- † Crassispira suffecta Pezant, 1909
- † Crassispira sulcata (Lamarck, 1804)
- Crassispira sundaica Thiele, 1925
- Crassispira takeokensis (Otuka, 1949)
- Crassispira tasconium (Melvill & Standen, 1901)
- † Crassispira tenuicrenata (Cossmann, 1902)
- Crassispira tepocana Dall, 1919
- † Crassispira terebra (Basterot, 1825)
- † Crassispira tittabweensis Vredenburg, 1921
- † Crassispira toulai (Cossmann, 1913)
- Crassispira trencarti Ryall, Horro & Rolán, 2009
- Crassispira trimariana Pilsbry & Lowe, 1932
- Crassispira tuckerana Bonfitto & Morassi, 2011
- Crassispira turricula (Sowerby I, 1834)
- † Crassispira tyloessa Woodring, 1970
- Crassispira unicolor (Sowerby I, 1834)
- † Crassispira vasseuri (Cossmann, 1896)
- Crassispira verbernei Jong & Coomans, 1988
- Crassispira vexillum (Reeve, 1845)
- Crassispira vezzaroi Cossignani, 2014
- † Crassispira virodunensis Lozouet, 2017
- † Crassispira woodringi Olsson, 1930
- Crassispira xanti Hertlein & Strong, 1951

Nomen nudum

- Crassispira eous Ekdale, 1974

Species brought into synonymy

- Crassispira adamsi De Jong & Coomans, 1988: synonym of Crassispira elatior (C. B. Adams, 1845) (Unnecessary replacement name for Pleurotoma elatior C.B. Adams, 1845, believed to be preoccupied by P. elatior d'Orbigny, "1842" [in fact 1847])
- Crassispira adamsiana Pilsbry & Lowe, 1932: synonym of Crassispira harfordiana (Reeve, 1843)
- Crassispira aesopus (Schepman, 1913): synonym of Inquisitor aesopus (Schepman, 1913)
- Crassispira affinis Reeve, 1846 junior homonym of Crassispira flavescens (Reeve, 1845)
- Crassispira albomaculata (d'Orbigny, 1847): synonym of Pilsbryspira nodata (C. B. Adams, 1850)
- Crassispira albonodulosa (E. A. Smith, 1904): synonym of Psittacodrillia albonodulosa (E. A. Smith, 1904)
- Crassispira albovallosa Carpenter, 1856: synonym of Crassispira rudis (Sowerby I, 1834)
- Crassispira amathea Dall, 1919: synonym of Pilsbryspira amathea (Dall, 1919)
- Crassispira anthamilla Melvill, 1923: synonym of Crassispira chazaliei (Dautzenberg, 1900)
- Crassispira arsinoe Dall, 1919: synonym of Pilsbryspira arsinoe (Dall, 1919)
- Crassispira aureonodosa Pilsbry & Lowe, 1932: synonym of Pilsbryspira aureonodosa (Pilsbry & Lowe, 1932)
- Crassispira bacchia Dall, 1919: synonym of Pilsbryspira bacchia (Dall, 1919)
- Crassispira bairstowi (Sowerby III, 1886): synonym of Psittacodrillia bairstowi (Sowerby III, 1886)
- Crassispira bandata (Nowell-Usticke, 1971): synonym of Crassispira latizonata (E. A. Smith, 1882)
- Crassispira bandata (Nowell-Usticke, 1969) : synonym of Monilispira bandata (Nowell-Usticke, 1969)
- Crassispira barkliensis Adams, 1869: synonym of Drillia barkliensis (Adams, 1869)
- Crassispira bittium Dall, 1924: synonym of Ceritoturris bittium (Dall, 1924) (original combination)
- † Crassispira calligonoides Gardner, 1938: synonym of † Hindsiclava calligonoides Gardner, 1938
- Crassispira cancellata Carpenter, 1864: synonym of Crassispira pellisphocae (Reeve, 1845)
- Crassispira candace Dall, 1919: synonym of Pyrgospira candace (Dall, 1919)
- Crassispira caribbaea (E.A. Smith, 1882): synonym of Buchema interstrigata (Smith E.A., 1882)
- Crassispira cornuta Sowerby I, 1834: synonym of Crassispira nigerrima (Sowerby I, 1834)
- Crassispira cubensis Smith, 1882: synonym of Crassispira kluthi Jordan, 1936
- Crassispira cuprea Reeve, 1843: synonym of Crassispira fuscescens (Reeve, 1843)
- Crassispira diversa (E. A. Smith, 1882): synonym of Psittacodrillia diversa (E. A. Smith, 1882)
- Crassispira drangai Schwengel, 1951: synonym of Strictispira drangai (Schwengel, 1951)
- Crassispira ebenina Dall, 1883: synonym of Strictispira solida C.B. Adams, 1850
- Crassispira ericana Hertlein & Strong, 1951: synonym of Strictispira ericana (Hertlein & Strong, 1951)
- Crassispira flavescens Reeve, 1846: synonym of Crassispira affinis (Reeve, 1846)
- Crassispira flavonodosa Pilsbry & H. N. Lowe, 1932: synonym of Crassispira eurynome Dall, 1919
- Crassispira flucki (Brown & Pilsbry, 1913): synonym of Pilsbryspira flucki (Brown & Pilsbry, 1913)
- Crassispira fonseca Pilsbry and Lowe, 1932: synonym of Pilsbryspira atramentosa
- Crassispira granulosa Sowerby I, 1834: synonym of Buchema granulosa (Sowerby I, 1834)
- Crassispira hermanita Pilsbry & Lowe, 1932: synonym of Maesiella hermanita (Pilsbry & Lowe, 1932)
- Crassispira hottenta (E. A. Smith, 1882): synonym of Clavus hottentotus (E. A. Smith, 1882)
- Crassispira hottentota (E. A. Smith, 1882): synonym of Clavus hottentotus (E. A. Smith, 1882)
- Crassispira inaequistriata Li, 1930: synonym of Crassispira maura (Sowerby I, 1834)
- Crassispira jungi Macsotay & Campos Villarroel, 2001: synonym of Hindsiclava jungi (Macsotay & Campos Villarroel, 2001)
- Crassispira kandai Kuroda, 1950: synonym of Pilsbryspira kandai (Kuroda, 1950)
- Crassispira layardi (Sowerby III, 1897): synonym of Crassiclava layardi (Sowerby III, 1897)
- Crassispira leucocyma (Dall, 1884): synonym of Pilsbryspira leucocyma (Dall, 1884)
- Crassispira loxospira Pilsbry & Lowe, 1932: synonym of Pilsbryspira loxospira (Pilsbry & Lowe, 1932)
- Crassispira luctuosa d'Orbigny, 1847: synonym of Crassispira cubensis (E. A. Smith, 1882)
- Crassispira lysidia (Duclos, 1850): synonym of Monilispira lysidia (Duclos, 1850)
- Crassispira mesoleuca Rehder, 1943: synonym of Crassispira cubana (Melvill, 1923)
- Crassispira monilifera (Carpenter, 1857): synonym of Monilispira monilifera (Carpenter, 1857)
- Crassispira monilis (Bartsch & Rehder, 1939): synonym of Pilsbryspira monilis (Bartsch & Rehder, 1939)
- Crassispira nigricans Dall, 1919: synonym of Crassispira maura (Sowerby I, 1834)
- Crassispira nymphia Pilsbry & Lowe, 1932: synonym of Pilsbryspira nymphia (Pilsbry & Lowe, 1932)
- Crassispira ochsneri (Hertlein & Strong, 1949: synonym of Cleospira ochsneri (Hertlein & Strong, 1949)
- Crassispira ostrearum (Stearns, 1872): synonym of Pyrgospira ostrearum (Stearns, 1872)
- Crassispira palliata (Reeve, 1845): synonym of Crassispira kluthi Jordan, 1936
- Crassispira pardalis Hinds, 1844: synonym of Anachis pardalis (Hinds, 1843)
- Crassispira paxillus (Reeve, 1845): synonym of Strictispira paxillus (Reeve, 1845)
- Crassispira perla Smith, 1947: synonym of Crassispira maura (Sowerby I, 1834)
- Crassispira phasma Schwengel, 1940: synonym of Fenimorea phasma (Schwengel, 1940) (original combination)
- † Crassispira pseudospirata (d'Orbigny, 1850): synonym of † Drilliola pseudospirata (d'Orbigny, 1850)
- Crassispira quadrilirata (E. A. Smith, 1882): synonym of Carinodrillia quadrilirata (E. A. Smith, 1882)
- Crassispira reigeni Bartsch, 1950: synonym of Zonulispira grandimaculata (C.B. Adams, 1852)
- Crassispira rufovaricosa Kuroda, Habe & Oyama, 1971: synonym of Inquisitor rufovaricosa (Kuroda, Habe & Oyama, 1971)
- Crassispira saulcydiana (Récluz, 1851): synonym of Drillia umbilicata Gray, 1838
- Crassispira solida (C. B. Adams, 1850): synonym of Clathrodrillia solida (C. B. Adams, 1850)
- Crassispira sowerbyi Reeve, 1843: synonym of Crassispira turricula (Sowerby I, 1834)
- Crassispira stilmani Shasky, 1971: synonym of Strictispira stillmani Shasky, 1971
- Crassispira strigata Sowerby II, 1874: synonym of Drillia barkliensis (H. Adams, 1869)
- Crassispira sultana Thiele, 1925: synonym of Paradrillia sultana (Thiele, 1925) (original combination)
- Crassispira tabogaensis Bartsch, 1931: synonym of Crassispira kluthi Jordan, 1936
- Crassispira tampaensis Bartsch & Rehder, 1939: synonym of Pyrgospira tampaensis (Bartsch & Rehder, 1939)
- Crassispira tangolaensis Hertlein, L.G. & A.M. Strong, 1951: synonym of Crassispira unicolor (Sowerby I, 1834)
- † Crassispira terebra Basterot, 1825: synonym of † Drillia terebra (Basterot, 1825)
- Crassispira thiarella Kiener, 1840: synonym of Crassispira nigerrima (Sowerby I, 1834)
- Crassispira tripter Maltzan, 1883: synonym of Drillia tripter Von Maltzan, 1883
- Crassispira tuckeri Bonfitto & Morassi, 2004: synonym of Crassispira tuckerana Bonfitto & Morassi, 2011
- Crassispira walteri Smith M., 1946: synonym of Clathrodrillia walteri (Smith M., 1946)
