= Crassispira aequatorialis =

Scientific classification
- Kingdom: Animalia
- Phylum: Mollusca
- Class: Gastropoda
- Subclass: Caenogastropoda
- Order: Neogastropoda
- Superfamily: Conoidea
- Family: Pseudomelatomidae
- Genus: Crassispira
- Species: C. aequatorialis

Binomial name
- Crassispira aequatorialis Thiele, 1925

Species of gastropod

Crassispira aequatorialis is a species of sea snail, a marine gastropod mollusk in the family Pseudomelatomidae.

== Distribution ==
This marine species occurs off Northeast Sumatra and was found at a depth of 750 m.
