= Crassispira asthenes =

Scientific classification
- Kingdom: Animalia
- Phylum: Mollusca
- Class: Gastropoda
- Subclass: Caenogastropoda
- Order: Neogastropoda
- Superfamily: Conoidea
- Family: Pseudomelatomidae
- Genus: Crassispira
- Species: C. asthenes

Binomial name
- Crassispira asthenes Faber, 2007

Synonyms
- Crassispira (Crassiclava) asthenes Faber, 2007· accepted, alternate representation

Species of gastropod

Crassispira asthenes is a species of sea snail, a marine gastropod mollusk in the family Pseudomelatomidae.

== Distribution ==
This marine species occurs off the Lesser Antilles.
