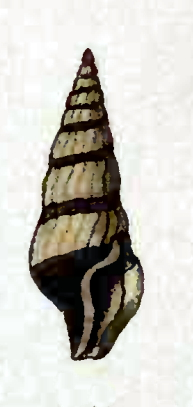
- Apertural view of a shell of Crassispira vexillum

Scientific classification
- Kingdom: Animalia
- Phylum: Mollusca
- Class: Gastropoda
- Subclass: Caenogastropoda
- Order: Neogastropoda
- Superfamily: Conoidea
- Family: Pseudomelatomidae
- Genus: Crassispira
- Species: C. vexillum

Binomial name
- Crassispira vexillum (Reeve, 1845)

Synonyms
- Crassispira (Crassiclava) vexillum (Reeve, 1845)· accepted, alternate representation; Pleurotoma vexillum Reeve, 1845 (original combination)

= Crassispira vexillum =

Species of gastropod

Crassispira vexillum is a species of sea snail, a marine gastropod mollusk in the family Pseudomelatomidae.

== Description ==
The length of the shell attains 11 mm.

The shell is closely ribbed, and with revolving ridges at the base. The color of the shell is yellowish, the lower half of the body-whorl, and a narrow lower portion of those of the spire chocolate-brown.

== Distribution ==
This marine species occurs off Barbuda and St. Vincent
