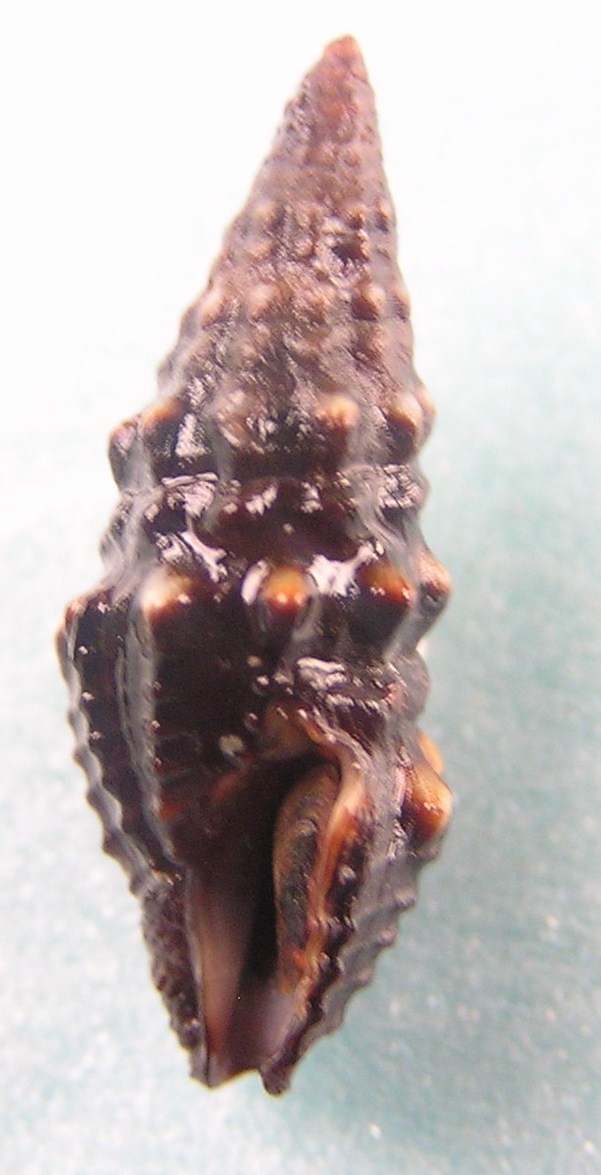
- Apertural view of a shell of Crassispira pluto

Scientific classification
- Kingdom: Animalia
- Phylum: Mollusca
- Class: Gastropoda
- Subclass: Caenogastropoda
- Order: Neogastropoda
- Superfamily: Conoidea
- Family: Pseudomelatomidae
- Genus: Crassispira
- Species: C. pluto

Binomial name
- Crassispira pluto Pilsbry and Lowe, 1932

Synonyms
- Crassispira (Monilispira) pluto Pilsbry and Lowe, 1932

= Crassispira pluto =

Species of gastropod

Crassispira pluto is a species of sea snail, a marine gastropod mollusk in the family Pseudomelatomidae.

== Description ==
The length of the shell varies between 14 mm and 20 mm.

== Distribution ==
This marine species occurs in the Sea of Cortez, Western Mexico down to Panama.
