= Crassispira constricta =

Scientific classification
- Kingdom: Animalia
- Phylum: Mollusca
- Class: Gastropoda
- Subclass: Caenogastropoda
- Order: Neogastropoda
- Superfamily: Conoidea
- Family: Pseudomelatomidae
- Genus: Crassispira
- Species: C. constricta

Binomial name
- Crassispira constricta (Vredenburg 1921)

Synonyms
- † Drillia (Crassispira) constricta Vredenburg 1921

Extinct species of gastropod

Crassispira constricta is an extinct species of sea snail, a marine gastropod mollusk in the family Pseudomelatomidae, the turrids and allies.

Drillia (Crassispira) constricta (Edwards, 1861) is a homonym.

== Distribution ==
Fossils have been found in Miocene strata of Myanmar; age range: 37.2 to 20.43 Ma
