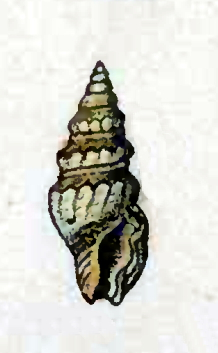
- Apertural view of a shell of Crassispira pseudocarinata

Scientific classification
- Kingdom: Animalia
- Phylum: Mollusca
- Class: Gastropoda
- Subclass: Caenogastropoda
- Order: Neogastropoda
- Superfamily: Conoidea
- Family: Pseudomelatomidae
- Genus: Crassispira
- Species: C. pseudocarinata

Binomial name
- Crassispira pseudocarinata (Reeve, 1845)

Synonyms
- Daphnella (Mangilia) pseudocarinata (Reeve, 1845); Mangilia pseudocarinata Reeve, 1845; Turris pseudocarinata (Reeve, 1845)

= Crassispira pseudocarinata =

Species of gastropod

Crassispira pseudocarinata is a species of sea snail, a marine gastropod mollusk in the family Pseudomelatomidae.

== Description ==
The length of the shell attains 9 mm.

The whorls are concavely shouldered, somewhat indistinctly keeled. The keel is rendered nodulous by the ends of close obliquely longitudinal ribs, which are short, becoming evanescent about the middle of the body whorl, everywhere with close revolving grooves, which are somewhat nodulous. The color of the shell is yellowish brown.

== Distribution ==
This marine species occurs off Tasmania
