= Crassispira logani =

Scientific classification
- Kingdom: Animalia
- Phylum: Mollusca
- Class: Gastropoda
- Subclass: Caenogastropoda
- Order: Neogastropoda
- Superfamily: Conoidea
- Family: Pseudomelatomidae
- Genus: Crassispira
- Species: C. logani

Binomial name
- Crassispira logani (A. Dey, 1961)

Synonyms
- † Drillia (Crassispira) logani A. Dey, 1961

Extinct species of gastropod

Crassispira logani is an extinct species of sea snail, a marine gastropod mollusk in the family Pseudomelatomidae, the turrids and allies. Fossils have been found in Miocene strata in Kerala, India, age range: 23.03 to 15.97 Ma.
