= Crassispira mennoi =

Scientific classification
- Kingdom: Animalia
- Phylum: Mollusca
- Class: Gastropoda
- Subclass: Caenogastropoda
- Order: Neogastropoda
- Superfamily: Conoidea
- Family: Pseudomelatomidae
- Genus: Crassispira
- Species: C. mennoi

Binomial name
- Crassispira mennoi De Jong & Coomans, 1988

Species of gastropod

Crassispira mennoi is a species of sea snail, a marine gastropod mollusk in the family Pseudomelatomidae.

== Description ==
The length of the shell attains 4.4 mm.

== Distribution ==
This species occurs in the Caribbean Sea off Curaçao as well as Aruba, Bonaire and Saba.
