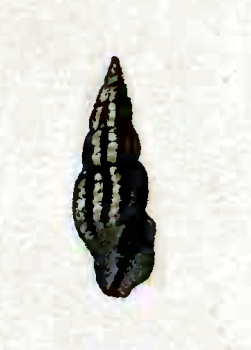
- Apertural view of a shell of Crassispira guildingii

Scientific classification
- Kingdom: Animalia
- Phylum: Mollusca
- Class: Gastropoda
- Subclass: Caenogastropoda
- Order: Neogastropoda
- Superfamily: Conoidea
- Family: Pseudomelatomidae
- Genus: Crassispira
- Species: C. guildingii

Binomial name
- Crassispira guildingii (Reeve, 1845)

Synonyms
- Clathurella guildingii (Reeve, 1845); Pleurotoma guildingii Reeve, 1845

= Crassispira guildingii =

Species of gastropod

Crassispira guildingii is a species of sea snail, a marine gastropod mollusk in the family Pseudomelatomidae.

== Description ==
The length of the shell varies attains 8 mm.

The whorls are slightly concavely shouldered above, nodosely plicated beneath, transversely very closely striated. The color of the shell is very dark chocolate or blackish, interior same color.

== Distribution ==
This marine species occurs off St. Vincent (Antilles) and the West Indies.
