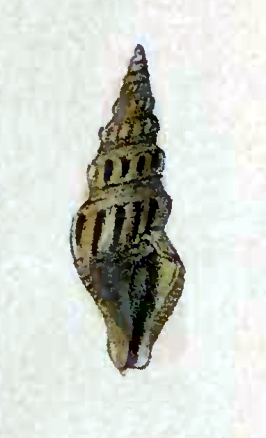
- Apertural view of a shell of Crassispira flavescens

Scientific classification
- Kingdom: Animalia
- Phylum: Mollusca
- Class: Gastropoda
- Subclass: Caenogastropoda
- Order: Neogastropoda
- Superfamily: Conoidea
- Family: Pseudomelatomidae
- Genus: Crassispira
- Species: C. flavescens

Binomial name
- Crassispira flavescens (Reeve, 1845)

Synonyms
- Crassispira affinis Reeve, 1846 (junior homonym); Crassispira (Crassiclava) affinis (Reeve, 1846)·; Drillia flavescens (Reeve, 1845); Pleurotoma affinis Reeve, 1846

= Crassispira flavescens =

Species of gastropod

Crassispira flavescens is a species of sea snail, a marine gastropod mollusk in the family Pseudomelatomidae.

== Description ==
The length of the shell attains 18 mm.

== Distribution ==
This marine species occurs off Saint Vincent (Antilles).
