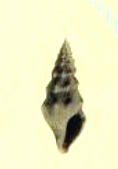
- Original image of a shell of Crassispira berthelini

Scientific classification
- Kingdom: Animalia
- Phylum: Mollusca
- Class: Gastropoda
- Subclass: Caenogastropoda
- Order: Neogastropoda
- Superfamily: Conoidea
- Family: Pseudomelatomidae
- Genus: Crassispira
- Species: C. berthelini

Binomial name
- Crassispira berthelini (de Boury, 1899)

Synonyms
- Drillia nodulosa Cossmann, 1899 (non Lamarck, 1804); Pleurotoma bertholini de Boury, 1899; Pleurotoma obliqua de Boury, 1899

= Crassispira berthelini =

Extinct species of gastropod

Crassispira berthelini is an extinct species of sea snail, a marine gastropod mollusk in the family Pseudomelatomidae, the turrids and allies.

== Distribution ==
Fossils have been found in Eocene strata in Ile-de-France, France.
