= Crassispira recurvirostrata =

Scientific classification
- Kingdom: Animalia
- Phylum: Mollusca
- Class: Gastropoda
- Subclass: Caenogastropoda
- Order: Neogastropoda
- Superfamily: Conoidea
- Family: Pseudomelatomidae
- Genus: Crassispira
- Species: C. recurvirostrata

Binomial name
- Crassispira recurvirostrata Kuroda, J.T., 1972

Species of gastropod

Crassispira recurvirostrata is a species of sea snail, a marine gastropod mollusc in the family Pseudomelatomidae. The length of the shell attains 50 mm. This marine species occurs off Japan and the Philippines.
