= Crassispira promensis =

Scientific classification
- Kingdom: Animalia
- Phylum: Mollusca
- Class: Gastropoda
- Subclass: Caenogastropoda
- Order: Neogastropoda
- Superfamily: Conoidea
- Family: Pseudomelatomidae
- Genus: Crassispira
- Species: C. promensis

Binomial name
- Crassispira promensis (Noetling, 1901)

Synonyms
- † Drillia (Crassispira) promensis Noetling 1901

Extinct species of gastropod

Crassispira promensis is an extinct species of sea snail, a marine gastropod mollusk in the family Pseudomelatomidae, the turrids and allies.

== Description ==
The length of the shell attains 29.5 mm, its diameter 9.5 mm.

== Distribution ==
Fossils have been found in Miocene strata in Myanmar, age range: 23.03 to 20.43 Ma
