= Crassispira fuscobrevis =

Scientific classification
- Kingdom: Animalia
- Phylum: Mollusca
- Class: Gastropoda
- Subclass: Caenogastropoda
- Order: Neogastropoda
- Superfamily: Conoidea
- Family: Pseudomelatomidae
- Genus: Crassispira
- Species: C. fuscobrevis

Binomial name
- Crassispira fuscobrevis Rolán et al., 2007

Species of gastropod

Crassispira fuscobrevis is a species of sea snail, a marine gastropod mollusk in the family Pseudomelatomidae.

== Distribution ==
This marine species occurs off Angola.
