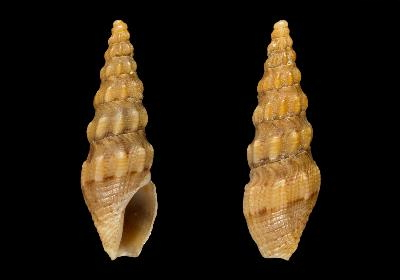
- Original image of a shell of Crassispira trencarti

Scientific classification
- Kingdom: Animalia
- Phylum: Mollusca
- Class: Gastropoda
- Subclass: Caenogastropoda
- Order: Neogastropoda
- Superfamily: Conoidea
- Family: Pseudomelatomidae
- Genus: Crassispira
- Species: C. trencarti

Binomial name
- Crassispira trencarti Ryall, Horro & Rolan, 2009

= Crassispira trencarti =

Species of gastropod

Crassispira trencarti is a species of sea snail, a marine gastropod mollusc in the family Pseudomelatomidae.

== Description ==
The length of the shell attains 12 mm.

== Distribution ==
This marine species occurs off Senegal.
