= Crassispira tittabweensis =

Scientific classification
- Kingdom: Animalia
- Phylum: Mollusca
- Class: Gastropoda
- Subclass: Caenogastropoda
- Order: Neogastropoda
- Superfamily: Conoidea
- Family: Pseudomelatomidae
- Genus: Crassispira
- Species: C. tittabweensis

Binomial name
- Crassispira tittabweensis (Vredenburg 1921): † Drillia (Crassispira) tittabweensis Vredenburg 1921

Extinct species of gastropod

Crassispira tittabweensis is an extinct species of sea snail, a marine gastropod mollusk in the family Pseudomelatomidae. Several 20.43 to 23.03 million-year-old fossils have been found in Miocene strata (Kama Stage) of Myanmar.
