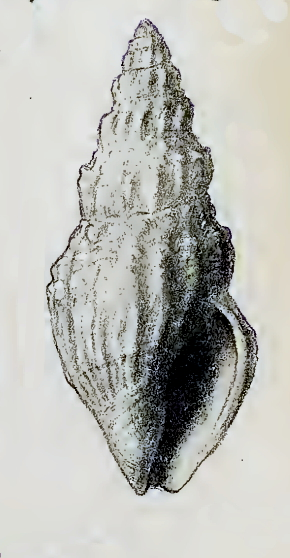
- Original image of a shell of Crassispira ochrobrunnea

Scientific classification
- Kingdom: Animalia
- Phylum: Mollusca
- Class: Gastropoda
- Subclass: Caenogastropoda
- Order: Neogastropoda
- Superfamily: Conoidea
- Family: Pseudomelatomidae
- Genus: Crassispira
- Species: C. ochrobrunnea

Binomial name
- Crassispira ochrobrunnea (Melvill, 1923)

Synonyms
- Drillia (Crassispira) ochrobrunnea Melvill, 1923

= Crassispira ochrobrunnea =

Species of gastropod

Crassispira ochrobrunnea is a species of sea snail, a marine gastropod mollusk in the family Pseudomelatomidae.

== Description ==
The length of the shell attains 21 mm, its diameter 8 mm.

(Original description) The solid, oblong-fusiform shell is yellow or ochreous-brown. It contains 8-9 whorls, of which the two whorls in the protoconch are smooth, globose and blunt at the actual apex. The remainder is suturally impressed, angled, longitudinally multicostate. The ribs are smooth, crossed by obscure spiral lines on the body whorl, more particularly towards the base. The whorls are ornamented with spiral rows of white beaded gemmae just below the sutures, and again in several regularly arranged rows on the ribs, and towards the base of the body whorl. There is, in the examples seen by the author, some extent of variation in the disposition of these gemmae, and likewise in the number of ribs. The aperture is ovate. The outer lip is slightly rounded in the largest specimen, straighter in the smaller, and with the sinus shallow but well expressed. The columellar margin is straight, . The siphonal canal is very short, slightly recurved basally.

== Distribution ==
This marine species occurs in the Indian Ocean off Mauritius
