= Crassispira capella =

Scientific classification
- Kingdom: Animalia
- Phylum: Mollusca
- Class: Gastropoda
- Subclass: Caenogastropoda
- Order: Neogastropoda
- Superfamily: Conoidea
- Family: Pseudomelatomidae
- Genus: Crassispira
- Species: C. capella

Binomial name
- Crassispira capella A.A. Olsson, 1930

Extinct species of gastropod

Crassispira capella is an extinct species of sea snail, a marine gastropod mollusk in the family Pseudomelatomidae, the turrids and allies. Fossils have been found in Eocene strata in Northern Peru; age range: 40.4 to 37.2 Ma.
