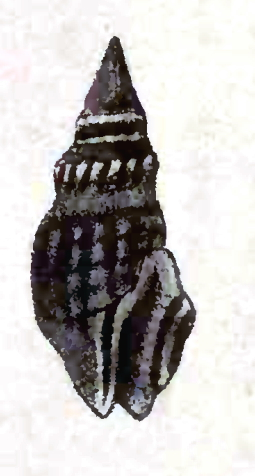
- Apertural view of a shell of Crassispira nigerrima

Scientific classification
- Kingdom: Animalia
- Phylum: Mollusca
- Class: Gastropoda
- Subclass: Caenogastropoda
- Order: Neogastropoda
- Superfamily: Conoidea
- Family: Pseudomelatomidae
- Genus: Crassispira
- Species: C. nigerrima

Binomial name
- Crassispira nigerrima (Sowerby I, 1834)

Synonyms
- Crassispira cornuta (Sowerby I, 1834); Crassispira thiarella Kiener, 1840; Crassispira (Striospira) nigerrima (Sowerby I, 1834); Drillia nigerrima (G.B. Sowerby I, 1834); Pleurotoma nigerrima Sowerby I, 1834 (original combination)

= Crassispira nigerrima =

Species of gastropod

Crassispira nigerrima, common name the jet-black pleurotoma, is a species of sea snail, a marine gastropod mollusk in the family Pseudomelatomidae.

== Description ==
The length of the shell varies between 13 mm and 20 mm.

(Original description) The jet-black shell is acuminately pyramidal. The upper part of the whorls is flat and slightly knobbed near the suture. The lower portion is finely striated transversely, ribbed longitudinally, the ribs curved and rather wide apart. The aperture is oblong. The siphonal canal is rather long and a little reflected.

== Distribution ==
This marine species occurs from the Gulf of California to Ecuador.
