= Crassispira funebralis =

Scientific classification
- Kingdom: Animalia
- Phylum: Mollusca
- Class: Gastropoda
- Subclass: Caenogastropoda
- Order: Neogastropoda
- Superfamily: Conoidea
- Family: Pseudomelatomidae
- Genus: Crassispira
- Species: C. funebralis

Binomial name
- Crassispira funebralis Fernandes et al, 1995

Species of gastropod

Crassispira funebralis is a species of sea snail. It is a marine gastropod mollusk in the family Pseudomelatomidae.

== Distribution ==
This marine species occurs off Angola
