= Crassispira masinoi =

Scientific classification
- Kingdom: Animalia
- Phylum: Mollusca
- Class: Gastropoda
- Subclass: Caenogastropoda
- Order: Neogastropoda
- Superfamily: Conoidea
- Family: Pseudomelatomidae
- Genus: Crassispira
- Species: C. masinoi

Binomial name
- Crassispira masinoi Fallon, 2011

Synonyms
- Crassispira (Crassiclava) masinoi Fallon, 2011· accepted, alternate representation

Species of gastropod

Crassispira masinoi is a species of sea snail, a marine gastropod mollusk in the family Pseudomelatomidae.
