= Crassispira iravadica =

Scientific classification
- Kingdom: Animalia
- Phylum: Mollusca
- Class: Gastropoda
- Subclass: Caenogastropoda
- Order: Neogastropoda
- Superfamily: Conoidea
- Family: Pseudomelatomidae
- Genus: Crassispira
- Species: C. iravadica

Binomial name
- Crassispira iravadica (Vredenburg 1921)

Synonyms
- † Drillia (Crassispira) iravadica Vredenburg 1921

Extinct species of gastropod

Crassispira iravadica is an extinct species of sea snail, a marine gastropod mollusk in the family Pseudomelatomidae, the turrids and allies.

== Distribution ==
Fossils have been found in Miocene strata (Kama Stage) of Myanmar; age range: 23.03 to 20.43 Ma
