= Crassispira bifurca =

Scientific classification
- Kingdom: Animalia
- Phylum: Mollusca
- Class: Gastropoda
- Subclass: Caenogastropoda
- Order: Neogastropoda
- Superfamily: Conoidea
- Family: Pseudomelatomidae
- Genus: Crassispira
- Species: C. bifurca

Binomial name
- Crassispira bifurca (E.A. Smith, 1888)

Synonyms
- Crassispira (Dallspira) bifurca (E.A. Smith, 1888); Pleurotoma (Crassispira) bifurca E.A. Smith, 1888

Species of gastropod

Crassispira bifurca is a species of sea snail, a marine gastropod mollusk in the family Pseudomelatomidae.

== Description ==
The length of the shell attains 21 mm, its diameter 7 mm.

The elongate shell has a pyramidal shape. It contains 12 whorls. The upper part of the whorls is carinate close to the suture and below concave and faintly striate. Below they show a series of 10 large tubercles The aperture is small, measuring 3/8 of the total length. The outer lip is slightly sinuate above the nodules. The siphonal canal is very short. The general colour of this shell is dirty yellowish,.The lower half of the upper whorls between the nodules are black, as is also the middle portion of the body whorl. The four spiral series of little tubercles on the fine ribs of the body whorl are bright yellow. That two riblets bifurcate from each of the large tubercles is very remarkable.

== Distribution ==
This marine species occurs in the Pacific Ocean off Panama.
