= Crassispira borealis =

Scientific classification
- Kingdom: Animalia
- Phylum: Mollusca
- Class: Gastropoda
- Subclass: Caenogastropoda
- Order: Neogastropoda
- Superfamily: Conoidea
- Family: Pseudomelatomidae
- Genus: Crassispira
- Species: C. borealis

Binomial name
- Crassispira borealis (F. Kautsky, 1925)

Synonyms
- † Pleurotomoides borealis F. Kautsky, 1925

Extinct species of gastropod

Crassispira borealis is an extinct species of sea snail, a marine gastropod mollusk in the family Pseudomelatomidae, the turrids and allies.

== Description ==
The length of the shell attains 7 mm.

== Distribution ==
Fossils have been found in Pliocene and Miocene strata of Belgium, the Netherlands, Germany, Italy, Denmark, and Romania.
