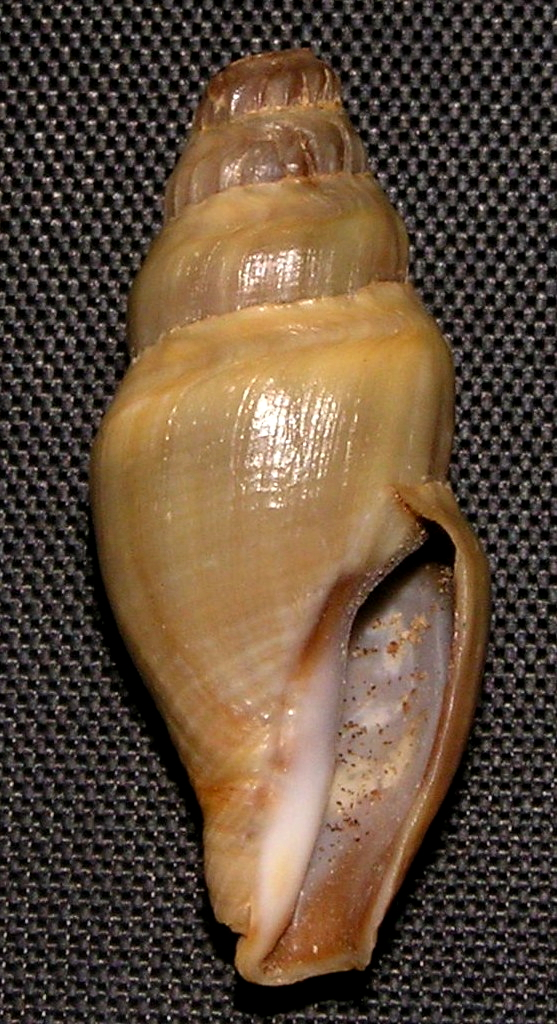
- Apertural view of a shell of Crassispira oliva

Scientific classification
- Kingdom: Animalia
- Phylum: Mollusca
- Class: Gastropoda
- Subclass: Caenogastropoda
- Order: Neogastropoda
- Superfamily: Conoidea
- Family: Pseudomelatomidae
- Genus: Crassispira
- Species: C. oliva

Binomial name
- Crassispira oliva Fernandes et al, 1995

= Crassispira oliva =

Species of gastropod

Crassispira oliva is a species of sea snail, a marine gastropod mollusk in the family Pseudomelatomidae.

== Description ==
The length of the shell attains 32 mm.

== Distribution ==
This marine species occurs off the Democratic Republic of the Congo and Angola.
