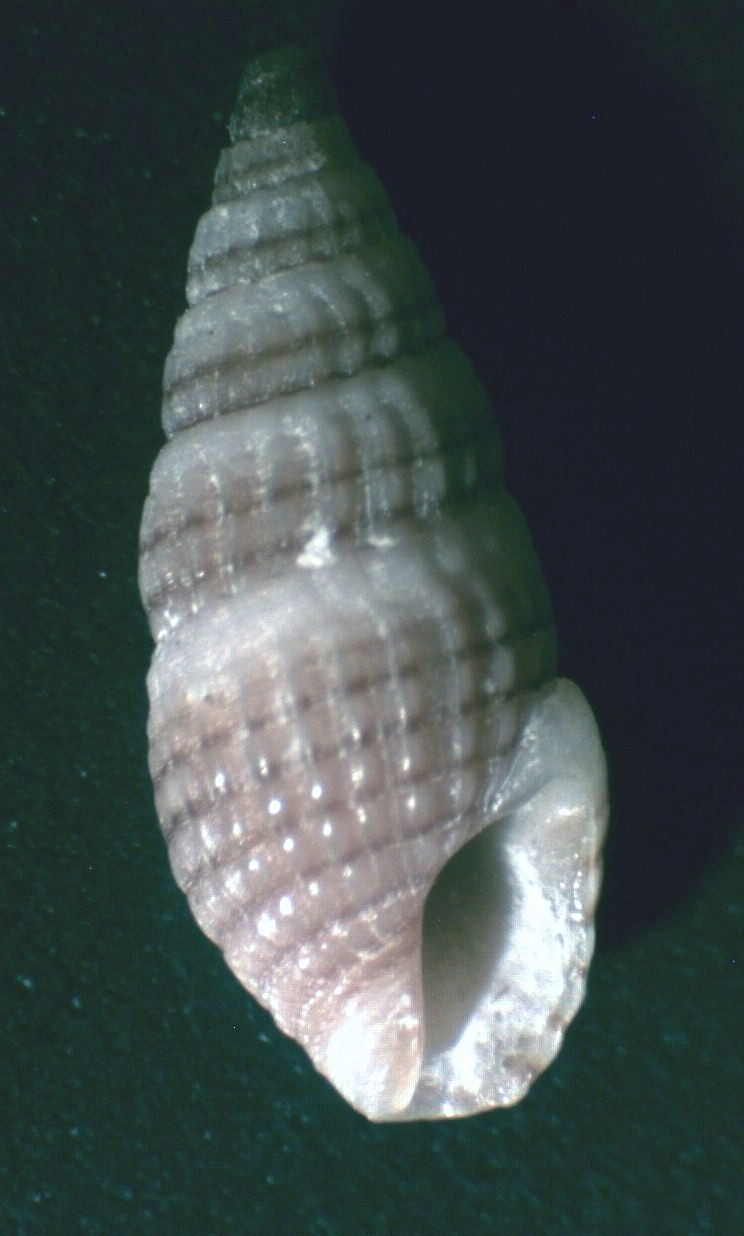
- Apertural view of a shell of Crassispira verbernei

Scientific classification
- Kingdom: Animalia
- Phylum: Mollusca
- Class: Gastropoda
- Subclass: Caenogastropoda
- Order: Neogastropoda
- Superfamily: Conoidea
- Family: Pseudomelatomidae
- Genus: Crassispira
- Species: C. verbernei

Binomial name
- Crassispira verbernei De Jong & Coomans, 1988

= Crassispira verbernei =

Species of gastropod

Crassispira verbernei is a species of sea snail, a marine gastropod mollusk in the family Pseudomelatomidae.

== Description ==
The shell of Crassispira verbernei is typically elongated and conical, exhibiting prominent axial ribs and a moderately high spire. The aperture is narrow. The shell surface is marked by fine, spiral grooves that run along the whorls. The color of the shells can vary, but they often show a whitish to yellowish hue, with darker lines forming around the spiral grooves. The length of the shell attains 4.8 mm.

== Distribution ==
This marine species occurs in the Caribbean Sea off Colombia and the Netherlands Antilles.
