= Crassispira microstoma =

Scientific classification
- Kingdom: Animalia
- Phylum: Mollusca
- Class: Gastropoda
- Subclass: Caenogastropoda
- Order: Neogastropoda
- Superfamily: Conoidea
- Family: Pseudomelatomidae
- Genus: Crassispira
- Species: C. microstoma

Binomial name
- Crassispira microstoma (E.A. Smith, 1882)

Synonyms
- Pleurotoma (Crassispira) microstoma E.A. Smith, 1882

Species of gastropod

Crassispira microstoma is a species of sea snail, a marine gastropod mollusk in the family Pseudomelatomidae.

== Description ==
The length of the shell attains 16 mm, its diameter 5 mm.

The solid, elongate, subturreted shell contains 9-10 whorls. This species is remarkable for having the first two whorls large, and not smooth and glassy as in most other species in this genus, but finely ribbed and lirated. The shell has a golden color. The aperture is very small, measuring about 1/3 of the total length. The siphonal canal is very short and recurved. The columella is callous and shows tubercles at the suture. The sinus is small.

== Distribution ==
This marine species occurs off Sri Lanka
