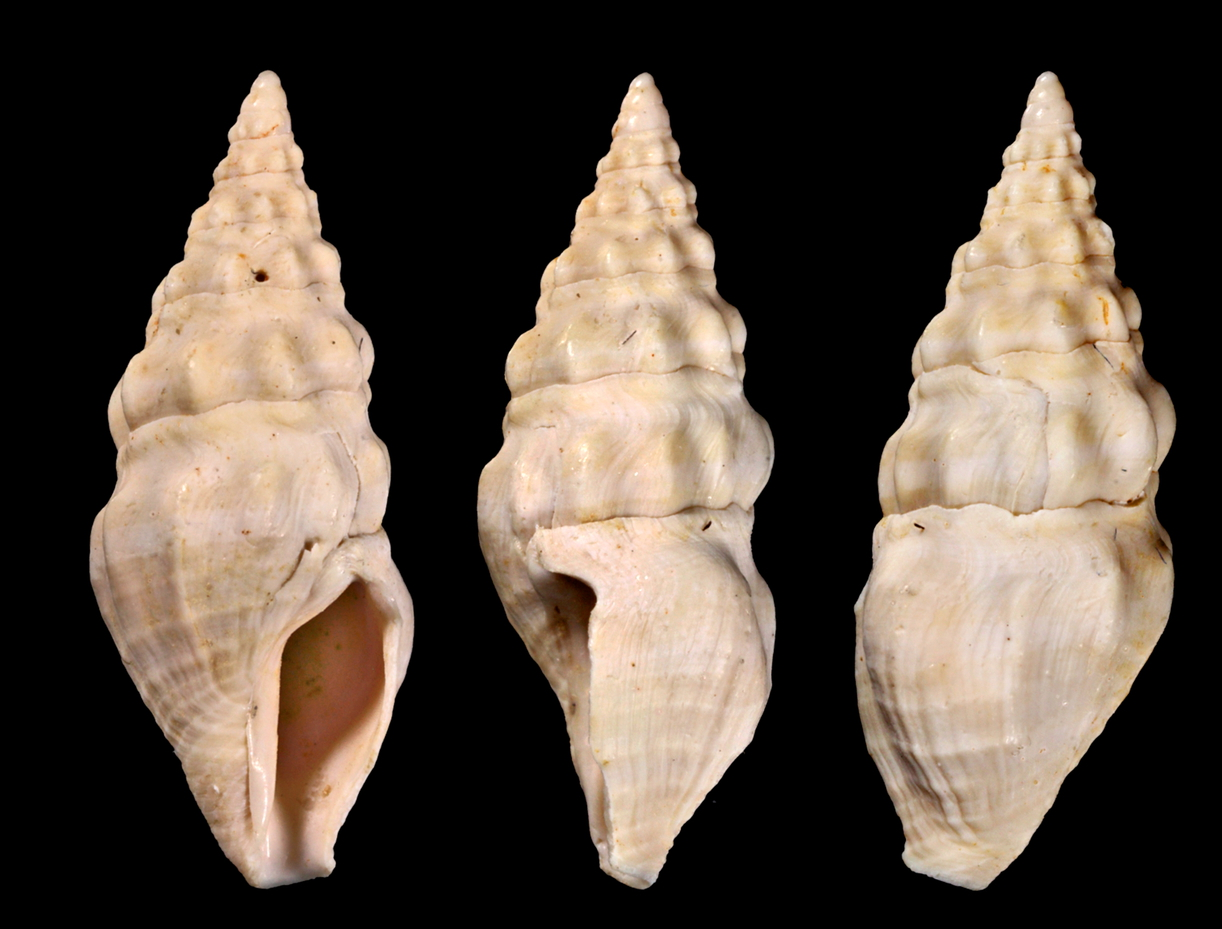
- Shells of Crassispira lagouardensis (holotype in MNHN, Paris)

Scientific classification
- Kingdom: Animalia
- Phylum: Mollusca
- Class: Gastropoda
- Subclass: Caenogastropoda
- Order: Neogastropoda
- Superfamily: Conoidea
- Family: Pseudomelatomidae
- Genus: Crassispira
- Species: †C. lagouardensis

Binomial name
- †Crassispira lagouardensis Lozouet, 2015

= Crassispira lagouardensis =

Extinct species of gastropod

Crassispira lagouardensis is an extinct species of sea snail, a marine gastropod mollusk in the family Pseudomelatomidae, the turrids and allies.

== Description ==
This marine gastropod forms part of a genus of small predatory sea snails with narrow and high-spired shells. The length of the shell attains 11 mm.

== Distribution ==
Fossils have been found in Oligocene and lower Miocene strata in Aquitaine, France
