= Crassispira comasi =

Scientific classification
- Kingdom: Animalia
- Phylum: Mollusca
- Class: Gastropoda
- Subclass: Caenogastropoda
- Order: Neogastropoda
- Superfamily: Conoidea
- Family: Pseudomelatomidae
- Genus: Crassispira
- Species: C. comasi

Binomial name
- Crassispira comasi Fernández-Garcés & Rolán, 2010

Species of gastropod

Crassispira comasi is a species of sea snail, a marine gastropod mollusk in the family Pseudomelatomidae.

== Distribution ==
This marine species occurs off Cuba at depths between 30 m and 54 m.
