= Crassispira guayana =

Scientific classification
- Kingdom: Animalia
- Phylum: Mollusca
- Class: Gastropoda
- Subclass: Caenogastropoda
- Order: Neogastropoda
- Superfamily: Conoidea
- Family: Pseudomelatomidae
- Genus: Crassispira
- Species: C. guayana

Binomial name
- Crassispira guayana Pilsbry and Olsson 1941

Extinct species of gastropod

Crassispira guayana is an extinct species of sea snail, a marine gastropod mollusk in the family Pseudomelatomidae, the turrids and allies. Fossils have been found in Pliocene and Pleistocene strata in Ecuador; age range: 5.332 to 2.588 Ma.
