= Crassispira ritanida =

Scientific classification
- Kingdom: Animalia
- Phylum: Mollusca
- Class: Gastropoda
- Subclass: Caenogastropoda
- Order: Neogastropoda
- Superfamily: Conoidea
- Family: Pseudomelatomidae
- Genus: Crassispira
- Species: C. ritanida

Binomial name
- Crassispira ritanida (W.C. Mansfield, 1925)

Synonyms
- † Drillia (Crassispirella) ritanida W.C. Mansfield, 1925

Extinct species of gastropod

Crassispira ritanida is an extinct species of sea snail, a marine gastropod mollusk in the family Pseudomelatomidae, the turrids and allies.

== Description ==
The length of the shell attains 8.5 mm, its diameter is 4 mm.

== Distribution ==
Fossils have been found in Pliocene strata in Trinidad and Tobago; age range: 5.332 to 3.6 Ma.
