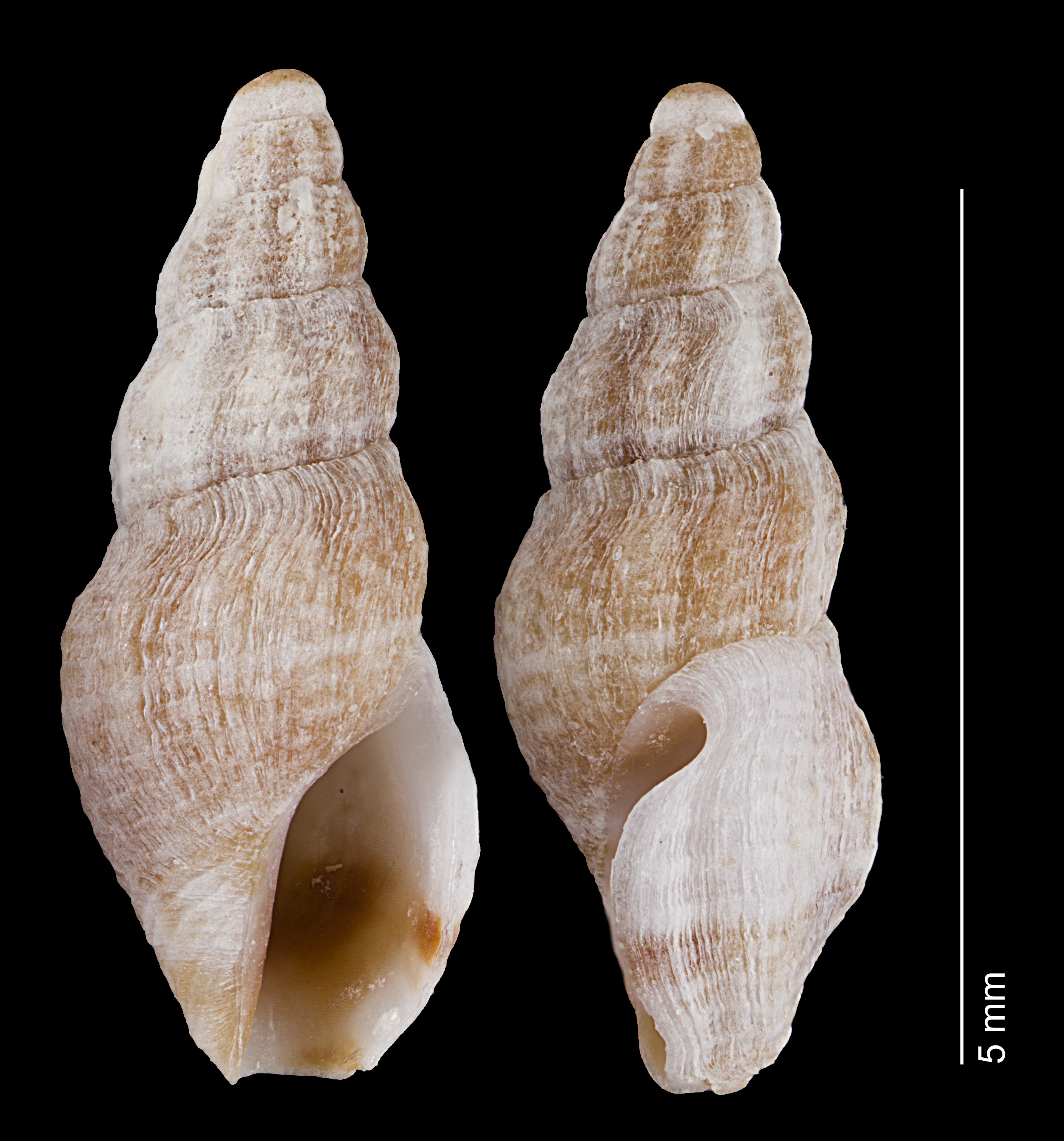
- Shell of Crassispira monteiroi (holotype at MNHN, Paris)

Scientific classification
- Kingdom: Animalia
- Phylum: Mollusca
- Class: Gastropoda
- Subclass: Caenogastropoda
- Order: Neogastropoda
- Superfamily: Conoidea
- Family: Pseudomelatomidae
- Genus: Crassispira
- Species: C. monteiroi

Binomial name
- Crassispira monteiroi Horro, Gori, Rosado & Rolán, 2021

= Crassispira monteiroi =

Species of gastropod

Crassispira monteiroi is a species of sea snail, a marine gastropod mollusc in the family Pseudomelatomidae.

== Distribution ==
This marine species occurs off Oman.
