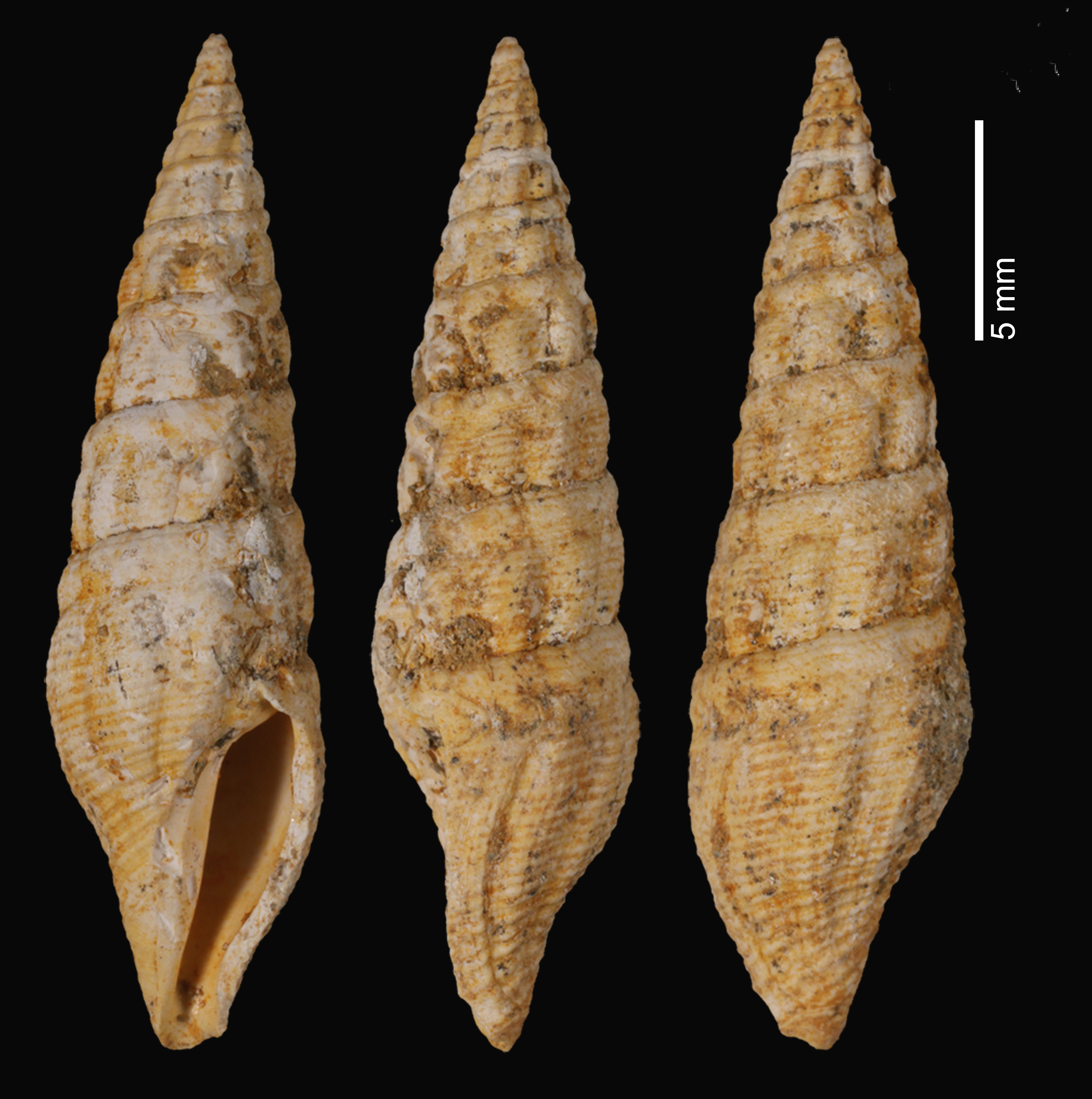
- Shells of Crassispira terebra (specimens at MNHN, Paris)

Scientific classification
- Kingdom: Animalia
- Phylum: Mollusca
- Class: Gastropoda
- Subclass: Caenogastropoda
- Order: Neogastropoda
- Superfamily: Conoidea
- Family: Pseudomelatomidae
- Genus: Crassispira
- Species: C. terebra

Binomial name
- Crassispira terebra (de Basterot, 1825)

Synonyms
- † Drillia losquemadica (B. de Basterot, 1825); † Pleurotoma terebra B. de Basterot, 1825

= Crassispira terebra =

Extinct species of gastropod

Crassispira terebra is an extinct species of sea snail, a marine gastropod mollusk in the family Pseudomelatomidae, the turrids and allies.

== Description ==
The length of the shell attains 28 mm. William Swainson, an English malacologist, published a book in 1840 in which he describes this genus of molluscs as having a "shell tuberculated", being "club-shaped" and its "aperture widest in the middle."

== Distribution ==
Fossils have been found in Oligocene strata in Aquitaine, France.
