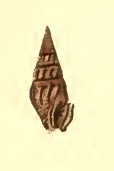
- Original image of a shell of Crassispira rustica

Scientific classification
- Kingdom: Animalia
- Phylum: Mollusca
- Class: Gastropoda
- Subclass: Caenogastropoda
- Order: Neogastropoda
- Superfamily: Conoidea
- Family: Pseudomelatomidae
- Genus: Crassispira
- Species: C. rustica

Binomial name
- Crassispira rustica (Sowerby I, 1834)

Synonyms
- Pleurotoma rustica Sowerby I, 1834

= Crassispira rustica =

Species of gastropod

Crassispira rustica, common name the rustic pleurotoma, is a species of sea snail, a marine gastropod mollusk in the family Pseudomelatomidae.

== Description ==
The length of the shell attains 22 mm.

(Original description) The rude, rather thick shell is oblong, pyramidal and brownish black. The whorls are keeled near the suture, longitudinally ribbed below. The ribs are numerous and sharp; the ribs of the body whorl flowing down, crossed with lines. The aperture is short. The siphonal canal is very short. The sinus is rounded.

== Distribution ==
This species occurs in the Pacific Ocean from Colombia to Panama.
