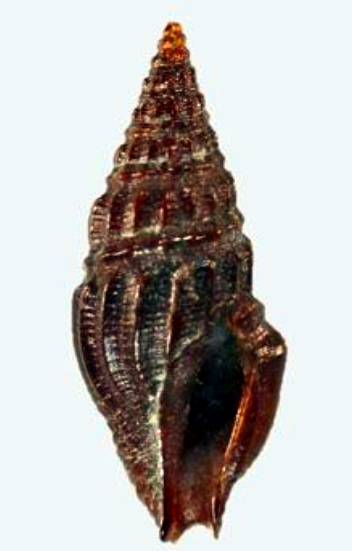
- Shell of Crassispira cubensis (specimen in the Natural History Museum Rotterdam)

Scientific classification
- Kingdom: Animalia
- Phylum: Mollusca
- Class: Gastropoda
- Subclass: Caenogastropoda
- Order: Neogastropoda
- Superfamily: Conoidea
- Family: Pseudomelatomidae
- Genus: Crassispira
- Species: C. cubensis

Binomial name
- Crassispira cubensis (E. A. Smith, 1882)

Synonyms
- Crassispira luctuosa (A. d'Orbigny, 1847); Pleurotoma (Crassispira) cubensis E. A. Smith, 1882 (basionym); Pleurotoma luctuosa Orbigny, A.V.M.D. d', 1847

= Crassispira cubensis =

Species of gastropod

Crassispira cubensis is a species of sea snail, a marine gastropod mollusc in the family Pseudomelatomidae.

== Description ==
Although the maximum recorded shell length is 11 mm, it is hypothesised to range from 10mm to 20mm in length.

Original description

"Given that the specific name luctuosa had already been assigned by Hinds to a Californian species within the Pleurotomidae, I (i.e. E. A. Smith) found it necessary to introduce cubensis as the new trivial name for this West-Indian shell."

== Distribution ==
This marine species lives in a benthic habitat off the tropical, West Atlantic coast of Cuba and the Virgin Islands.
