= Crassispira acuticosta =

Scientific classification
- Kingdom: Animalia
- Phylum: Mollusca
- Class: Gastropoda
- Subclass: Caenogastropoda
- Order: Neogastropoda
- Superfamily: Conoidea
- Family: Pseudomelatomidae
- Genus: Crassispira
- Species: C. acuticosta

Binomial name
- Crassispira acuticosta (Nyst, 1845)

Synonyms
- † Pleurotoma acuticosta Nyst, 1845

Extinct species of gastropod

Crassispira acuticosta is an extinct species of sea snail, a marine gastropod mollusk in the family Pseudomelatomidae, the turrids and allies.

== Distribution ==
Fossils have been found in Oligocene strata in Limburg, Belgium.
