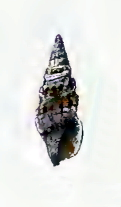
- Original image of a shell of Crassispira flavonodulosa

Scientific classification
- Kingdom: Animalia
- Phylum: Mollusca
- Class: Gastropoda
- Subclass: Caenogastropoda
- Order: Neogastropoda
- Superfamily: Conoidea
- Family: Pseudomelatomidae
- Genus: Crassispira
- Species: C. flavonodulosa

Binomial name
- Crassispira flavonodulosa (E.A. Smith, 1879)

Synonyms
- Drillia flavonodulosa E.A. Smith, 1879 (original combination); Pilsbryspira flavonodulosa (E.A. Smith, 1879)

= Crassispira flavonodulosa =

Species of gastropod

Crassispira flavonodulosa is a species of sea snail, a marine gastropod mollusk in the family Pseudomelatomidae.

== Description ==
The length of the shell attains 9.5 mm, its diameter 3 mm.

(Original description) The solid shell is ovately fusiform. It is pale fleshy white, banded with yellow on a series of nodules around the lower half of the whorls, stained with reddish brown between the nodules, with a second series of yellow gemmules, with a reddish-brown lira beneath it, situated a little below the middle of the body whorl. The shell contains 7½ whorls, the apical ones large, the rest undulately carinated above at the suture, then concave, coarsely ribbed and spirally lirate. Two of the lirae (in all six in number) are vastly stouter than the rest, and on crossing the ribs form two distinct series of nodules around the lower part of the whorls. The other lirae above and below these are fine and threadlike. Beneath the sutural wavy keel on the last whorl are three fine lirae. Then follow nine of the coarse nodulous ones; and around the basal extremity or cauda, which is brownish, are about six finer ones. The aperture is small, a little more than one third the entire length of the specimen. The outer lip is not thickened, rather deeply sinuated in the concavity at the upper part of the whorl. The columella is smooth, a trifle oblique, very slightly tortuous, covered with a moderately thick livid enamel. The siphonal canal is very short.

== Distribution ==
This marine species occurs off Japan.
