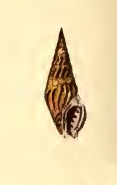
- Original image of a shell of Crassispira unicolor

Scientific classification
- Kingdom: Animalia
- Phylum: Mollusca
- Class: Gastropoda
- Subclass: Caenogastropoda
- Order: Neogastropoda
- Superfamily: Conoidea
- Family: Pseudomelatomidae
- Genus: Crassispira
- Species: C. unicolor

Binomial name
- Crassispira unicolor (Sowerby I, 1834)

Synonyms
- Crassispira (Burchia) unicolor (G. B. Sowerby I, 1834); Crassispira erebus Pilsbry & H. N. Lowe, 1932 junior subjective synonym; Crassispira tangolaensis Hertlein, L.G. & A.M. Strong, 1951; Pleurotoma unicolor Sowerby I, 1834

= Crassispira unicolor =

Species of gastropod

Crassispira unicolor, common name the uniformly coloured pleurotoma, is a species of sea snail, a marine gastropod mollusk in the family Pseudomelatomidae.

== Description ==
The length of the shell varies between 14 mm and 22 mm.

(Original description) The rather thick shell is oblong, pyramidal and pale brownish black. The whorls are smooth, encircled with a single row of granules near the suture, longitudinally ribbed below. The aperture is short. The siphonal canal is very short. The sinus is rounded.

== Distribution ==
This species occurs in the Pacific Ocean off Panama.
