= Crassispira currani =

Scientific classification
- Kingdom: Animalia
- Phylum: Mollusca
- Class: Gastropoda
- Subclass: Caenogastropoda
- Order: Neogastropoda
- Superfamily: Conoidea
- Family: Pseudomelatomidae
- Genus: Crassispira
- Species: C. currani

Binomial name
- Crassispira currani McLean & Poorman, 1971

Synonyms
- Crassispira (Striospira) currani McLean & Poorman, 1971

Species of gastropod

Crassispira currani is a species of sea snail, a marine gastropod mollusk in the family Pseudomelatomidae.

== Description ==
The length of the shell attains 11.1 mm; its diameter 4.3 mm.

== Distribution ==
This species occurs in the Pacific Ocean from Mexico to Panama.
