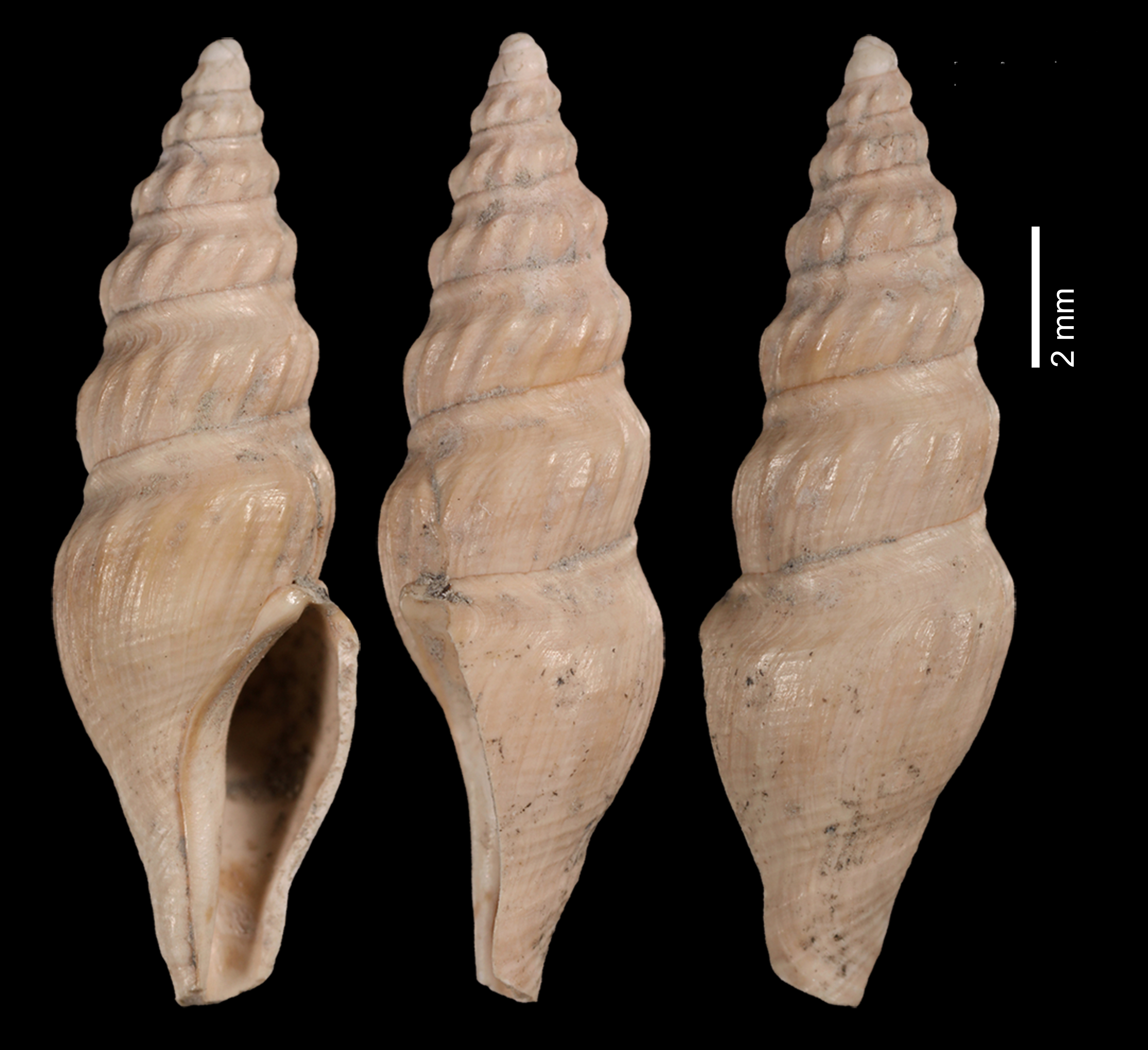
- Shells of Crassispira degrangei (specimens at MNHN, Paris)

Scientific classification
- Kingdom: Animalia
- Phylum: Mollusca
- Class: Gastropoda
- Subclass: Caenogastropoda
- Order: Neogastropoda
- Superfamily: Conoidea
- Family: Pseudomelatomidae
- Genus: Crassispira
- Species: C. degrangei

Binomial name
- Crassispira degrangei (Peyrot, 1931)

Synonyms
- † Drillia degrangei Peyrot, 1931

= Crassispira degrangei =

Extinct species of gastropod

Crassispira degrangei is an extinct species of sea snail, a marine gastropod mollusk in the family Pseudomelatomidae, the turrids and allies. Fossils have been found in Oligocene strata of Aquitaine, France.
