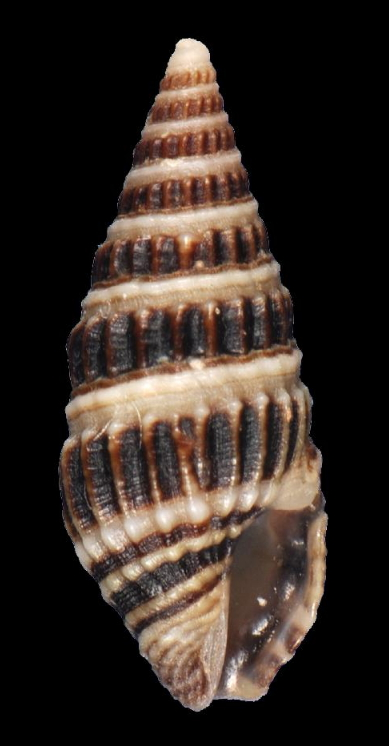
- Shell of Crassispira quadrifasciata (specimen in MNHN, Paris)

Scientific classification
- Kingdom: Animalia
- Phylum: Mollusca
- Class: Gastropoda
- Subclass: Caenogastropoda
- Order: Neogastropoda
- Superfamily: Conoidea
- Family: Pseudomelatomidae
- Genus: Crassispira
- Species: C. quadrifasciata

Binomial name
- Crassispira quadrifasciata (Reeve, 1845)

Synonyms
- Drillia quadrifasciata (Reeve, 1845); Pleurotoma quadrifasciata Reeve, 1845; Pleurotoma (Crassispira) quadrifasciata Reeve, 1845

= Crassispira quadrifasciata =

Species of gastropod

Crassispira quadrifasciata is a species of sea snail, a marine gastropod mollusk in the family Pseudomelatomidae.

== Description ==
The length of the shell attains 13 mm.

The shape of the shell is pyramidal. The whorls are encircled with a single keel above and below, longitudinally closely ridged in the middle. The keels are whitish, the middle of the whorls bluish brown, ridges whitish. The aperture is small. The siphonal canal is very short.

== Distribution ==
This marine species occurs off Southeastern United States; Honduras; Cuba, Jamaica, and Northern Brazil
