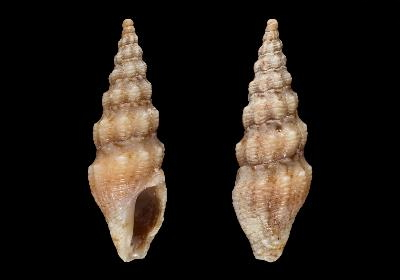
- Shells of Crassispira sandrogorii (holotype in MNHN, Paris)

Scientific classification
- Kingdom: Animalia
- Phylum: Mollusca
- Class: Gastropoda
- Subclass: Caenogastropoda
- Order: Neogastropoda
- Superfamily: Conoidea
- Family: Pseudomelatomidae
- Genus: Crassispira
- Species: C. sandrogorii

Binomial name
- Crassispira sandrogorii Ryall, Horro & Rolan, 2009

= Crassispira sandrogorii =

Species of gastropod

Crassispira sandrogorii is a species of sea snail, a marine gastropod mollusc in the family Pseudomelatomidae.

== Description ==
The length of the shell attains 13 mm. Most species in this genus have a tall spire and a truncated anterior canal. The ribs are overridden by spirals, forming beads or nodules. Under the subsutural keel is the sinus area rather smooth.

The small shell is subclavate and tuberculated. The spire is thick and, lengthened. The outer lip shows a slight sinus above and is thickened internally at the top and the bottom. The top of the inner lip has a thick pad. The basal channel is slightly defined.

== Distribution ==
This species occurs in the Atlantic Ocean off São Tomé y Principe.
