= Crassispira blanquilla =

Scientific classification
- Kingdom: Animalia
- Phylum: Mollusca
- Class: Gastropoda
- Subclass: Caenogastropoda
- Order: Neogastropoda
- Superfamily: Conoidea
- Family: Pseudomelatomidae
- Genus: Crassispira
- Species: C. blanquilla

Binomial name
- Crassispira blanquilla Fallon, 2011

Synonyms
- Crassispira (Crassiclava) blanquilla Fallon, 2011· accepted, alternate representation

Species of gastropod

Crassispira blanquilla is a species of sea snail, a marine gastropod mollusk in the family Pseudomelatomidae.
