= Crassispira suffecta =

Scientific classification
- Kingdom: Animalia
- Phylum: Mollusca
- Class: Gastropoda
- Subclass: Caenogastropoda
- Order: Neogastropoda
- Superfamily: Conoidea
- Family: Pseudomelatomidae
- Genus: Crassispira
- Species: C. suffecta

Binomial name
- Crassispira suffecta (Pezant, 1909)

Extinct species of gastropod

Crassispira suffecta is an extinct species of sea snail, a marine gastropod mollusk in the family Pseudomelatomidae, the turrids and allies.

== Description ==
The length of the shell attains 28 mm.

== Distribution ==
Fossils have been found in Eocene strata in the Paris Basin, France.
