= List of Rhyncolus species =

This is a list of 149 species in Rhyncolus, a genus of true weevils in the family Curculionidae.

== Rhyncolus species ==
- Rhyncolus affinis Wollaston, T.V., 1861^{c}
- Rhyncolus angularis LeConte, 1858^{i c}
- Rhyncolus angustatus Boheman, 1838^{c}
- Rhyncolus angusticollis Reitter, E., 1896^{c}
- Rhyncolus angustus Fairmaire, L., 1859^{c}
- Rhyncolus appenhageni Uyttenboogaart, D.L., 1930^{c}
- Rhyncolus asperipennis Hustache, 1936^{c}
- Rhyncolus ater Motschulsky, V. de, 1866^{c}
- Rhyncolus australis Erichson, 1842^{c}
- Rhyncolus bhutanensis Osella, 1989^{c}
- Rhyncolus bonnairei Hoffmann, 1938^{c}
- Rhyncolus brachyrhinus Montrouzier, X., 1860^{c}
- Rhyncolus brevicornis Wollaston, T.V., 1873^{c}
- Rhyncolus brevis Boheman, 1845^{c}
- Rhyncolus brunneus Mannerheim, 1843^{i c b}
- Rhyncolus burgeoni Hustache, 1934^{c}
- Rhyncolus californicus Wollaston, T.V., 1873^{c b}
- Rhyncolus calvus Wollaston, T.V., 1860^{c}
- Rhyncolus capitulus Wollaston, T.V., 1858^{c}
- Rhyncolus carinatus Blatchley & Leng, 1916^{c}
- Rhyncolus castaneipennis Voss, 1956^{c}
- Rhyncolus caulium Wollaston, T.V., 1861^{c}
- Rhyncolus cercocarpus (Thatcher, 1940)^{i g b}
- Rhyncolus chinensis Voss, 1953^{c}
- Rhyncolus chiriquensis Champion, G.C., 1909^{c}
- Rhyncolus chloropus Dejean, 1821^{c}
- Rhyncolus cloropus Germar, 1817^{c}
- Rhyncolus compressus Wollaston, T.V., 1860^{c}
- Rhyncolus corticalis Boheman, 1845^{c}
- Rhyncolus cossonoides Csiki, E., 1936^{c}
- Rhyncolus crassirostris Dejean, 1821^{c}
- Rhyncolus cribripennis Gräells, 1858^{c}
- Rhyncolus culinaris Dejean, 1821^{c}
- Rhyncolus curvistriatus Zherikhin in Zherikhin & Egorov, 1990^{c}
- Rhyncolus cylindricollis Wollaston, 1873^{i c b}
- Rhyncolus cylindricus Boheman, 1838^{c}
- Rhyncolus cylindrirostris Dejean, 1821^{c}
- Rhyncolus cylindrus Boheman, 1838^{c}
- Rhyncolus dalmatinus Desbr., 1892^{c}
- Rhyncolus depressus Csiki, E., 1936^{c}
- Rhyncolus dilatatus Casey, 1892^{i c b}
- Rhyncolus dilucidus Voss, 1953^{c}
- Rhyncolus discors Casey, 1892^{i c b}
- Rhyncolus dorsalis LeConte, 1858^{i c}
- Rhyncolus dufaui Hustache, 1932^{c}
- Rhyncolus ebeninus Csiki, E., 1936^{c}
- Rhyncolus elongatus Dejean, 1821^{c g}
- Rhyncolus elumbis Boheman, 1838^{c}
- Rhyncolus encaustes Boheman, C.H. in Schönherr, C.J., 1838^{c}
- Rhyncolus encaustus Boheman, 1838^{c}
- Rhyncolus euphorbiarum Wollaston, T.V., 1867^{c}
- Rhyncolus exiguus Boheman, 1838^{c}
- Rhyncolus fallax Csiki, E., 1936^{c}
- Rhyncolus falsosus Hoffmann, 1965^{c}
- Rhyncolus ferrugineus Waltl, 1839^{c}
- Rhyncolus filiformis Boheman, 1838^{c}
- Rhyncolus filum Chevrolat, L.A.A., 1880^{c}
- Rhyncolus fuscicollis Marshall, 1931^{c}
- Rhyncolus fusiformis Wollaston, T.V., 1873^{c}
- Rhyncolus globulipennis Chevrolat,^{c}
- Rhyncolus gracilis Rosensch., 1856^{c}
- Rhyncolus grandicollis Ch. Bris. In Grenier, 1863^{c}
- Rhyncolus hervei Allard, 1868^{c}
- Rhyncolus himalayensis Stebbing, 1914^{c}
- Rhyncolus hispidulus Fairmaire, 1849^{c}
- Rhyncolus hispidus Csiki, E., 1936^{c}
- Rhyncolus hopffgarteni Stierlin, W.G., 1884^{c}
- Rhyncolus hustachei Csiki, E., 1936^{c}
- Rhyncolus incertus Osella, 1989^{c}
- Rhyncolus kathrynae Sleeper, 1968^{c}
- Rhyncolus kenyae Hustache, 1929^{c}
- Rhyncolus kivuanus Hustache, 1934^{c}
- Rhyncolus knowltoni (Thatcher, 1940)^{i g}
- Rhyncolus laevis Hoffmann, 1965^{c}
- Rhyncolus laeviusculus Wollaston, T.V., 1873^{c}
- Rhyncolus latinasus Say, T., 1831^{c}
- Rhyncolus latitarsis Thomson, C.G., 1886^{c}
- Rhyncolus lauri Gyllenhal, 1838^{c}
- Rhyncolus laurineus Wollaston, T.V., 1861^{c}
- Rhyncolus lignarius Stephens, 1829^{c}
- Rhyncolus linearis Boheman, 1845^{c}
- Rhyncolus longicollis Boheman, 1838^{c}
- Rhyncolus longulus Boheman, C.H., 1859^{c}
- Rhyncolus macrops Buchanan, 1946^{i c b}
- Rhyncolus marginalis Csiki, E., 1936^{c}
- Rhyncolus maynei Hustache, 1934^{c}
- Rhyncolus meruensis Hoffmann, 1965^{c}
- Rhyncolus minor ^{b}
- Rhyncolus minutulus Hoffmann, 1965^{c}
- Rhyncolus montivagus Champion, G.C., 1909^{c}
- Rhyncolus nigripes Reitter, E., 1901^{c}
- Rhyncolus nimius Casey, 1892^{i c}
- Rhyncolus nitidulus Boheman, 1838^{c}
- Rhyncolus nossibianus Hustache, 1922^{c}
- Rhyncolus obesulus Wollaston, T.V., 1867^{c}
- Rhyncolus obsoletus Fauv.,^{c}
- Rhyncolus opacus Karsch, 1881^{i c}
- Rhyncolus oregonensis Horn, 1873^{i c b}
- Rhyncolus oryzae Gyllenhal, 1838^{c}
- Rhyncolus pallens Casey, 1892^{i c b}
- Rhyncolus persimilis Hustache, 1933^{c}
- Rhyncolus piceus Stephens, 1831^{c}
- Rhyncolus plebejus Boheman, 1838^{c}
- Rhyncolus porcatus Schoenherr, 1838^{c}
- Rhyncolus praeustus Boheman, 1838^{c}
- Rhyncolus procer Boheman, 1838^{c}
- Rhyncolus protensus Wollaston, T.V., 1873^{c}
- Rhyncolus protractus Horn, G.H., 1873^{c}
- Rhyncolus pulvereus LeConte, 1850^{c}
- Rhyncolus punctatulus Dejean, 1821^{c}
- Rhyncolus punctatus Wollaston, T.V., 1873^{c}
- Rhyncolus puncticollis Dejean, 1821^{c}
- Rhyncolus punctulatus Lea, A.M., 1896^{c}
- Rhyncolus pyrenaeus Dufour, 1843^{c}
- Rhyncolus quercicolus Boheman, 1845^{c}
- Rhyncolus reflexus Boheman, 1838^{c}
- Rhyncolus regularis Hustache, 1932^{c}
- Rhyncolus relictus Casey, T.L., 1892^{c}
- Rhyncolus rufipennis Montrouzier, X., 1860^{c}
- Rhyncolus samoanus Marshall, 1931^{c}
- Rhyncolus schoenherri Hochhuth, 1847^{c}
- Rhyncolus schönherri Hochhuth, I.H., 1847^{c}
- Rhyncolus sculpturatus Waltl, 1839^{c}
- Rhyncolus similis Wollaston, T.V., 1873^{c}
- Rhyncolus simplicipes Wollaston, T.V., 1861^{c}
- Rhyncolus simulans Hoffmann, 1965^{c}
- Rhyncolus sitoniformis Zherikhin, 1992^{c}
- Rhyncolus spretus Casey, 1892^{i c b}
- Rhyncolus stacesmithi Sleeper, 1953^{i c b}
- Rhyncolus stlembus Schoenherr,^{c}
- Rhyncolus strangulatus Perris, 1852^{g}
- Rhyncolus submuricatus Schoenherr, 1832^{c}
- Rhyncolus sulcatus Dejean, 1821^{c}
- Rhyncolus sulcipennis Wollaston, T.V., 1854^{c}
- Rhyncolus sulcirostris Dejean, 1821^{c}
- Rhyncolus syriacus Desbr., 1892^{c}
- Rhyncolus taciturnus Motschulsky, V. de, 1866^{c}
- Rhyncolus tenuirostris Creutzer,^{c}
- Rhyncolus tenuis Gemminger, M., 1871^{c}
- Rhyncolus teretirostris Klug, 1834^{c}
- Rhyncolus thomsoni Grill, 1896^{c}
- Rhyncolus trivialis Boheman, 1838^{c}
- Rhyncolus troglodytes Boheman, 1838^{c}
- Rhyncolus truncorum Stephens, 1831^{c}
- Rhyncolus turbatus Reitter, E., 1887^{c}
- Rhyncolus ulkei Horn, G.H., 1873^{c}
- Rhyncolus usambaricus Voss, E., 1934^{c}
- Rhyncolus velutinus Dejean, 1821^{c}
- Rhyncolus winkleri Formánek, 1912^{c}

Data sources: i = ITIS, c = Catalogue of Life, g = GBIF, b = Bugguide.net
