= Discors =

Discors may refer to:

- Alvania discors, species of minute sea snail
- Amara discors, species of seed-eating ground beetle
- Archithosia discors, species of moth
- Bathytoma discors, species of sea snail
- Bebearia discors, species of butterfly
- Calosoma discors, species of ground beetle
- Chlamydastis discors, species of moth
- Crassispira discors, species of sea snail
- Cymus discors, species of true bug
- Eugenia discors, species of plant
- Fishia discors, species of cutworm
- Hellinsia discors, species of moth
- Iridomyrmex discors, species of ant
- Lirularia discors, species of sea snail
- Musculus discors, species of bivalve mollusc
- Parepalpus discors, species of tachinid flies
- Podiceps discors, species of grebe
- Rhyncolus discors, species of true weevil
- Spatula discors, species of bird
- Discors (bivalve), a cockle genus
