= Gymnomma diaphnoides =

Scientific classification
- Kingdom: Animalia
- Phylum: Arthropoda
- Class: Insecta
- Order: Diptera
- Family: Tachinidae
- Subfamily: Tachininae
- Tribe: Tachinini
- Genus: Gymnomma
- Species: G. diaphnoides

Binomial name
- Gymnomma diaphnoides Curran, 1925

Species of fly

Gymnomma diaphnoides is a species of tachinid flies in the genus Parepalpus of the family Tachinidae.

== Distribution ==
Brazil.
