= Crassispira flavocarinata =

Scientific classification
- Kingdom: Animalia
- Phylum: Mollusca
- Class: Gastropoda
- Subclass: Caenogastropoda
- Order: Neogastropoda
- Superfamily: Conoidea
- Family: Pseudomelatomidae
- Genus: Crassispira
- Species: C. flavocarinata

Binomial name
- Crassispira flavocarinata (E.A. Smith, 1882)

Synonyms
- Pleurotoma (Crassispira) flavocarinata E.A. Smith, 1882

Species of gastropod

Crassispira flavocarinata is a species of sea snail, a marine gastropod mollusk in the family Pseudomelatomidae.

== Description ==
The length of the shell attains 12 mm, its diameter 5 mm.

The ovate shell contains 9 whorls. The uniform deep brown or chestnut colour, the very stout yellow keel around the upper part of the whorls, and the little numerous ribs on the lower are the principal characteristics. The keel is edged above, or, in other words, is not quite contiguous with the suture. The sculpture is very like that of Crassispira discors (Sowerby I, 1834)

== Distribution ==
This marine species occurs off Panama.
