= Chlamydastis strabonia =

Scientific classification
- Kingdom: Animalia
- Phylum: Arthropoda
- Clade: Pancrustacea
- Class: Insecta
- Order: Lepidoptera
- Family: Depressariidae
- Genus: Chlamydastis
- Species: C. strabonia

Binomial name
- Chlamydastis strabonia (Meyrick, 1930)

Synonyms
- Ptilogenes strabonia Meyrick, 1930

Species of moth

Chlamydastis strabonia is a moth in the family Depressariidae. It was described by Edward Meyrick in 1930. It is found in Pará, Brazil.
