= Chlamydastis ungulifera =

Scientific classification
- Kingdom: Animalia
- Phylum: Arthropoda
- Clade: Pancrustacea
- Class: Insecta
- Order: Lepidoptera
- Family: Depressariidae
- Genus: Chlamydastis
- Species: C. ungulifera

Binomial name
- Chlamydastis ungulifera (Meyrick, 1929)

Synonyms
- Ptilogenes ungulifera Meyrick, 1929

Species of moth

Chlamydastis ungulifera is a moth in the family Depressariidae. It was described by Edward Meyrick in 1929. It is found in Colombia.
