= Chlamydastis argocymba =

Scientific classification
- Kingdom: Animalia
- Phylum: Arthropoda
- Clade: Pancrustacea
- Class: Insecta
- Order: Lepidoptera
- Family: Depressariidae
- Genus: Chlamydastis
- Species: C. argocymba

Binomial name
- Chlamydastis argocymba (Meyrick, 1926)

Synonyms
- Ptilogenes argocymba Meyrick, 1926

Species of moth

Chlamydastis argocymba is a moth of the family Depressariidae. It is found in Brazil.

The wingspan is 16–19 mm. The forewings are greyish-ochreous or light fuscous, sprinkled darker and with an elongate semi-oval white costal blotch extending from one-fifth to near the apex, margined beneath by dark fuscous suffusion. There is a toothed whitish-ochreous line around the apex and termen, the indentations filled with dark fuscous suffusion. The hindwings are grey.
