= Chlamydastis mendoron =

Scientific classification
- Kingdom: Animalia
- Phylum: Arthropoda
- Clade: Pancrustacea
- Class: Insecta
- Order: Lepidoptera
- Family: Depressariidae
- Genus: Chlamydastis
- Species: C. mendoron

Binomial name
- Chlamydastis mendoron (Busck, 1911)

Synonyms
- Stenoma mendoron Busck, 1911

Species of moth

Chlamydastis mendoron is a moth in the family Depressariidae. It was described by August Busck in 1911. It is found in French Guiana and Panama.

The wingspan is 24–26 mm. The forewings are white sprinkled liberally with light brown and with three equidistant small, black costal spots, the outer two most prominent, all edged with brown. At the end of the cell a short deep black transverse dash is preceded by a brown spot and from this a perpendicular brown streak runs down to the dorsal edge just before the tornus. At apical fifth a pre-marginal line of brown spots runs parallel with the termen. The hindwings are triangular dark brown. Females have somewhat lighter hindwings.
