= Gymnomma =

Scientific classification
- Kingdom: Animalia
- Phylum: Arthropoda
- Class: Insecta
- Order: Diptera
- Family: Tachinidae
- Subfamily: Tachininae
- Tribe: Tachinini
- Genus: Gymnomma; Wulp, 1888

Type species
- Gymnomma nitidiventris Wulp, 1888

Genus of flies

Gymnomma is a genus of flies in the family Tachinidae.

== Species ==
- Gymnomma diaphnoides Curran, 1925
- Gymnomma nitidiventris Wulp, 1888
- Gymnomma novum Giglio-Tos, 1893
