= Chlamydastis mochlopa =

Scientific classification
- Kingdom: Animalia
- Phylum: Arthropoda
- Clade: Pancrustacea
- Class: Insecta
- Order: Lepidoptera
- Family: Depressariidae
- Genus: Chlamydastis
- Species: C. mochlopa

Binomial name
- Chlamydastis mochlopa (Meyrick, 1915)

Synonyms
- Agriophara mochlopa Meyrick, 1915

Species of moth

Chlamydastis mochlopa is a moth in the family Depressariidae. It was described by Edward Meyrick in 1915. It is found in Guyana.

The wingspan is about 40 mm (1.6 in). The forewings are white, sprinkled with fuscous and a small dark fuscous spot on the base of the costa. There is an irregular cloudy fuscous line from one-fifth of the costa to one-third of the dorsum, strongly curved outwards and angulated below the middle. A white tuft is found on the fold before the middle of the wing, tinged with fuscous posteriorly, and a larger one in the disc beyond the middle and there is a dark fuscous spot on the costa before the middle, connected by two blackish dots with a strong rather oblique black bar in the disc at two-thirds, where a row of three or four undefined dots of black irroration runs obliquely inwards towards the dorsum and there is a larger fuscous spot on the costa at two-thirds connected by a curved series of three small spots with a transverse fuscous blotch resting on the dorsum before the tornus and there is a submarginal series of three or four subconfluent fuscous dots sprinkled with dark fuscous before the lower half of the termen. An interrupted fuscous marginal line is found around the apex and termen. The hindwings are grey.
