= Chlamydastis perducta =

Scientific classification
- Kingdom: Animalia
- Phylum: Arthropoda
- Clade: Pancrustacea
- Class: Insecta
- Order: Lepidoptera
- Family: Depressariidae
- Genus: Chlamydastis
- Species: C. perducta

Binomial name
- Chlamydastis perducta (Meyrick, 1916)

Synonyms
- Agriophara perducta Meyrick, 1916

Species of moth

Chlamydastis perducta is a moth of the family Depressariidae. It is found in French Guiana.

The wingspan is 24–26 mm for males and 34–36 mm for males. The forewings are white, with some very minute scattered dark grey specks and with small oblique blackish spots on the costa at one-fourth, the middle and three-fourths. The discal stigmata are blackish, projecting from the upper edge of a blackish median longitudinal streak from the base, almost interrupted by an oblique indentation of the upper edge, beneath the second discal stigma, beyond the cell somewhat bent down and running to the termen above the tornus, connected with the tornus by a short curved blackish line and almost interrupted beyond this. There are faint obliquely curved transverse lines of greyish dots rising from the three costal spots, and a fourth close before the termen. There are also some indistinct grey terminal dots. The hindwings are grey.
