= Chlamydastis crateroptila =

Scientific classification
- Kingdom: Animalia
- Phylum: Arthropoda
- Clade: Pancrustacea
- Class: Insecta
- Order: Lepidoptera
- Family: Depressariidae
- Genus: Chlamydastis
- Species: C. crateroptila

Binomial name
- Chlamydastis crateroptila (Meyrick, 1918)

Synonyms
- Ptilogenes crateroptila Meyrick, 1918

Species of moth

Chlamydastis crateroptila is a moth in the family Depressariidae. It was described by Edward Meyrick in 1918. It is found in French Guiana.

The wingspan is about 14 mm. The forewings are white, slightly and very minutely speckled ochreous-grey and with a grey spot on the base of the costa and there is a dark grey spot on the costa at one-third, where some grey suffusion extends towards the base and there is a larger spot on the costa beyond the middle, the upper half dark grey, the lower greyish-ochreous and there are strong transverse whitish ridge-tufts above and below the middle at one-fourth. Two transversely placed confluent dots of grey irroration indicate the first discal stigma, extended by a grey shade to the dorsum and the second discal stigma is dot-like and blackish, with a transverse blotch of pale greyish-ochreous suffusion between this and the first, as well as a faint blotch of pale grey suffusion beyond this, and another on the dorsum beneath it. A hardly sinuate direct fine grey line runs from three-fourths of the costa to the dorsum before the tornus and the terminal area beyond this is suffused grey, in the disc irregularly sprinkled blackish. The hindwings are grey, anteriorly suffused whitish.
