= Chlamydastis spectrophthalma =

Scientific classification
- Kingdom: Animalia
- Phylum: Arthropoda
- Clade: Pancrustacea
- Class: Insecta
- Order: Lepidoptera
- Family: Depressariidae
- Genus: Chlamydastis
- Species: C. spectrophthalma

Binomial name
- Chlamydastis spectrophthalma (Meyrick, 1932)

Synonyms
- Stenoma spectrophthalma Meyrick, 1932

Species of moth

Chlamydastis spectrophthalma is a moth in the family Depressariidae. It was described by Edward Meyrick in 1932. It is found in Bolivia.
