= Chlamydastis habrolepis =

Scientific classification
- Kingdom: Animalia
- Phylum: Arthropoda
- Clade: Pancrustacea
- Class: Insecta
- Order: Lepidoptera
- Family: Depressariidae
- Genus: Chlamydastis
- Species: C. habrolepis

Binomial name
- Chlamydastis habrolepis Blanchard & Knudson, 1986

Species of moth

Chlamydastis habrolepis is a moth in the family Depressariidae. It was described by André Blanchard and Edward C. Knudson in 1986. It is found in North America, where it has been recorded from southern Texas.
