= Chlamydastis inspectrix =

Scientific classification
- Kingdom: Animalia
- Phylum: Arthropoda
- Clade: Pancrustacea
- Class: Insecta
- Order: Lepidoptera
- Family: Depressariidae
- Genus: Chlamydastis
- Species: C. inspectrix

Binomial name
- Chlamydastis inspectrix (Meyrick, 1916)

Synonyms
- Agriophara inspectrix Meyrick, 1916

Species of moth

Chlamydastis inspectrix is a moth of the family Depressariidae. It is found in Brazil and the Guianas.

The wingspan is 17–18 mm. The forewings are white, irregularly and suffusedly irrorated with pale fuscous and with a small fuscous transverse mark on the base of the costa, and small cloudy fuscous spots on the costa at one-fourth, the middle and three-fourths. The discal stigmata are minute and black, the plical forming a conspicuous raised roundish black spot. There is an indistinct irregular light fuscous line from the last costal spot to the dorsum before the tornus and an oval brown blotch marked with black on the veins extending over the apex and termen to below the middle. There is also a terminal row of blackish dots. The hindwings are blackish-grey.
