= Chlamydastis melanonca =

Scientific classification
- Kingdom: Animalia
- Phylum: Arthropoda
- Clade: Pancrustacea
- Class: Insecta
- Order: Lepidoptera
- Family: Depressariidae
- Genus: Chlamydastis
- Species: C. melanonca

Binomial name
- Chlamydastis melanonca (Meyrick, 1915)

Synonyms
- Agriophara melanonca Meyrick, 1915

Species of moth

Chlamydastis melanonca is a moth in the family Depressariidae. It was described by Edward Meyrick in 1915. It is found in Guyana.

The wingspan is about 21 mm. The forewings are white, with scattered grey specks and a small blackish mark on the base of the costa and three blackish spots on the costa, where rise faint lines of grey irroration, the first from one-fifth of the costa, oblique, obsolete below the middle, the second from before the middle of the costa very obliquely outwards, bent and passing behind the discal mark to the fold, obsolete on the dorsum, the third from two-thirds of the costa to the dorsum before the tornus, curved outwards on the upper half. A white tuft is found on the fold representing the plical stigma and there is a rather oblique strong black linear mark on the end of the cell, edged anteriorly with raised white scales. There is a curved series of faint small cloudy fuscous spots near the apical and terminal margin, one below the middle of the termen larger and more conspicuous. There are some small marginal dots of fuscous irroration around the apex and termen. The hindwings are grey, paler towards the base.
