= Chlamydastis ophiopa =

Scientific classification
- Kingdom: Animalia
- Phylum: Arthropoda
- Clade: Pancrustacea
- Class: Insecta
- Order: Lepidoptera
- Family: Depressariidae
- Genus: Chlamydastis
- Species: C. ophiopa

Binomial name
- Chlamydastis ophiopa (Meyrick, 1916)

Synonyms
- Agriophara ophiopa Meyrick, 1916

Species of moth

Chlamydastis ophiopa is a moth of the family Depressariidae. It is found in French Guiana.

The wingspan is 26–28 mm. The forewings are brown, irregularly mixed and sprinkled with white and black and with a dark brown spot on the middle of the costa, preceded by whitish suffusion, and followed by a very irregular oblique white streak reaching half across the wing, this followed by a dark fuscous streak becoming a blackish spot on the costa, beyond which is a fine curved whitish subterminal line enlarged into a white mark on the lower portion, and leaving a narrow terminal fascia reddish-brown more or less mixed with blackish. The second discal stigma is raised, black and edged with white anteriorly. There is an irregular whitish-ochreous line from the fold before the middle of the wing to the dorsum. The hindwings are dark grey.
