= Rhyncolus cercocarpus =

Scientific classification
- Kingdom: Animalia
- Phylum: Arthropoda
- Clade: Pancrustacea
- Class: Insecta
- Order: Coleoptera
- Suborder: Polyphaga
- Infraorder: Cucujiformia
- Superfamily: Curculionoidea
- Family: Curculionidae
- Genus: Rhyncolus
- Species: R. cercocarpus

Binomial name
- Rhyncolus cercocarpus (Thatcher, 1940)

Species of beetle

Rhyncolus cercocarpus is a species of true weevil in the beetle family Curculionidae. It is found in North America.
