= Chlamydastis truncatula =

Scientific classification
- Kingdom: Animalia
- Phylum: Arthropoda
- Clade: Pancrustacea
- Class: Insecta
- Order: Lepidoptera
- Family: Depressariidae
- Genus: Chlamydastis
- Species: C. truncatula

Binomial name
- Chlamydastis truncatula (Meyrick, 1913)

Synonyms
- Agriophara truncatula Meyrick, 1913

Species of moth

Chlamydastis truncatula is a moth in the family Depressariidae. It was described by Edward Meyrick in 1913. It is found in Venezuela.

The wingspan is 15–17 mm. The forewings are pale ochreous, sometimes brownish-tinged on the dorsal half and a small suffused brown basal patch, darker and more defined towards the costa. There are three oblique dark brown marks on the costa between this and the middle, as well as an irregular brown fascia at three-fourths, on the costal half irregularly dilated anteriorly and edged posteriorly with whitish, on the dorsum preceded by a suffused blackish spot. The disc is sometimes marked with indistinct longitudinal brownish lines and there is a tuft of scales on the fascia indicating the second discal stigma. The terminal area is sometimes sprinkled with dark fuscous and there is a suffused brown streak along the posterior part of the costa and termen, sometimes obscurely spotted with dark fuscous or blackish. The hindwings are pale greyish males and grey in females.
