= Chlamydastis platyspora =

Scientific classification
- Kingdom: Animalia
- Phylum: Arthropoda
- Clade: Pancrustacea
- Class: Insecta
- Order: Lepidoptera
- Family: Depressariidae
- Genus: Chlamydastis
- Species: C. platyspora

Binomial name
- Chlamydastis platyspora (Meyrick, 1932)

Synonyms
- Ptilogenes platyspora Meyrick, 1932; Ptilogenes amblystoma Meyrick, 1936

Species of moth

Chlamydastis platyspora is a moth in the family Depressariidae. It was described by Edward Meyrick in 1932. It is found in Brazil.

The larvae feed on Roupala montana.
