= Chlamydastis gemina =

Scientific classification
- Kingdom: Animalia
- Phylum: Arthropoda
- Clade: Pancrustacea
- Class: Insecta
- Order: Lepidoptera
- Family: Depressariidae
- Genus: Chlamydastis
- Species: C. gemina

Binomial name
- Chlamydastis gemina (Zeller, 1855)

Synonyms
- Cryptolechia gemina Zeller, 1855

Species of moth

Chlamydastis gemina is a moth in the family Depressariidae. It was described by Philipp Christoph Zeller in 1855. It is found in Colombia.
