= Gymnomma nitidiventris =

Scientific classification
- Domain: Eukaryota
- Kingdom: Animalia
- Phylum: Arthropoda
- Class: Insecta
- Order: Diptera
- Family: Tachinidae
- Genus: Gymnomma
- Species: G. nitidiventris

Binomial name
- Gymnomma nitidiventris Wulp, 1888

Species of fly

Gymnomma nitidiventris is a species of tachinid flies in the genus Gymnomma of the family Tachinidae.
