= Chlamydastis squamosa =

Scientific classification
- Kingdom: Animalia
- Phylum: Arthropoda
- Clade: Pancrustacea
- Class: Insecta
- Order: Lepidoptera
- Family: Depressariidae
- Genus: Chlamydastis
- Species: C. squamosa

Binomial name
- Chlamydastis squamosa (Walsingham, [1892])

Synonyms
- Diastoma squamosa Walsingham, [1892]

Species of moth

Chlamydastis squamosa is a moth in the family Depressariidae. It was described by Lord Walsingham in 1892 and is found in the West Indies.

The wingspan is about 19 mm. The forewings are white, faintly speckled with pale umber-brown and with three dark brown costal marks containing some blackish scales. The first at one-fourth from the base, giving rise to a very inconspicuous sinuate and outwardly oblique line of brownish scales, some of which are raised, the second at about the middle of the wing, also gives rise to an outwardly oblique line of brown scales containing raised blackish tufts, this is developed into a conspicuous spot at the end of the cell, and beneath it nearer to the base is a much smaller spot of similar raised scales, this line is not continued to the dorsal margin. From the third costal spot, which is at three-fourths of the wing-length, a more continuous but slender line of mixed brown and black scales, some slightly raised, curves outwards above the middle of the wing and is bent back to the anal angle. Beyond it, but below the middle of the apical margin, is a spot of similar colour, above which are a few scattered brownish scales along the margin. The hindwings are yellowish white.
