= Chlamydastis metacystis =

Scientific classification
- Kingdom: Animalia
- Phylum: Arthropoda
- Clade: Pancrustacea
- Class: Insecta
- Order: Lepidoptera
- Family: Depressariidae
- Genus: Chlamydastis
- Species: C. metacystis

Binomial name
- Chlamydastis metacystis (Meyrick, 1918)

Synonyms
- Ptilogenes metacystis Meyrick, 1918

Species of moth

Chlamydastis metacystis is a moth in the family Depressariidae. It was described by Edward Meyrick in 1918. It is found in French Guiana.

The wingspan is 14–17 mm. The forewings are whitish, more or less speckled fuscous. The stigmata are small, raised and black, the plical obliquely beyond the first discal and there are indistinct small grey spots on the costa at one-fourth and before the middle, and on the dorsum beyond the middle. An oval brown blotch, anteriorly suffused dark brown and sprinkled black, extending over the termen from above the apex to near the tornus. The hindwings of the males are ochreous-whitish, posteriorly tinged grey. The hindwings of the females are grey.
