= Chlamydastis =

Scientific classification
- Kingdom: Animalia
- Phylum: Arthropoda
- Class: Insecta
- Order: Lepidoptera
- Family: Depressariidae
- Subfamily: Stenomatinae
- Genus: Chlamydastis; Meyrick, 1916

Synonyms
- Ptilogenes Meyrick, 1917

Genus of moths

Chlamydastis is a genus of moths in the subfamily Stenomatinae.

== Species ==
- Chlamydastis acronitis (Busck, 1911)
- Chlamydastis anamochla (Meyrick, 1929)
- Chlamydastis amblystoma (Meyrick, 1936) (from Rio Grande do Sul)
- Chlamydastis ancalota (Meyrick, 1916)
- Chlamydastis apoclina Meyrick, 1929
- Chlamydastis arenaria (Walsingham, 1913)
- Chlamydastis argocymba (Meyrick, 1926)
- Chlamydastis batrachopis (Meyrick, 1913)
- Chlamydastis bifida (Meyrick, 1916)
- Chlamydastis byssophanes (Meyrick, 1926)
- Chlamydastis caecata (Meyrick, 1916)
- Chlamydastis chionoptila (Meyrick, 1926)
- Chlamydastis chionosphena (Meyrick, 1931)
- Chlamydastis chlorosticta (Meyrick, 1913)
- Chlamydastis complexa (Meyrick, 1916)
- Chlamydastis crateroptila (Meyrick, 1918)
- Chlamydastis curviliniella (Busck, 1914)
- Chlamydastis cystiodes (Meyrick, 1916)
- Chlamydastis deflexa (Meyrick, 1916)
- Chlamydastis deflua (Meyrick, 1918)
- Chlamydastis discors (Meyrick, 1913)
- Chlamydastis disticha (Meyrick, 1916)
- Chlamydastis dominicae Duckworth, 1969
- Chlamydastis dryosphaera (Meyrick, 1926)
- Chlamydastis elaeostola (Meyrick, 1930)
- Chlamydastis epophrysta (Meyrick, 1909)
- Chlamydastis forcipata (Meyrick, 1913)
- Chlamydastis fragmentella (Dognin, 1914)
- Chlamydastis funicularis (Meyrick, 1926)
- Chlamydastis galeomorpha (Meyrick, 1931)
- Chlamydastis gemina (Zeller, 1855)
- Chlamydastis habrolepis Blanchard & Knudson, 1986
- Chlamydastis hemichlora (Meyrick, 1916)
- Chlamydastis ichthyodes (Meyrick, 1926)
- Chlamydastis illita (Meyrick, 1926)
- Chlamydastis inscitum (Busck, 1911)
- Chlamydastis inspectrix (Meyrick, 1916)
- Chlamydastis lactis (Busck, 1911)
- Chlamydastis leptobelisca (Meyrick, 1929)
- Chlamydastis leucoplasta (Meyrick, 1926)
- Chlamydastis leucoptila (Meyrick, 1918)
- Chlamydastis lichenias (Meyrick, 1916)
- Chlamydastis lithograpta (Meyrick, 1913)
- Chlamydastis melanometra (Meyrick, 1926)
- Chlamydastis melanonca (Meyrick, 1915)
- Chlamydastis mendoron (Busck, 1911)
- Chlamydastis metacymba (Meyrick, 1916)
- Chlamydastis metacystis (Meyrick, 1918)
- Chlamydastis metamochla (Meyrick, 1931)
- Chlamydastis mochlopa (Meyrick, 1915)
- Chlamydastis molinella (Stoll, [1781])
- Chlamydastis monastra (Meyrick, 1909)
- Chlamydastis morbida (Zeller, 1877)
- Chlamydastis mysticopis (Meyrick, 1926)
- Chlamydastis nestes (Busck, 1911)
- Chlamydastis obnupta (Meyrick, 1916)
- Chlamydastis ommatopa (Meyrick, 1926)
- Chlamydastis ophiopa (Meyrick, 1916)
- Chlamydastis orion (Busck, 1920)
- Chlamydastis oxyplaga (Meyrick, 1929)
- Chlamydastis paradromis (Meyrick, 1915)
- Chlamydastis perducta (Meyrick, 1916)
- Chlamydastis phasmatopa (Meyrick, 1910)
- Chlamydastis phytoptera (Busck, 1914)
- Chlamydastis platyspora (Meyrick, 1932)
- Chlamydastis plocogramma (Meyrick, 1915)
- Chlamydastis poliopa (Meyrick, 1916)
- Chlamydastis praenubila (Meyrick, 1926)
- Chlamydastis prudentula (Meyrick, 1926)
- Chlamydastis ptilopa (Meyrick, 1913)
- Chlamydastis rhomaeopa (Meyrick, 1931)
- Chlamydastis scutellata (Meyrick, 1916)
- Chlamydastis smodicopa (Meyrick, 1915)
- Chlamydastis spectrophthalma (Meyrick, 1932)
- Chlamydastis squamosa (Walsingham, [1892])
- Chlamydastis stagnicolor (Meyrick, 1926)
- Chlamydastis steloglypta (Meyrick, 1931)
- Chlamydastis strabonia (Meyrick, 1930)
- Chlamydastis synedra (Meyrick, 1916)
- Chlamydastis trastices (Busck, 1911)
- Chlamydastis tritypa (Meyrick, 1909)
- Chlamydastis truncatula (Meyrick, 1913)
- Chlamydastis tryphon (Busck, 1920)
- Chlamydastis ungulifera (Meyrick, 1929)
- Chlamydastis xylinaspis (Meyrick, 1915)
