= Chlamydastis synedra =

Scientific classification
- Kingdom: Animalia
- Phylum: Arthropoda
- Clade: Pancrustacea
- Class: Insecta
- Order: Lepidoptera
- Family: Depressariidae
- Genus: Chlamydastis
- Species: C. synedra

Binomial name
- Chlamydastis synedra (Meyrick, 1916)

Synonyms
- Agriophara synedra Meyrick, 1916

Species of moth

Chlamydastis synedra is a moth of the family Depressariidae that lives in Paraguay.

The wingspan is about 18 mm. The forewings are very pale ochreous brown with a small brown spot on the costa at one-fourth, a small faint brown spot towards the dorsum in the middle and three minute groups of raised black and brown scales forming a nearly straight line with these, two representing the first discal and plical stigmata. There is a brown spot on the middle of the costa, where a faintly sinuate row of dark fuscous marks suffused with brown runs to the dorsum before the tornus.

A median black dot represents the second discal stigma and a strongly curved brown line, suffusedly dotted with dark fuscous, from a suffused spot on the costa at three-fourths to the tornus. A thick brown streak, marked with black, runs from the middle of the postmedian line to below the middle of the termen, indistinctly interrupted before the subterminal line. The hindwings are light grey, suffused with white anteriorly.
