= Chlamydastis disticha =

Scientific classification
- Kingdom: Animalia
- Phylum: Arthropoda
- Clade: Pancrustacea
- Class: Insecta
- Order: Lepidoptera
- Family: Depressariidae
- Genus: Chlamydastis
- Species: C. disticha

Binomial name
- Chlamydastis disticha (Meyrick, 1916)

Synonyms
- Agriophara disticha Meyrick, 1916

Species of moth

Chlamydastis disticha is a moth of the family Depressariidae. It is found in French Guiana and Colombia.

The wingspan is about 15 mm. The forewings are brown, with violet reflections and with some white suffusion towards the base of the costa, as well as two indistinct darker transverse lines mixed with blackish specks, the first at two-fifths, curved and rather oblique, the second from three-fifths of the costa to the dorsum before the tornus, strongly curved. There are also two small spots of raised dark grey and black scales on the angles of the cell and a curved shade of dark brown suffusion near the posterior part of the costa and termen. The hindwings are blackish-grey.
