= Chlamydastis tryphon =

Scientific classification
- Kingdom: Animalia
- Phylum: Arthropoda
- Clade: Pancrustacea
- Class: Insecta
- Order: Lepidoptera
- Family: Depressariidae
- Genus: Chlamydastis
- Species: C. tryphon

Binomial name
- Chlamydastis tryphon (Busck, 1920)

Synonyms
- Stenoma tryphon Busck, 1920

Species of moth

Chlamydastis tryphon is a moth in the family Depressariidae. It was described by August Busck in 1920. It is found in Guatemala.

The wingspan is about 19 mm. The forewings are stone white slightly overlaid with light fuscous and with a broad central dark brown fascia, containing a few black scales. This fascia is broadest on the costal and dorsal edges and sharply contracted in the middle by the basal and apical white part of the wing. The hindwings are light whitish fuscous on the basal half, gradually shading to darker fuscous toward the apex.
