= Chlamydastis praenubila =

Scientific classification
- Kingdom: Animalia
- Phylum: Arthropoda
- Clade: Pancrustacea
- Class: Insecta
- Order: Lepidoptera
- Family: Depressariidae
- Genus: Chlamydastis
- Species: C. praenubila

Binomial name
- Chlamydastis praenubila (Meyrick, 1926)

Synonyms
- Ptilogenes praenubila Meyrick, 1926

Species of moth

Chlamydastis praenubila is a moth of the family Depressariidae. It is found in Brazil.

The wingspan is about 14 mm. The forewings are white, suffusedly irrorated grey on the anterior half and thinly speckled posteriorly. There is a fine blackish-grey transverse strigula from the costa very near the base and small grey spots on the costa at one-fourth and the middle, from the first an indistinct grey line with some blackish scales indicating two or three dots, shortly indented near costa, then straight to the dorsum at two-fifths. There is a transverse blackish-grey mark on the end of the cell and near beyond this a transverse blotch of brownish-grey suffusion. A trapezoidal blotch of dark grey suffusion is found on the dorsum beyond the middle, from the costa at three-fourths a blackish-grey line, shortly indented towards the costa, then gently excurved to the posterior angle of this but obsolescent near it. There is a fuscous patch occupying the terminal area beyond this except on a costal spot following it and towards the tornus. The hindwings are dark grey.
