= Rhyncolus cylindricollis =

Scientific classification
- Kingdom: Animalia
- Phylum: Arthropoda
- Clade: Pancrustacea
- Class: Insecta
- Order: Coleoptera
- Suborder: Polyphaga
- Infraorder: Cucujiformia
- Superfamily: Curculionoidea
- Family: Curculionidae
- Genus: Rhyncolus
- Species: R. cylindricollis

Binomial name
- Rhyncolus cylindricollis Wollaston, 1873

Species of beetle

Rhyncolus cylindricollis is a species of true weevil in the beetle family Curculionidae.
