= Chlamydastis dryosphaera =

Scientific classification
- Kingdom: Animalia
- Phylum: Arthropoda
- Clade: Pancrustacea
- Class: Insecta
- Order: Lepidoptera
- Family: Depressariidae
- Genus: Chlamydastis
- Species: C. dryosphaera

Binomial name
- Chlamydastis dryosphaera (Meyrick, 1926)

Synonyms
- Ptilogenes dryosphaera Meyrick, 1926

Species of moth

Chlamydastis dryosphaera is a moth of the family Depressariidae. It is found in Brazil.

The wingspan is about 15 mm. The forewings are white, irregularly strewn very line fuscous speckling, especially towards the middle of the costa, and the posterior part of the dorsum and termen. There are grey suffused spots on the costa at one-fourth and the middle. The plical and second discal stigmata are blackish, between these a roundish brown submedian blotch, margined on the lower half by a larger trapezoidal blotch of grey suffusion resting on the dorsum. Beyond the second discal is a large roundish blotch of grey suffusion, almost confluent with a moderate grey fascia extending around the apex and termen, with indistinct blackish dots around the apical and terminal margin. The hindwings are grey.
