= Chlamydastis fragmentella =

Scientific classification
- Kingdom: Animalia
- Phylum: Arthropoda
- Clade: Pancrustacea
- Class: Insecta
- Order: Lepidoptera
- Family: Depressariidae
- Genus: Chlamydastis
- Species: C. fragmentella

Binomial name
- Chlamydastis fragmentella (Dognin, 1914)

Synonyms
- Stenoma fragmentella Dognin, 1914; Agriophara ponderata Meyrick, 1916

Species of moth

Chlamydastis fragmentella is a moth of the family Depressariidae. It is found in French Guiana and Guyana.

The wingspan is 18–23 mm. The forewings are white, sprinkled with dark grey and black. The markings are black. There are costal and median marks near the base and a slightly oblique transverse line at one-third, obtusely angulated in the middle and sinuate inwards on the lower half. A small spot is found on the middle of the costa, with two marks beneath it. There is also a spot on the costa at three-fourths, containing a whitish costal dot, giving rise to a transverse line curved outwards in the disc and margined anteriorly on the dorsum by a blackish-grey subquadrate blotch reaching nearly half across the wing. There is a downwards-curved line running from the first line above the angle through the middle of the disc to the costal spot of the second line. A series of irregular marks is found near the termen, confluent with spots of dark grey suffusion at the apex and on the middle of the termen. The hindwings are dark grey.
