= Chlamydastis ommatopa =

Scientific classification
- Kingdom: Animalia
- Phylum: Arthropoda
- Clade: Pancrustacea
- Class: Insecta
- Order: Lepidoptera
- Family: Depressariidae
- Genus: Chlamydastis
- Species: C. ommatopa

Binomial name
- Chlamydastis ommatopa (Meyrick, 1926)

Synonyms
- Ptilogenes ommatopa Meyrick, 1926

Species of insect

Chlamydastis ommatopa is a moth of the family Depressariidae. It is found in Colombia and Bolivia.

The wingspan is 26–29 mm. The forewings are light brownish-ochreous, irregularly mixed fuscous or grey and with two irregular fuscous shades from the costa near the base and two about one-fourth, reaching about half across the wing. The plical and second discal stigmata are small and black, the latter placed in a white spot, an indistinct curved dentate-fuscous line from a small spot on the costa in the middle just behind this to the dorsum beyond the middle. There is a chestnut-brown patch occupying the apical third of the wing, with the edge nearly straight but somewhat irregular, partially streaked black between the veins, including above the middle a dark fuscous blotch rounded and white-edged anteriorly but suffused posteriorly, and a curved white line near before the apex and termen. The hindwings are dark grey.
