= Chlamydastis curviliniella =

Scientific classification
- Kingdom: Animalia
- Phylum: Arthropoda
- Clade: Pancrustacea
- Class: Insecta
- Order: Lepidoptera
- Family: Depressariidae
- Genus: Chlamydastis
- Species: C. curviliniella

Binomial name
- Chlamydastis curviliniella (Busck, 1914)

Synonyms
- Catarata curviliniella Busck, 1914

Species of moth

Chlamydastis curviliniella is a moth in the family Depressariidae. It was described by August Busck in 1914. It is found in Panama.

The wingspan is 15–17 mm. The forewings are white faintly mixed with ochreous scales and with black markings. From near the base of the costa runs a thin black line obliquely downward and outward to the middle of the cell and then to the end of the cell, where it curves upward and inward forming an elongated question mark. At the end of the cell this black line is edged by yellow scales and on the middle of the costa is a small, black, outwardly directed spur and at apical third is a similar, inwardly directed black spur. Parallel with the terminal edge at the apical fourth is a faint row of yellowish scales, and in fresh specimens the wing is sparsely sprinkled with black scales. The hindwings are light fuscous.
