= Chlamydastis cystiodes =

Scientific classification
- Kingdom: Animalia
- Phylum: Arthropoda
- Clade: Pancrustacea
- Class: Insecta
- Order: Lepidoptera
- Family: Depressariidae
- Genus: Chlamydastis
- Species: C. cystiodes

Binomial name
- Chlamydastis cystiodes (Meyrick, 1916)

Synonyms
- Agriophara cystiodes Meyrick, 1916

Species of moth

Chlamydastis cystiodes is a moth of the family Depressariidae. It is found in French Guiana.

The wingspan is 16–18 mm. The forewings are light fuscous, suffusedly mixed with white and with the stigmata minute, raised and black, the plical obliquely beyond the first discal. There are small indistinct transverse spots of blackish-grey irroration on the costa at one-fourth and the middle, and on the dorsum beyond the middle. There is an oval dark brown blotch, anteriorly suffused with blackish and edged with white suffusion, extending over the termen from above the apex to the tornus. The hindwings in males are dark grey, while they are blackish in females.
