= Chlamydastis inscitum =

Scientific classification
- Kingdom: Animalia
- Phylum: Arthropoda
- Clade: Pancrustacea
- Class: Insecta
- Order: Lepidoptera
- Family: Depressariidae
- Genus: Chlamydastis
- Species: C. inscitum

Binomial name
- Chlamydastis inscitum (Busck, 1911)

Synonyms
- Stenoma inscitum Busck, 1911; Stenoma inscita Meyrick, 1913

Species of moth

Chlamydastis inscitum is a moth in the family Depressariidae. It was described by August Busck in 1911. It is found in French Guiana.

The wingspan is 19–22 mm. The forewings are whitish fuscous, the ground color being white but strongly and unevenly overlaid with dark fuscous except for a large oblong pure white costal spot reaching from the basal fourth to the apical fourth. At the end of the cell is a dimly indicated darker fuscous spot from which a faint dark fuscous irregular line runs to the dorsal edge near the base. The extreme tip of the wing is dark bronzy brown. The hindwings are dark fuscous.
