= Chlamydastis morbida =

Scientific classification
- Kingdom: Animalia
- Phylum: Arthropoda
- Clade: Pancrustacea
- Class: Insecta
- Order: Lepidoptera
- Family: Depressariidae
- Genus: Chlamydastis
- Species: C. morbida

Binomial name
- Chlamydastis morbida (Zeller, 1877)

Species of moth

Chlamydastis morbida is a moth in the family Depressariidae. It was described by Philipp Christoph Zeller in 1877.
