= Chlamydastis ichthyodes =

Scientific classification
- Kingdom: Animalia
- Phylum: Arthropoda
- Clade: Pancrustacea
- Class: Insecta
- Order: Lepidoptera
- Family: Depressariidae
- Genus: Chlamydastis
- Species: C. ichthyodes

Binomial name
- Chlamydastis ichthyodes (Meyrick, 1926)

Synonyms
- Ptilogenes ichthyodes Meyrick, 1926

Species of moth

Chlamydastis ichthyodes is a moth of the family Depressariidae. It is found in Peru.

The wingspan is about 19 mm. The forewings are dark brown with oblique shades from the costa at the base and one-fifth reaching half across the wing. There is a dark violet-grey oblong blotch along the basal third of the dorsum and a slightly curved bluish-grey fascia crossing the wing just beyond these markings. A dark brown suffused streak is found from beyond the end of the cell inwards-oblique to the fold, with three or four white marks above the median area of the fold. There is a dark brown patch occupying the apical area, margined by a slightly incurved blackish line from the angle of the costa to the tornus, preceded on the lower two-thirds by a grey fascia triangularly expanded towards the dorsum, within this patch some black streaking between the veins, and a roundish blotch indicated by blackish marginal suffusion anteriorly and an obscure whitish curved pre-marginal line posteriorly. The hindwings are dark grey.
