= Chlamydastis molinella =

Scientific classification
- Kingdom: Animalia
- Phylum: Arthropoda
- Clade: Pancrustacea
- Class: Insecta
- Order: Lepidoptera
- Family: Depressariidae
- Genus: Chlamydastis
- Species: C. molinella

Binomial name
- Chlamydastis molinella (Stoll, [1781])

Synonyms
- Phalaena (Tinea) molinella Stoll, [1781]; Stenoma apicalis Busck, 1911

Species of moth

Chlamydastis molinella is a moth in the family Depressariidae. It was described by Caspar Stoll in 1781. It is found in French Guiana.

The wingspan is about 25 mm. The base of the forewings is light golden ocherous with a thin dark brown costal margin and a broader dark dorsal margin. The central two-thirds of the wing are dark brown mixed with bluish white scales, the three upper ones of which are golden ocherous, while the two smaller lower ones have the same color as the surrounding parts. All the tufts, but especially the lower ones, are followed by black scales. The central dark color stops on the edges at the apical fourth, but projects on the middle out into a sharp tongue which reaches the terminal edge and separates two large light golden brown round areas, the upper including apex the lower surrounding tornus. These light terminal areas are sparsely edged with white scales. The hindwings are dark blackish brown.
