= Chlamydastis metacymba =

Scientific classification
- Kingdom: Animalia
- Phylum: Arthropoda
- Clade: Pancrustacea
- Class: Insecta
- Order: Lepidoptera
- Family: Depressariidae
- Genus: Chlamydastis
- Species: C. metacymba

Binomial name
- Chlamydastis metacymba (Meyrick, 1916)

Synonyms
- Agriophara metacymba Meyrick, 1916

Species of moth

Chlamydastis metacymba is a moth of the family Depressariidae. It is found in French Guiana.

The wingspan is about 15 millimetres (0.59 in). The forewings are brownish irrorated with fuscous with some white suffusion towards the costa and dorsum anteriorly. There is a white transverse bar from the dorsum before the middle to the fold. There is an indistinct transverse fuscous mark from the costa beyond one-fourth. There is a thick suffused dark fuscous slightly inwards-oblique streak from the middle of the costa to the fold. The second discal stigma is small and black, placed in an irregular suffused white patch. There is an oval dark fuscous blotch, edged anteriorly by a suffused white streak, extending over the termen from above the apex to near the tornus. The hindwings are dark grey.
