= Parepalpus flavidus =

Scientific classification
- Domain: Eukaryota
- Kingdom: Animalia
- Phylum: Arthropoda
- Class: Insecta
- Order: Diptera
- Family: Tachinidae
- Genus: Parepalpus
- Species: P. flavidus

Binomial name
- Parepalpus flavidus Coquillett, 1902

Species of fly

Parepalpus flavidus is a species of bristle fly in the family Tachinidae. It is found in North America.
