= Chlamydastis trastices =

Scientific classification
- Kingdom: Animalia
- Phylum: Arthropoda
- Clade: Pancrustacea
- Class: Insecta
- Order: Lepidoptera
- Family: Depressariidae
- Genus: Chlamydastis
- Species: C. trastices

Binomial name
- Chlamydastis trastices (Busck, 1911)

Synonyms
- Stenoma trastices Busck, 1911; Agriophara aphrogenes Meyrick, 1915

Species of moth

Chlamydastis trastices is a moth in the family Depressariidae. It was described by August Busck in 1911. It is found in French Guiana and Guyana.

The wingspan is 20–22 mm. The forewings are white, somewhat sprinkled with black and fuscous, the dorsal area suffused with light fuscous or grey and with small blackish spots on the costa at the base and beyond the middle and a quadrate blackish-grey blotch on the costa at one-fourth, as well as a rather inwardly oblique black bar suffused with dark brown on the end of the cell, and a black dot beneath the middle of the disc. A dark brown fascia-like blotch marked with black is found on the veins extending from the costa nearly to the termen before the apex, including an ochreous-whitish spot in its middle, and with a cloudy brown line sprinkled with blackish running from its upper portion near its anterior edge to the tornus. There is an irregular brown line marked with black dots around the apex and termen. The hindwings are grey.
