= Chlamydastis prudentula =

Scientific classification
- Kingdom: Animalia
- Phylum: Arthropoda
- Clade: Pancrustacea
- Class: Insecta
- Order: Lepidoptera
- Family: Depressariidae
- Genus: Chlamydastis
- Species: C. prudentula

Binomial name
- Chlamydastis prudentula (Meyrick, 1926)

Synonyms
- Ptilogenes prudentula Meyrick, 1926

Species of moth

Chlamydastis prudentula is a moth of the family Depressariidae. It is found in Peru.

The wingspan is about 14 mm. The forewings are white, speckled grey and dark grey with a slightly curved shade of dark grey irroration from the costa at one-third to the dorsum at two-fifths, and another somewhat sinuate from the costa at five-sixths to the dorsum before the tornus. The plical and second discal stigmata are black, with a median band of grey suffusion passing between these but not reaching the dorsum. There is a streak of grey-brownish suffusion just before the termen on the upper two-thirds. There is a terminal series of black dots. The hindwings are light grey.
