= Chlamydastis lithograpta =

Scientific classification
- Kingdom: Animalia
- Phylum: Arthropoda
- Clade: Pancrustacea
- Class: Insecta
- Order: Lepidoptera
- Family: Depressariidae
- Genus: Chlamydastis
- Species: C. lithograpta

Binomial name
- Chlamydastis lithograpta (Meyrick, 1913)

Synonyms
- Agriophara lithograpta Meyrick, 1913

Species of moth

Chlamydastis lithograpta is a moth in the family Depressariidae. It was described by Edward Meyrick in 1913. It is found in Peru.

The wingspan is about 25 mm. The forewings are ochreous-white, sprinkled with light greyish-ochreous and with three small blackish spots on the costa at one-fourth, before the middle, and at two-thirds. The first discal stigma is small and black, with an arched pale greyish-ochreous cloud adjacent to it beneath. The plical and second discal are represented by white transverse ridge-tufts, the latter followed by a round pale greyish-ochreous cloud. There is a rather curved cloudy waved pale greyish-ochreous line from the third costal spot to the tornus, and a similar line between this and the termen, as well as two cloudy dark fuscous dots on the costa posteriorly. The hindwings are grey.
