= Chlamydastis xylinaspis =

Scientific classification
- Kingdom: Animalia
- Phylum: Arthropoda
- Clade: Pancrustacea
- Class: Insecta
- Order: Lepidoptera
- Family: Depressariidae
- Genus: Chlamydastis
- Species: C. xylinaspis

Binomial name
- Chlamydastis xylinaspis (Meyrick, 1915)

Synonyms
- Agriophara xylinaspis Meyrick, 1915

Species of moth

Chlamydastis xylinaspis is a moth in the family Depressariidae. It was described by Edward Meyrick in 1915. It is found in Peru.

The wingspan is about 16 mm. The forewings are ochreous-grey, suffused with whitish on the costal half of the median third and a black dot beneath the middle of the wing. There is an inwardly oblique raised black bar on the end of the cell, partially edged with brown. There is also a large rounded rufous-brown apical blotch suffusedly streaked with black, its edge running from the costal prominence to below the middle of the termen. The hindwings are dark grey.
