= Chlamydastis arenaria =

Scientific classification
- Kingdom: Animalia
- Phylum: Arthropoda
- Clade: Pancrustacea
- Class: Insecta
- Order: Lepidoptera
- Family: Depressariidae
- Genus: Chlamydastis
- Species: C. arenaria

Binomial name
- Chlamydastis arenaria (Walsingham, 1913)

Synonyms
- Stenoma arenaria Walsingham, 1913; Stenoma vividella Busck, 1914

Species of moth

Chlamydastis arenaria is a moth in the family Depressariidae. It was described by Lord Walsingham in 1913. It is found in Panama and Brazil (Espirito Santo).

The wingspan is 21–23 mm. The forewings are sandy ochraceous, becoming white toward the apex, with oblique shades of mixed ochreous and greyish brown coming from the costa—the first, at one-fourth from the base, short and broken, terminating in a spot of black scales on the disc. The second, about the middle, somewhat more emphasised, and accompanied by small groups of black scales tending in the direction of an elongate black scale-patch, which reaches to the termen a little below the middle. The third costal shade, arising at about three-fourths, tends outward to below the apex, but is separated by the white ground colour, which also appears between the three oblique shades on the costa itself. Below and above the fold, near the base, are a few raised ochreous scales, and the first and second bands are also accompanied by some raised scales. The termen is slightly spotted. The hindwings are brownish grey.
