= Chlamydastis melanometra =

Scientific classification
- Kingdom: Animalia
- Phylum: Arthropoda
- Clade: Pancrustacea
- Class: Insecta
- Order: Lepidoptera
- Family: Depressariidae
- Genus: Chlamydastis
- Species: C. melanometra

Binomial name
- Chlamydastis melanometra (Meyrick, 1926)

Synonyms
- Ptilogenes melanometra Meyrick, 1926

Species of moth

Chlamydastis melanometra is a moth of the family Depressariidae. It is found in Colombia.

The wingspan is about 23 mm. The forewings are white, slightly speckled grey and with blackish markings. There is a very short oblique streak from the base of the costa and there are transverse spots on the costa about one-fourth, the middle, and three-fourths, the first rather oblique, pointing to a spot in the disc, another spot in the disc at three-fourths. There are a few undefined dots of grey and blackish scales indicating two irregular sinuate-curved series rising from the second and third costal spots. A pre-marginal series of small spots is found around the apex and termen. The hindwings are whitish-grey.
