= Chlamydastis scutellata =

Scientific classification
- Kingdom: Animalia
- Phylum: Arthropoda
- Clade: Pancrustacea
- Class: Insecta
- Order: Lepidoptera
- Family: Depressariidae
- Genus: Chlamydastis
- Species: C. scutellata

Binomial name
- Chlamydastis scutellata (Meyrick, 1916)

Synonyms
- Agriophara scutellata Meyrick, 1916

Species of moth

Chlamydastis scutellata is a moth of the family Depressariidae. It is found in Costa Rica.

The wingspan is 27–28 mm. The forewings are rather light fuscous, the costal half suffused with dark fuscous, irregularly and suffusedly mixed with dull olive-green, more largely on the dorsal half. There is a dorsal patch of dark fuscous suffusion at one-third. The plical and second discal stigmata are raised, transverse and dark fuscous, edged anteriorly with olive-green. There is an ochreous-whitish blotch partly tinged with brown resting on the upper part of the termen, marked near its anterior edge with a dark brown transverse spot. The hindwings are rather dark grey.
