= Chlamydastis lichenias =

Scientific classification
- Kingdom: Animalia
- Phylum: Arthropoda
- Clade: Pancrustacea
- Class: Insecta
- Order: Lepidoptera
- Family: Depressariidae
- Genus: Chlamydastis
- Species: C. lichenias

Binomial name
- Chlamydastis lichenias (Meyrick, 1916)

Synonyms
- Agriophara lichenias Meyrick, 1916

Species of moth

Chlamydastis lichenias is a moth of the family Depressariidae. It is found in Brazil, Colombia and the Guianas.

The wingspan is 16–17 mm for males and 20–21 mm for females. The forewings are dull grey greenish with black spots on the costa at one-fourth, before the middle, and at two-thirds, giving rise to a rather oblique transverse series of black marks, the first slightly curved, the other two strongly curved in the disc. There is a patch of yellow-ochreous suffusion on the costa between the first two lines, and the plical area is suffusedly mixed with yellow ochreous in the disc. The second discal stigma is white edged posteriorly with black and the third line is partially surrounded with whitish suffusion on the upper half. There is also a patch of black suffusion between the third line and termen below the middle. The hindwings are blackish grey.
