= Chlamydastis acronitis =

Scientific classification
- Kingdom: Animalia
- Phylum: Arthropoda
- Clade: Pancrustacea
- Class: Insecta
- Order: Lepidoptera
- Family: Depressariidae
- Genus: Chlamydastis
- Species: C. acronitis

Binomial name
- Chlamydastis acronitis (Busck, 1911)

Synonyms
- Stenoma acronitis Busck, 1911

Species of moth

Chlamydastis acronitis is a moth in the family Depressariidae. It was described by August Busck in 1911. It is found in French Guiana and Guyana.

The wingspan is 34–40 mm (1.3–1.6 in). The forewings are chalky white, sparsely speckled with brown atoms and with a blackish-brown design. From the basal fourth of the costa runs a blackish-brown streak in over the cell, outwardly, through the end of the cell, toward the middle of the termen, but dividing shortly before the edge into two branches, of which one curves upward to a black, triangular, costal spot at the apical fourth, while the other curves downwards and ends on the dorsal edge before the tornus. The streak is not continuous, but is interrupted and enlarged at its entrance into the cell and at the end of the cell. Between its base and the aforementioned large costal spot is a small black costal dash and around the edge of the wing is a thin black line from the large costal spot to the tornus, on which a series of small black dots is found, one at the terminus of each vein. The hindwings are dark, blackish fuscous.
