= Chlamydastis hemichlora =

Scientific classification
- Kingdom: Animalia
- Phylum: Arthropoda
- Clade: Pancrustacea
- Class: Insecta
- Order: Lepidoptera
- Family: Depressariidae
- Genus: Chlamydastis
- Species: C. hemichlora

Binomial name
- Chlamydastis hemichlora (Meyrick, 1916)

Synonyms
- Agriophara hemichlora Meyrick, 1916

Species of moth

Chlamydastis hemichlora is a moth of the family Depressariidae. It is found in French Guiana.

The wingspan is 26–28 mm for males and about 38 mm for females. The forewings are dark brown, partially suffused with purplish-fuscous, and irregularly marked with dull light green, the dorsal half almost wholly dull light green. The plical and second discal stigmata are raised, transverse-linear and blackish. There is a subterminal line indistinctly indicated by some blackish dots or marks, in females forming strong blackish marks between the veins towards the middle of the termen. The hindwings are dark grey.
