= Chlamydastis illita =

Scientific classification
- Kingdom: Animalia
- Phylum: Arthropoda
- Clade: Pancrustacea
- Class: Insecta
- Order: Lepidoptera
- Family: Depressariidae
- Genus: Chlamydastis
- Species: C. illita

Binomial name
- Chlamydastis illita (Meyrick, 1926)

Synonyms
- Ptilogenes illita Meyrick, 1926

Species of moth

Chlamydastis illita is a moth of the family Depressariidae. It is found in Peru and Colombia.

The wingspan is about 14 mm. The forewings are white with an ochreous-grey patch occupying the basal third, extended as a costal band to three-fourths, a moderately broad suffused median fascia running into this, two undefined transverse shades beyond the cell, and a blotch extending along the termen. The second discal stigma is black and there is a marginal series of blackish dots around the apex and termen. The hindwings are grey.
