= Chlamydastis bifida =

Scientific classification
- Kingdom: Animalia
- Phylum: Arthropoda
- Clade: Pancrustacea
- Class: Insecta
- Order: Lepidoptera
- Family: Depressariidae
- Genus: Chlamydastis
- Species: C. bifida

Binomial name
- Chlamydastis bifida (Meyrick, 1916)

Synonyms
- Agriophara bifida Meyrick, 1916

Species of moth

Chlamydastis bifida is a moth of the family Depressariidae. It is found in Brazil and the Guianas.

The wingspan is about 17 mm. The forewings are pale greyish-ochreous, with a faint greenish tinge, somewhat sprinkled with grey and fuscous, the costal area suffused with fuscous and with a short black oblique streak suffused with dark brown from the base of the costa. There is a black streak along the submedian fold from near the base to the middle, with a tuft of greyish scales on its extremity. A black longitudinal streak is found in the disc from one-third, terminated by a small transverse-oval ochreous-white spot representing the second discal stigma, the discal area around these suffused with grey. Rather large triangular spots of dark purplish-fuscous suffusion are found on the costa at the middle and three-fourths, the second sending a faint curved greyish line to the dorsum before the tornus. A pre-marginal series of dark fuscous dots is found around the apex and termen. The hindwings are grey.
