= Chlamydastis plocogramma =

Scientific classification
- Kingdom: Animalia
- Phylum: Arthropoda
- Clade: Pancrustacea
- Class: Insecta
- Order: Lepidoptera
- Family: Depressariidae
- Genus: Chlamydastis
- Species: C. plocogramma

Binomial name
- Chlamydastis plocogramma (Meyrick, 1915)

Synonyms
- Agriophara plocogramma Meyrick, 1915

Species of moth

Chlamydastis plocogramma is a moth in the family Depressariidae. It was described by Edward Meyrick in 1915. It is found in the Guianas, Colombia and Brazil.

The wingspan is about 15 mm for males and 18 mm for females. The forewings are white, with scattered grey specks and with the markings light yellowish-grey, sprinkled with dark fuscous specks and with an oblique line from the base of the costa, reaching half across the wing. Three cloudy irregular somewhat interrupted lines run from blackish-grey spots on the costa, the first from one-fourth of the costa to two-fifths of the dorsum, curved, the second from before the middle of the costa to two-thirds of the dorsum, forming a broad rectangular loop outwards in the disc, the third from two-thirds of the costa to the dorsum before the tornus, curved outwards on the upper half. There is a small tuft on the fold representing the plical stigma, and a transverse tuft on the end of the cell within the loop of the second line. There is a curved series of small cloudy spots near the apical and terminal margin and a marginal series of lunulate dots around the apex and termen. The hindwings are light grey.
