= Chlamydastis leucoplasta =

Scientific classification
- Kingdom: Animalia
- Phylum: Arthropoda
- Clade: Pancrustacea
- Class: Insecta
- Order: Lepidoptera
- Family: Depressariidae
- Genus: Chlamydastis
- Species: C. leucoplasta

Binomial name
- Chlamydastis leucoplasta (Meyrick, 1926)

Synonyms
- Ptilogenes leucoplasta Meyrick, 1926

Species of moth

Chlamydastis leucoplasta is a moth of the family Depressariidae. It is found in Peru and Brazil.

The wingspan is about 13 mm. The forewings are dark fuscous with a broad white fusiform costal band, almost from the base to the apex. There are two or three indistinct whitish dots on the termen. The hindwings are grey, darker in females.
