= Chlamydastis phasmatopa =

Scientific classification
- Kingdom: Animalia
- Phylum: Arthropoda
- Clade: Pancrustacea
- Class: Insecta
- Order: Lepidoptera
- Family: Depressariidae
- Genus: Chlamydastis
- Species: C. phasmatopa

Binomial name
- Chlamydastis phasmatopa (Meyrick, 1910)

Synonyms
- Stenoma phasmatopa Meyrick, 1910

Species of moth

Chlamydastis phasmatopa is a moth in the family Depressariidae. It was described by Edward Meyrick in 1910. It is found on the Solomon Islands.

The wingspan is 18–20 mm. The forewings are ochreous-white with the markings light fuscous irrorated with dark fuscous. There is a small spot on the base of the costa, and two oblique strigulae on the costa towards the base, as well as an elongate mark on the fold near the base. The plical and first discal stigmata are small, the plical very obliquely beyond the first discal. The second discal is represented by an irregular spot, connected with the middle of the costa by an oblique streak and there is also an oblique strigula from the costa at two-thirds, as well as a curved line near before the termen, sometimes interrupted into three segments. The hindwings are ochreous white.
