= Chlamydastis chionoptila =

Scientific classification
- Kingdom: Animalia
- Phylum: Arthropoda
- Clade: Pancrustacea
- Class: Insecta
- Order: Lepidoptera
- Family: Depressariidae
- Genus: Chlamydastis
- Species: C. chionoptila

Binomial name
- Chlamydastis chionoptila (Meyrick, 1926)

Synonyms
- Ptilogenes chionoptila Meyrick, 1926

Species of moth

Chlamydastis chionoptila is a moth of the family Depressariidae. It is found in Brazil.

It has a wingspan of approximately 19 mm. The forewings are primarily white with fine dark speckles and marked with dark gray that gradually blends into black. Key markings include a strigula near the base of the costa and a small dot below it. There are distinct spots at one-fourth, the middle, and three-fourths along the costa. The first spot is small and sends a curved series of faint gray spots toward the dorsum. The second spot is slightly larger, and the third is moderate in size. Behind the second discal white ridge-tuft, a broad streak runs to the dorsum before the tornus, merging with a curved shade from the third costal spot. Additional features include a curved, interrupted subterminal shade and a series of marginal dots near the apex and termen. The hindwings are gray.
