= Chlamydastis chlorosticta =

Scientific classification
- Kingdom: Animalia
- Phylum: Arthropoda
- Clade: Pancrustacea
- Class: Insecta
- Order: Lepidoptera
- Family: Depressariidae
- Genus: Chlamydastis
- Species: C. chlorosticta

Binomial name
- Chlamydastis chlorosticta (Meyrick, 1913)

Synonyms
- Agriophara chlorosticta Meyrick, 1913

Species of moth

Chlamydastis chlorosticta is a moth in the family Depressariidae. It was described by Edward Meyrick in 1913. It is found in Peru, the Guianas and Brazil.

The wingspan is about 30 mm. The forewings are ashy-fuscous, longitudinally streaked with darker fuscous, these streaks running into the costa anteriorly. There is a short fine greenish dash towards the costa at one-third and two small greenish spots obliquely placed towards the dorsum before the middle. A submarginal row of greenish dots runs near and parallel to the posterior half of the costa and termen and there is a row of small brown marginal spots around the apex and termen. The hindwings are dark fuscous.
