= Chlamydastis complexa =

Scientific classification
- Kingdom: Animalia
- Phylum: Arthropoda
- Clade: Pancrustacea
- Class: Insecta
- Order: Lepidoptera
- Family: Depressariidae
- Genus: Chlamydastis
- Species: C. complexa

Binomial name
- Chlamydastis complexa (Meyrick, 1916)

Synonyms
- Agriophara complexa Meyrick, 1916

Species of moth

Chlamydastis complexa is a moth of the family Depressariidae. It is found in French Guiana.

The wingspan is 24–26 mm. The forewings are white, faintly greenish-tinged, irregularly irrorated with grey and dark fuscous and with a cloudy dark grey line from one-fourth of the costa to two-fifths of the dorsum, obtusely angulated below the middle. There is a transverse-linear dark fuscous mark on the end of the cell and a small dark fuscous spot on the middle of the costa, where a series of small indistinct dark fuscous marks runs obliquely outwards to beyond the cell, then angulated to three-fourths of the dorsum, and a curved dark fuscous line from a spot on the costa at three-fourths to the dorsum before the tornus, the dorsal space between these forming a dark grey blackish-edged blotch reaching to near the middle. An irregular blotch of dark fuscous suffusion extends over the apex and upper half of the termen. The hindwings are dark grey, paler towards the dorsum.
