= Chlamydastis leucoptila =

Scientific classification
- Kingdom: Animalia
- Phylum: Arthropoda
- Clade: Pancrustacea
- Class: Insecta
- Order: Lepidoptera
- Family: Depressariidae
- Genus: Chlamydastis
- Species: C. leucoptila

Binomial name
- Chlamydastis leucoptila (Meyrick, 1918)

Synonyms
- Ptilogenes leucoptila Meyrick, 1918; Stenoma laetifica Busck, 1920

Species of moth

Chlamydastis leucoptila is a moth in the family Depressariidae. It was described by Edward Meyrick in 1918. It is found in French Guiana and Guatemala.

The wingspan is about 21 mm. The forewings are pale brown, faintly rosy-tinged, with a few scattered black specks and small grey spots on the costa at one-fourth, before the middle, and at three-fifths, from the third a strongly curved faint grey line marked with several black dots runs to the dorsum before the tornus. The stigmata are represented by white tufts, the plical obliquely beyond the first discal and a grey blotch extending on the dorsum from one-fourth to four-fifths and reaching to the fold, mixed blackish anteriorly. A blackish spot adjoining the posterior line is found just below the middle, beneath this a spot of whitish suffusion edged posteriorly by a black dot, and some whitish suffusion above the tornus. The hindwings are dark grey.
