= Chlamydastis deflexa =

Scientific classification
- Kingdom: Animalia
- Phylum: Arthropoda
- Clade: Pancrustacea
- Class: Insecta
- Order: Lepidoptera
- Family: Depressariidae
- Genus: Chlamydastis
- Species: C. deflexa

Binomial name
- Chlamydastis deflexa (Meyrick, 1916)

Synonyms
- Agriophara deflexa Meyrick, 1916

Species of insect

Chlamydastis deflexa is a moth of the family Depressariidae. It is found in Brazil and the Guianas.

The wingspan is 15–16 mm. The forewings are white sprinkled with fuscous and with the basal fourth suffused with fuscous. There is a broad suffused fuscous terminal band, its edge running from the angle of the costa to the middle of the dorsum. The plical stigma forms a black dot on the edge of this band, the second discal a somewhat oblique blackish transverse mark within the margin of band, extended downwards by some brown suffusion. There is some dark fuscous suffusion or irroration between the veins towards the apical part of the costa. The hindwings are dark grey.
