= Chlamydastis forcipata =

Scientific classification
- Kingdom: Animalia
- Phylum: Arthropoda
- Clade: Pancrustacea
- Class: Insecta
- Order: Lepidoptera
- Family: Depressariidae
- Genus: Chlamydastis
- Species: C. forcipata

Binomial name
- Chlamydastis forcipata (Meyrick, 1913)

Synonyms
- Agriophara forcipata Meyrick, 1913

Species of moth

Chlamydastis forcipata is a moth in the family Depressariidae. It was described by Edward Meyrick in 1913. It is found in Colombia.

The wingspan is about 23 mm. The forewings are white, sprinkled with brown and a few black scales and with brown costal spots at one-fifth and two-fifths, and a larger one at three-fourths. A small subcostal tuft of black and brown scales is found beyond the first of these and there is a brown median longitudinal streak from the base to the end of the cell, where it expands into a brown cloud surrounding posteriorly the blackish white-centred second discal stigma, the first discal stigma black, placed on the upper edge of this streak. There is a rather irregular series of indistinct blackish dots suffused with brown from the third costal spot to before the tornus, and a row of more distinct blackish dots near the termen. The hindwings are ochreous-whitish.
