= Chlamydastis tritypa =

Scientific classification
- Kingdom: Animalia
- Phylum: Arthropoda
- Clade: Pancrustacea
- Class: Insecta
- Order: Lepidoptera
- Family: Depressariidae
- Genus: Chlamydastis
- Species: C. tritypa

Binomial name
- Chlamydastis tritypa (Meyrick, 1909)

Synonyms
- Stenoma tritypa Meyrick, 1909

Species of moth

Chlamydastis tritypa is a moth in the family Depressariidae. It was described by Edward Meyrick in 1909. It is found in Peru.

The wingspan is 25–28 mm. The forewings are ochreous-whitish with the basal area tinged with olive-greenish and with three blackish costal spots, the first at one-fifth, small, the second before the middle, moderate and subtriangular, the third at two-thirds, larger and transverse. There is more or less indistinct pale olive-greenish clouding in the disc before the middle, and towards the middle of the dorsum, as well as an outwards-curved olive-greenish streak from the second costal spot to the tornus, the upper portion broken into spots. A greenish-fuscous transverse discal mark is found near before this, preceded by a tuft of raised scales. There is also an oblique olive-greenish line from the third costal spot reaching half across the wing and a series of subconfluent small greenish-fuscous spots near before the termen, as well as a terminal series of rather dark fuscous lunulate marks. The hindwings are grey.
