= Chlamydastis phytoptera =

Scientific classification
- Kingdom: Animalia
- Phylum: Arthropoda
- Clade: Pancrustacea
- Class: Insecta
- Order: Lepidoptera
- Family: Depressariidae
- Genus: Chlamydastis
- Species: C. phytoptera

Binomial name
- Chlamydastis phytoptera (Busck, 1914)

Synonyms
- Stenoma phytoptera Busck, 1914

Species of moth

Chlamydastis phytoptera is a moth in the family Depressariidae. It was described by August Busck in 1914. It is found in Panama and Costa Rica.

The wingspan is 25–27 mm. The forewings are dark violaceous brown, irregularly mottled with leaf-green scales, a large blotch of which is found just before the middle of the dorsum, followed by a black dot on the fold. At the end of the cell is a short, transverse, black line and on the middle of the edge is a large showy dark velvety brown spot with a pure white center and with deep black shadings in front, and with four or five black dashes toward the margin. The hindwings are blackish fuscous.
