= Chlamydastis paradromis =

Scientific classification
- Kingdom: Animalia
- Phylum: Arthropoda
- Clade: Pancrustacea
- Class: Insecta
- Order: Lepidoptera
- Family: Depressariidae
- Genus: Chlamydastis
- Species: C. paradromis

Binomial name
- Chlamydastis paradromis (Meyrick, 1915)

Synonyms
- Agriophara paradromis Meyrick, 1915

Species of moth

Chlamydastis paradromis is a moth in the family Depressariidae. It was described by Edward Meyrick in 1915. It is found in Colombia.

The wingspan is 27–29 mm. The forewings are white, speckled with grey and with a short oblique blackish mark from the base of the costa and an oblique series of three blackish marks from the costa at one-fifth, the third representing the first discal stigma. There are blackish spots on the costa before the middle and at two-thirds, the first giving rise to a very oblique series of three small blackish marks connected with an irregular cloudy dark fuscous line passing behind the cell and becoming obsolete near the dorsum, the second to a curved cloudy fuscous line becoming much thicker and darker on the dorsal half and running to the dorsum before the tornus. There is a white tuft representing the plical stigma, edged with dark fuscous above and there is also a transverse white tuft on the end of the cell, partially edged with dark fuscous behind and beneath. A curved submarginal series of cloudy fuscous or dark fuscous spots is found around the apex and termen, thickened and subconfluent opposite the middle of the termen and there is a marginal series of lunulate fuscous marks around the apex and termen. The hindwings are grey, paler towards the base.
