= Chlamydastis epophrysta =

Scientific classification
- Kingdom: Animalia
- Phylum: Arthropoda
- Clade: Pancrustacea
- Class: Insecta
- Order: Lepidoptera
- Family: Depressariidae
- Genus: Chlamydastis
- Species: C. epophrysta

Binomial name
- Chlamydastis epophrysta (Meyrick, 1909)

Synonyms
- Stenoma epophrysta Meyrick, 1909

Species of moth

Chlamydastis epophrysta is a moth in the family Depressariidae. It was described by Edward Meyrick in 1909. It is found in Peru.

The wingspan is about 23 mm. The forewings are whitish-ochreous suffused with pale brownish-ochreous and with a dark fuscous spot on the costa at one-fourth, from where proceeds an irregular-dentate fuscous line to two-fifths of the dorsum, preceded in the disc by raised scales. There is a large dark brown transverse blotch resting on the middle of the costa and reaching to near the dorsum before the tornus, connected by a brown cloud in the disc with the preceding line. A curved-angulated transverse series of dark fuscous dots is found parallel to the posterior edge of this, forming a dark fuscous spot on the costa, and followed by a brown shade enlarged on the lower half into a rounded dark brown tornal blotch. There is also a terminal series of dark fuscous marks. The hindwings are dark fuscous.
