= Gymnomma novum =

Scientific classification
- Kingdom: Animalia
- Phylum: Arthropoda
- Clade: Pancrustacea
- Class: Insecta
- Order: Diptera
- Family: Tachinidae
- Genus: Gymnomma
- Species: G. novum

Binomial name
- Gymnomma novum Giglio-Tos, 1893

Species of fly

Gymnomma novum is a species of tachinid flies in the genus Gymnomma of the family Tachinidae.
