= Chlamydastis monastra =

Scientific classification
- Kingdom: Animalia
- Phylum: Arthropoda
- Clade: Pancrustacea
- Class: Insecta
- Order: Lepidoptera
- Family: Depressariidae
- Genus: Chlamydastis
- Species: C. monastra

Binomial name
- Chlamydastis monastra (Meyrick, 1909)

Synonyms
- Stenoma monastra Meyrick, 1909

Species of moth

Chlamydastis monastra is a moth in the family Depressariidae. It was described by Edward Meyrick in 1909. It is found in Peru.

The wingspan is about 28 mm. The forewings are fuscous suffused with brown, especially towards the middle of the disc and three indistinct darker fuscous transverse series of cloudy dots starting from small distinct spots on the costa, the first curved outwards above the fold and inwards below it, preceded by pale raised scales in the disc, the second at first very oblique outwards, strongly curved in the disc, obsolete towards the dorsum, the third curved outwards on the upper half, forming a straight shade on the lower half. A clear round white discal dot is found at three-fifths, partially edged with dark fuscous, and connected with the first line by a longitudinal suffused dark fuscous bar. There is also a very undefined sinuate subterminal line indicated by slight whitish suffusion and edged posteriorly with darker suffusion, as well as some slight whitish suffusion towards the apex and a terminal series of dark fuscous marks. The hindwings are dark fuscous.
