= Chlamydastis caecata =

Scientific classification
- Kingdom: Animalia
- Phylum: Arthropoda
- Clade: Pancrustacea
- Class: Insecta
- Order: Lepidoptera
- Family: Depressariidae
- Genus: Chlamydastis
- Species: C. caecata

Binomial name
- Chlamydastis caecata (Meyrick, 1916)

Synonyms
- Agriophara caecata Meyrick, 1916

Species of moth

Chlamydastis caecata is a moth of the family Depressariidae. It is found in French Guiana.

The wingspan is about 24 mm. The forewings are violet-fuscous with several small light dull greenish spots traversing the wing before the middle, one representing the plical stigma is larger. There is a dark violet-fuscous triangular apical patch, its edge running from beyond the middle of the costa to the tornus, slightly convex, marked towards the termen in the middle with a round blackish blotch resting on its anterior edge, suffused posteriorly but finely whitish-edged anteriorly. The hindwings are dark fuscous.
