= Chlamydastis obnupta =

Scientific classification
- Kingdom: Animalia
- Phylum: Arthropoda
- Clade: Pancrustacea
- Class: Insecta
- Order: Lepidoptera
- Family: Depressariidae
- Genus: Chlamydastis
- Species: C. obnupta

Binomial name
- Chlamydastis obnupta (Meyrick, 1916)

Synonyms
- Agriophara obnupta Meyrick, 1916

Species of moth

Chlamydastis obnupta is a moth of the family Depressariidae. It is found in French Guiana.

The wingspan is 21 mm for males and 24 mm for females. The forewings are white, irregularly sprinkled in the disc and suffusedly mixed with greenish-grey. There are reddish-brown blotches on the costa at the base and one-third reaching half across the wing, partially suffused together. There are also three blackish marks on the costa from one-fourth to the middle. The stigmata are small, raised and blackish, the plical rather obliquely beyond the first discal. These are followed by some dark grey suffusion confluent with the second blotch, the second discal transverse. There is a reddish-brown streak along the costa from three-fifths, enlarged into a blotch towards the apex, its costal edge interruptedly dark fuscous. An irregular transverse dark grey mark is found before the middle of the termen, and there is also an interrupted dark fuscous terminal line. The hindwings are light grey.
