= Chlamydastis lactis =

Scientific classification
- Kingdom: Animalia
- Phylum: Arthropoda
- Clade: Pancrustacea
- Class: Insecta
- Order: Lepidoptera
- Family: Depressariidae
- Genus: Chlamydastis
- Species: C. lactis

Binomial name
- Chlamydastis lactis (Busck, 1911)

Synonyms
- Stenoma lactis Busck, 1911

Species of moth

Chlamydastis lactis is a moth in the family Depressariidae. It was described by August Busck in 1911. It is found in the Guianas and Brazil.

The wingspan is 19–21 mm. The basal third of the forewings is ocherous white, and the terminal two-thirds dark fuscous, the limits of the two colors sharply drawn by a slightly outwardly curved pure white line from the basal fourth of the costa to shortly before the middle of the dorsum. In the dark part of the wing are several small scale tufts mixed with black scales and at the end of the cell is a small ocherous tuft followed by black. The hindwings are triangular, dark fuscous.
