= Chlamydastis ancalota =

Scientific classification
- Kingdom: Animalia
- Phylum: Arthropoda
- Clade: Pancrustacea
- Class: Insecta
- Order: Lepidoptera
- Family: Depressariidae
- Genus: Chlamydastis
- Species: C. ancalota

Binomial name
- Chlamydastis ancalota (Meyrick, 1916)

Synonyms
- Agriophara ancalota Meyrick, 1916

Species of moth

Chlamydastis ancalota is a moth of the family Depressariidae. It is found in French Guiana.

The wingspan is 19 mm for males and 23 mm for females. The forewings are light moss-green. The stigmata are represented by small tufts, the plical rather beyond the first discal. There are very small dark fuscous spots on the costa at one-fourth and three-fourths, as well as a thick dark brown streak from the middle of the costa to the termen below the middle, mixed with black except towards the costa, somewhat bent downwards in the disc and interrupted just beyond the bend. The hindwings are dark grey.
