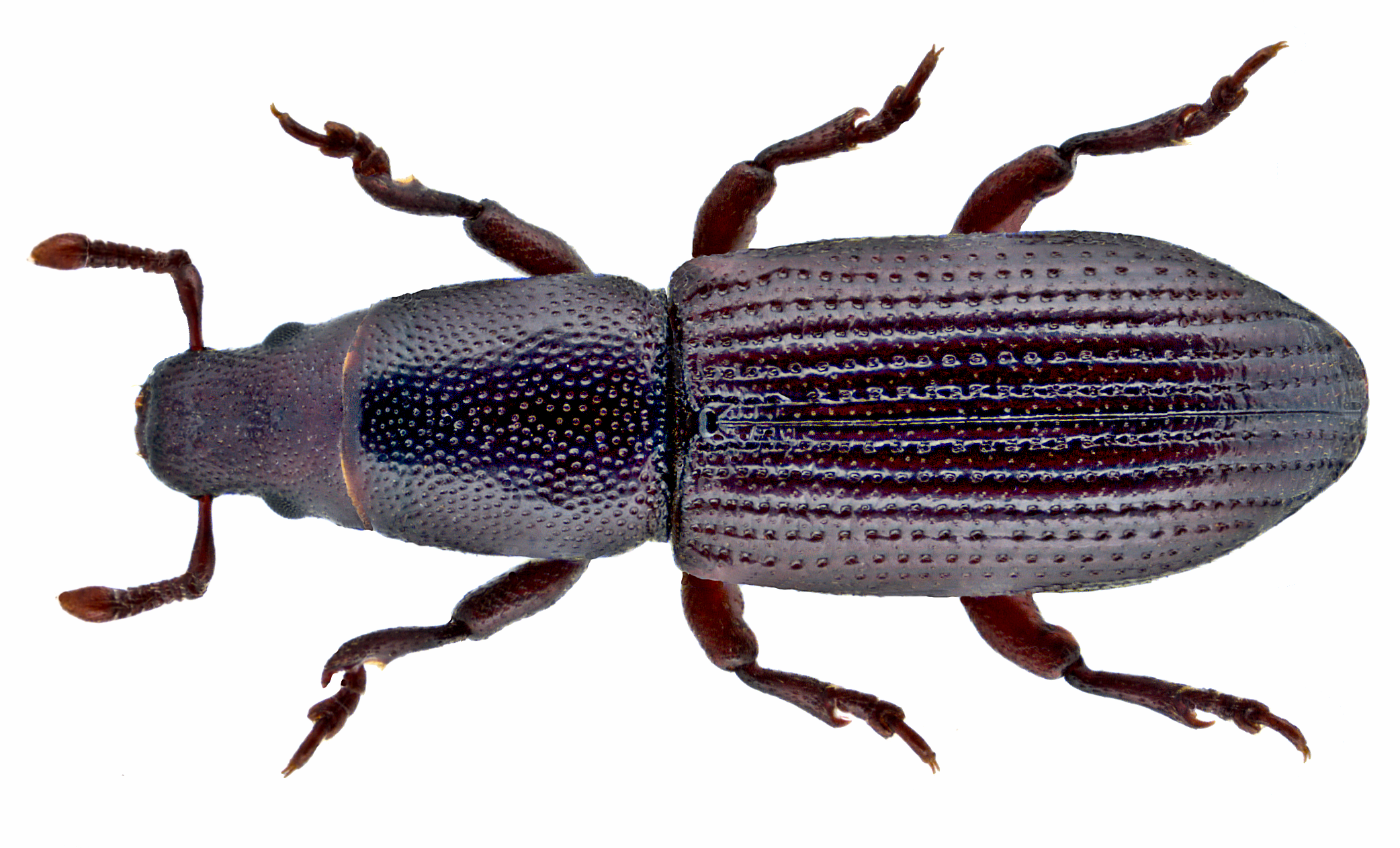

Scientific classification
- Kingdom: Animalia
- Phylum: Arthropoda
- Clade: Pancrustacea
- Class: Insecta
- Order: Coleoptera
- Suborder: Polyphaga
- Infraorder: Cucujiformia
- Superfamily: Curculionoidea
- Family: Curculionidae
- Genus: Rhyncolus
- Species: R. ater

Binomial name
- Rhyncolus ater (Linnaeus, 1758)

Synonyms
- Rhyncolus chloropus Linnaeus, 1758

= Rhyncolus ater =

Species of beetle

Rhyncolus ater is a species of weevil found in Europe and Asia.

== Description ==
The average length of the species is about 3.0 to 4.5 mm.

Larval development occur in rotten wood. It is also known to attack industrial wood.
