= Chlamydastis dominicae =

Scientific classification
- Kingdom: Animalia
- Phylum: Arthropoda
- Clade: Pancrustacea
- Class: Insecta
- Order: Lepidoptera
- Family: Depressariidae
- Genus: Chlamydastis
- Species: C. dominicae

Binomial name
- Chlamydastis dominicae Duckworth, 1969

Species of moth

Chlamydastis dominicae is a moth of the family Depressariidae. It is found on Dominica.

The wingspan is 23–25 mm. The forewings are white variously mottled with brown, black and brownish orange and there are two outwardly oblique transverse indistinct black lines from the costa before the middle but failing to reach the dorsum. There is an irregular outwardly oblique blotch of brownish orange from the costa at the middle extending to the area just above the tornus. There are two parallel indistinct subterminal orange lines from the apical third, terminating in two black dashes at the tornus. The terminal line consisting of black dots from well before the apex to the tornus. The hindwings are heavily overcast with grey.
