= Chlamydastis nestes =

Scientific classification
- Kingdom: Animalia
- Phylum: Arthropoda
- Clade: Pancrustacea
- Class: Insecta
- Order: Lepidoptera
- Family: Depressariidae
- Genus: Chlamydastis
- Species: C. nestes

Binomial name
- Chlamydastis nestes (Busck, 1911)

Synonyms
- Stenoma nestes Busck, 1911

Species of moth

Chlamydastis nestes is a moth in the family Depressariidae. It was described by August Busck in 1911. It is found in French Guiana.

The wingspan is 25–28 mm. The forewings are reddish white, strongly suffused with brown scales and with three blackish brown equidistant costal spots, the basal one the smallest, the outer most prominent, large triangular. There is a short deep black transverse dash at the end of the cell, preceded by a pure white spot, before which a thin longitudinal deep black line runs across the cell to the base of vein 11. There is also a large ill-defined cloud of dark brown scales above the tornus. The hindwings are dark brown.
