= Chlamydastis batrachopis =

Scientific classification
- Kingdom: Animalia
- Phylum: Arthropoda
- Clade: Pancrustacea
- Class: Insecta
- Order: Lepidoptera
- Family: Depressariidae
- Genus: Chlamydastis
- Species: C. batrachopis

Binomial name
- Chlamydastis batrachopis (Meyrick, 1913)

Synonyms
- Agriophara batrachopis Meyrick, 1913

Species of moth

Chlamydastis batrachopis is a moth in the family Depressariidae. It was described by Edward Meyrick in 1913. It is found in Peru.

The wingspan is about 34 mm. The forewings are pale dull olive-ochreous mixed with whitish and with four dull olive-ochreous fasciae mixed with fuscous, appearing greenish-tinged, the first at one-fourth, slender, irregular, the second reduced to the costal, discal, and submedian spots, the third from three-fourths of the costa to before the tornus, very narrow between a costal blotch and the middle, the fourth terminal on the lower half and forming four pre-terminal spots on the upper half. The second discal stigma forms an oblique black transverse mark and there is a transverse tuft of scales in the disc near before this, and another on the fold before the middle. The hindwings are dark grey.
