= Chlamydastis poliopa =

Scientific classification
- Kingdom: Animalia
- Phylum: Arthropoda
- Clade: Pancrustacea
- Class: Insecta
- Order: Lepidoptera
- Family: Depressariidae
- Genus: Chlamydastis
- Species: C. poliopa

Binomial name
- Chlamydastis poliopa (Meyrick, 1916)

Synonyms
- Agriophara poliopa Meyrick, 1916

Species of moth

Chlamydastis poliopa is a moth of the family Depressariidae. It is found in Colombia.

The wingspan is 22–23 mm. The forewings are whitish and sprinkled with fuscous, with black dots on the base of the costa, and towards the base in the middle. There is a straight oblique series of four black dots from the costa at one-fourth, the two lower forming the first discal and plical stigmata, the plical edged anteriorly by a white tuft. The second discal stigma is raised, white and edged with dark fuscous. There are small blackish spots on the costa before the middle and at two-thirds, giving rise to two transverse series of cloudy blackish dots, strongly bent in the disc and sinuate inwards below this, the second running to the tornus. A submarginal row of small blackish spots is found around the posterior part of the costa and termen. The hindwings are grey.
