= Chlamydastis byssophanes =

Scientific classification
- Kingdom: Animalia
- Phylum: Arthropoda
- Clade: Pancrustacea
- Class: Insecta
- Order: Lepidoptera
- Family: Depressariidae
- Genus: Chlamydastis
- Species: C. byssophanes

Binomial name
- Chlamydastis byssophanes (Meyrick, 1926)

Synonyms
- Ptilogenes byssophanes Meyrick, 1926

Species of moth

Chlamydastis byssophanes is a moth of the family Depressariidae. It is found in Peru and Brazil.

The wingspan is 16–21 mm. The forewings are dark fuscous, irregularly and variably suffused purplish with violet-whitish specks, the terminal third except towards the costa and dorsum chestnut-brown. The discal stigmata are large, cloudy and darker and sometimes with an irregular white tornal blotch. The terminal edge is white, becoming dots towards the tornus. The hindwings are dark grey.
