= Chlamydastis chionosphena =

Scientific classification
- Kingdom: Animalia
- Phylum: Arthropoda
- Clade: Pancrustacea
- Class: Insecta
- Order: Lepidoptera
- Family: Depressariidae
- Genus: Chlamydastis
- Species: C. chionosphena

Binomial name
- Chlamydastis chionosphena (Meyrick, 1931)

Synonyms
- Ptilogenes chionosphena Meyrick, 1931

Species of moth

Chlamydastis chionosphena is a moth in the family Depressariidae. It was described by Edward Meyrick in 1931. It is found in French Guiana.
