= Chlamydastis mysticopis =

Scientific classification
- Kingdom: Animalia
- Phylum: Arthropoda
- Clade: Pancrustacea
- Class: Insecta
- Order: Lepidoptera
- Family: Depressariidae
- Genus: Chlamydastis
- Species: C. mysticopis

Binomial name
- Chlamydastis mysticopis (Meyrick, 1926)

Synonyms
- Ptilogenes mysticopis Meyrick, 1926

Species of moth

Chlamydastis mysticopis is a moth of the family Depressariidae. It is found in Peru.

The wingspan is 20–21 mm. The forewings are pale greyish, thinly sprinkled dark fuscous, the dorsal third suffused whitish. There is a broad white fusiform costal band from near the base to near the apex, edged below with slight irregular dark fuscous suffusion. The hindwings are pale greyish-ochreous.
