= Chlamydastis stagnicolor =

Scientific classification
- Kingdom: Animalia
- Phylum: Arthropoda
- Clade: Pancrustacea
- Class: Insecta
- Order: Lepidoptera
- Family: Depressariidae
- Genus: Chlamydastis
- Species: C. stagnicolor

Binomial name
- Chlamydastis stagnicolor (Meyrick, 1926)

Synonyms
- Ptilogenes stagnicolor Meyrick, 1926

Species of moth

Chlamydastis stagnicolor is a moth of the family Depressariidae. It is found in Brazil.

The wingspan is 18–19 mm. The forewings are grey-whitish, with a faint greenish tinge and small dark grey spots on the costa at one-fourth, the middle, and three-fourths, as well as faint irregular curved lines from each, hardly perceptibly indicated by grey suffusion, the upper half of the second rather strongly outwards-oblique and marked with three or four indistinct darker dots. There is a faint subterminal line also indicated and there is a marginal series of grey dots around the apex and termen. The hindwings are rather dark grey.
