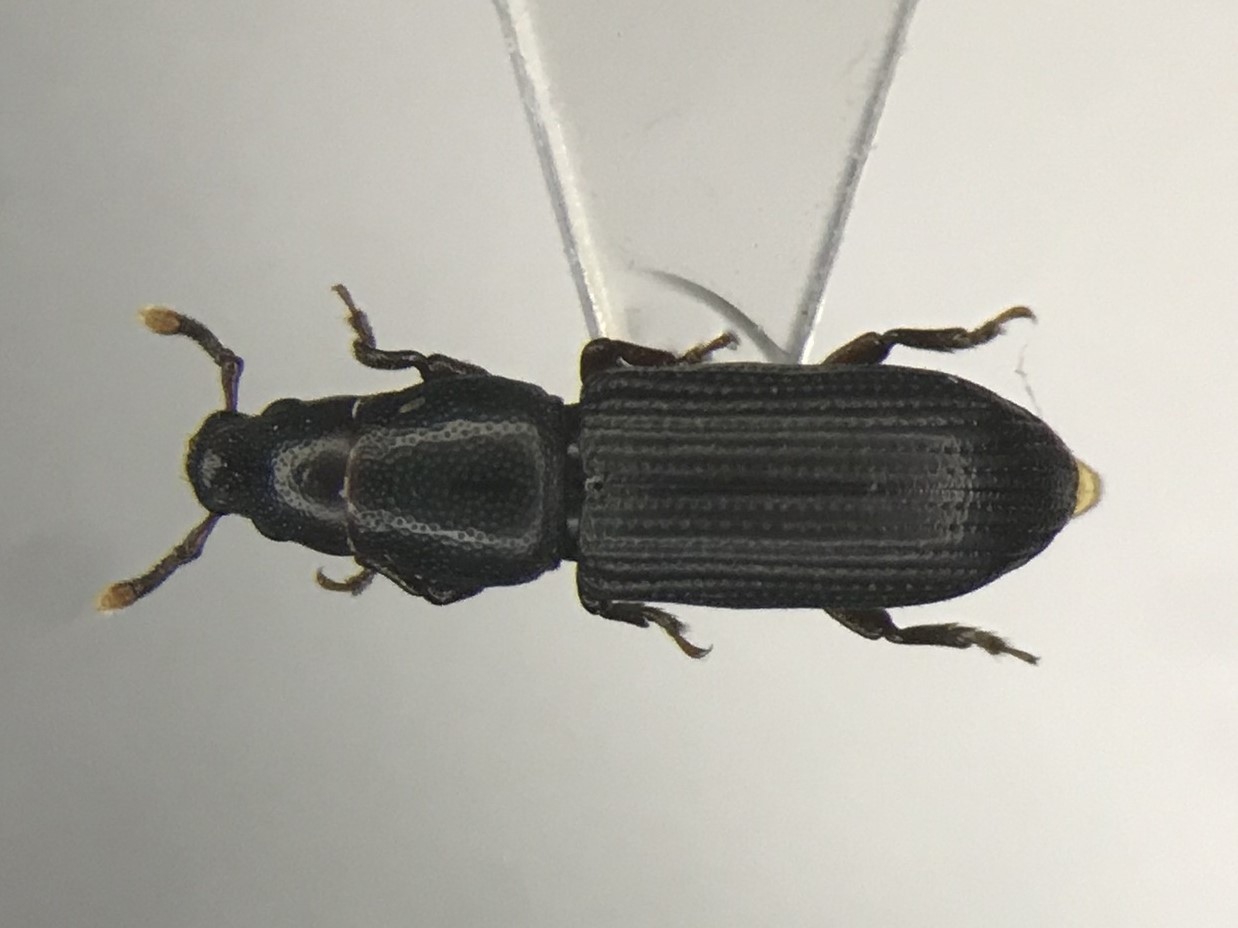

Scientific classification
- Kingdom: Animalia
- Phylum: Arthropoda
- Clade: Pancrustacea
- Class: Insecta
- Order: Coleoptera
- Suborder: Polyphaga
- Infraorder: Cucujiformia
- Superfamily: Curculionoidea
- Family: Curculionidae
- Genus: Rhyncolus
- Species: R. macrops

Binomial name
- Rhyncolus macrops Buchanan, 1946

= Rhyncolus macrops =

Species of beetle

Rhyncolus macrops is a species of true weevil in the beetle family Curculionidae. It is found in North America.
