= Chlamydastis deflua =

Scientific classification
- Kingdom: Animalia
- Phylum: Arthropoda
- Clade: Pancrustacea
- Class: Insecta
- Order: Lepidoptera
- Family: Depressariidae
- Genus: Chlamydastis
- Species: C. deflua

Binomial name
- Chlamydastis deflua (Meyrick, 1918)

Synonyms
- Ptilogenes deflua Meyrick, 1918

Species of moth

Chlamydastis deflua is a moth in the family Depressariidae. It was described by Edward Meyrick in 1918. It is found in the Guianas and Brazil.

The wingspan is 16–18 mm. The forewings are white sprinkled grey and with the markings formed of light ochreous-grey suffusion irrorated dark grey and with a spot on the base of the costa. Three irregular indistinct oblique transverse lines rise from small blackish spots on the costa, preceded by series of raised tufts white anteriorly, the first nearly straight, the second rather curved in the disc, marked with several blackish dots, the third rather strongly excurved on the median third. Two blackish dots are transversely placed on the end of the cell within the second line, and a small very oblique blackish mark preceding the lower of these. A similar irregular line near and parallel to the termen, enlarged into a spot below the middle. There is a terminal row of dots. The hindwings are grey.
