= Chlamydastis smodicopa =

Scientific classification
- Kingdom: Animalia
- Phylum: Arthropoda
- Clade: Pancrustacea
- Class: Insecta
- Order: Lepidoptera
- Family: Depressariidae
- Genus: Chlamydastis
- Species: C. smodicopa

Binomial name
- Chlamydastis smodicopa (Meyrick, 1915)

Synonyms
- Agriophara smodicopa Meyrick, 1915

Species of moth

Chlamydastis smodicopa is a moth in the family Depressariidae. It was described by Edward Meyrick in 1915. It is found in Brazil and Peru.

The wingspan is about 30 mm. The forewings are whitish, sprinkled with light fuscous and with a small fuscous spot on the base of the costa and brownish spots becoming dark fuscous on the costa at one-fourth and before the middle, and a larger one at two-thirds, where a brownish line, fine and dentate on the upper half, then thick and straight, runs to the tornus. A fuscous spot mixed with blackish above is found on the dorsum at two-fifths and there is a small white tuft edged posteriorly with fuscous in the disc at one-third, a larger one on the fold obliquely beyond this, one in the disc beyond the middle, and two small ones edged posteriorly with some dark fuscous scales beneath this. There is also a slightly oblique strong black transverse mark in the disc at two-thirds. Three cloudy light brownish spots are found before the upper part of the termen and there is a blotch before the lower, as well as a terminal series of fuscous triangular dots. The hindwings are light grey.
