= Chlamydastis funicularis =

Scientific classification
- Kingdom: Animalia
- Phylum: Arthropoda
- Clade: Pancrustacea
- Class: Insecta
- Order: Lepidoptera
- Family: Depressariidae
- Genus: Chlamydastis
- Species: C. funicularis

Binomial name
- Chlamydastis funicularis (Meyrick, 1926)

Synonyms
- Ptilogenes funicularis Meyrick, 1926

Species of moth

Chlamydastis funicularis is a moth of the family Depressariidae. It is found in French Guiana.

The wingspan is about 23 mm. The forewings are light brownish, sprinkled violet-fuscous and dark fuscous, especially on the edges of the veins. The costal edge is white with about ten small elongate dark fuscous spots or marks and there is some irregular dark streaking in the cell, and an indistinct irregular dentate rather oblique dark fuscous line at about one-third, as well as a terminal series of dark fuscous marks preceded by whitish suffusion between the veins. The hindwings are rather dark grey, the apical edge whitish.
