= Chlamydastis orion =

Scientific classification
- Kingdom: Animalia
- Phylum: Arthropoda
- Clade: Pancrustacea
- Class: Insecta
- Order: Lepidoptera
- Family: Depressariidae
- Genus: Chlamydastis
- Species: C. orion

Binomial name
- Chlamydastis orion (Busck, 1920)

Synonyms
- Stenoma orion Busck, 1920; Ptilogenes rufispinis Meyrick, 1932

Species of moth

Chlamydastis orion is a moth in the family Depressariidae. It was described by August Busck in 1920. It is found in Guatemala and Colombia.
