= Chlamydastis ptilopa =

Scientific classification
- Kingdom: Animalia
- Phylum: Arthropoda
- Clade: Pancrustacea
- Class: Insecta
- Order: Lepidoptera
- Family: Depressariidae
- Genus: Chlamydastis
- Species: C. ptilopa

Binomial name
- Chlamydastis ptilopa (Meyrick, 1913)

Synonyms
- Agriophara ptilopa Meyrick, 1913

Species of moth

Chlamydastis ptilopa is a moth in the family Depressariidae. It was described by Edward Meyrick in 1913. It is found in Colombia.

The wingspan is 22–26 mm. The forewings are pale fuscous sprinkled with dark fuscous and a short oblique dark fuscous line from the base of the costa and there are four transverse series of blackish-fuscous dots sometimes connected by fuscous suffusion, angulated in the disc, the fourth very near the apical portion of the costa and termen. The plical and second discal stigmata are raised and whitish, edged with dark fuscous, forming the angles of the first and second series respectively. The fourth series is sometimes preceded and followed by a series of suffused whitish spots. The hindwings are dark fuscous.
