= Parepalpus =

Scientific classification
- Kingdom: Animalia
- Phylum: Arthropoda
- Clade: Pancrustacea
- Class: Insecta
- Order: Diptera
- Family: Tachinidae
- Subfamily: Tachininae
- Tribe: Tachinini
- Genus: Parepalpus; Coquillett, 1902

Type species
- Parepalpus flavida Coquillett, 1902

Synonyms
- Oxapampoelpalpus Guimarães, 1971; Oxapampoepalpus Townsend, 1931

Genus of flies

Parepalpus is a genus of flies in the family Tachinidae.

== Species ==
- Parepalpus auroanalis (Townsend, 1931)
- Parepalpus constans (Walker, 1849)
- Parepalpus discors (Wulp, 1882)
- Parepalpus flavidus Coquillett, 1902
- Parepalpus labeosus Reinhard, 1957
- Parepalpus similis Townsend, 1914
