= Amara discors =

Scientific classification
- Kingdom: Animalia
- Phylum: Arthropoda
- Class: Insecta
- Order: Coleoptera
- Suborder: Adephaga
- Family: Carabidae
- Tribe: Zabrini
- Subtribe: Amarina
- Genus: Amara
- Species: A. discors

Binomial name
- Amara discors Kirby, 1837

Synonyms
- Amara scolopax (Casey, 1924); Amara spaldingi (Casey, 1918); Amara wakelandi Hatch, 1949; Bradytus spaldingi Casey, 1924; Celia nevadica Casey, 1918; Celia parowana Casey, 1924; Celia scolopax Casey, 1918

Species of beetle

Amara discors is a species of seed-eating ground beetle in the family Carabidae. It is found in North America.
