= Chlamydastis discors =

Scientific classification
- Kingdom: Animalia
- Phylum: Arthropoda
- Clade: Pancrustacea
- Class: Insecta
- Order: Lepidoptera
- Family: Depressariidae
- Genus: Chlamydastis
- Species: C. discors

Binomial name
- Chlamydastis discors (Meyrick, 1913)

Synonyms
- Agriophara discors Meyrick, 1913

Species of moth

Chlamydastis discors is a moth in the family Depressariidae. It was described by Edward Meyrick in 1913. It is found in Peru.

The wingspan is about 23 mm. The forewings are lilac-fuscous, mixed with brown, with some scattered blackish scales and several tufts of scales on or near the fold anteriorly, as well as two oblique obtusely angulated series of brown tufts crossing the wing from before the middle of the costa to three-fourths of the dorsum, the first including in the disc a small blackish-mixed spot partially outlined with whitish. Beyond these, the terminal third of the wing is wholly ochreous-white, crossed by a strongly sinuate line of grey dots from a small spot on the costa to the tornus, a cloudy grey dentate line near the termen, and a series of minute indistinct blackish dots suffused with ferruginous-ochreous just before the termen. The hindwings are grey, the apical margin suffused with whitish.
