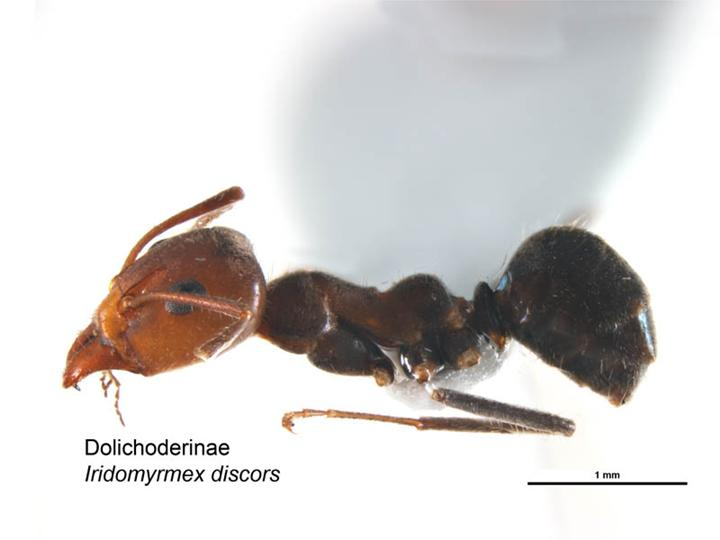

Scientific classification
- Kingdom: Animalia
- Phylum: Arthropoda
- Class: Insecta
- Order: Hymenoptera
- Family: Formicidae
- Subfamily: Dolichoderinae
- Genus: Iridomyrmex
- Species: I. discors

Binomial name
- Iridomyrmex discors Forel, 1902

Synonyms
- Iridomyrmex discors aeneogaster Wheeler, W.M., 1915; Iridomyrmex discors occipitalis Forel, 1907

= Iridomyrmex discors =

Species of ant

Iridomyrmex discors is a species of ant in the genus Iridomyrmex. Described by Auguste-Henri Forel in 1920, it is endemic to Australia. The ant is said to be a general predator or scavenger.
