= Calosoma discors =

Scientific classification
- Kingdom: Animalia
- Phylum: Arthropoda
- Clade: Pancrustacea
- Class: Insecta
- Order: Coleoptera
- Suborder: Adephaga
- Family: Carabidae
- Genus: Calosoma
- Species: C. discors

Binomial name
- Calosoma discors LeConte, 1857

Synonyms
- Callisthenes discors inversus Casey, 1913; Callisthenes discors Lapouge, 1931; Microcallisthenes discors Jeannel, 1940

Species of beetle

Calosoma discors, the different beautiful black searcher, is a species of ground beetle in the subfamily Carabinae. It was described by John Lawrence LeConte in 1857. This species is found in California and Washington, where it inhabits coastal grasslands and oak savannahs in the Sierra Nevada foothills.

Adults are brachypterous.
