= Eugenia discors =

Conservation status
- Critically Endangered (IUCN 3.1)

Scientific classification
- Kingdom: Plantae
- Clade: Tracheophytes
- Clade: Angiosperms
- Clade: Eudicots
- Clade: Rosids
- Order: Myrtales
- Family: Myrtaceae
- Genus: Eugenia
- Species: E. discors

Binomial name
- Eugenia discors McVaugh

Species of plant

Eugenia discors is a species of flowering plant in the family Myrtaceae. It is a shrub or tree endemic to Peru. It is known only from Lamas in San Martín Department, where it grows in lowland Amazon rainforest.

The species was described by Rogers McVaugh in 1958.
