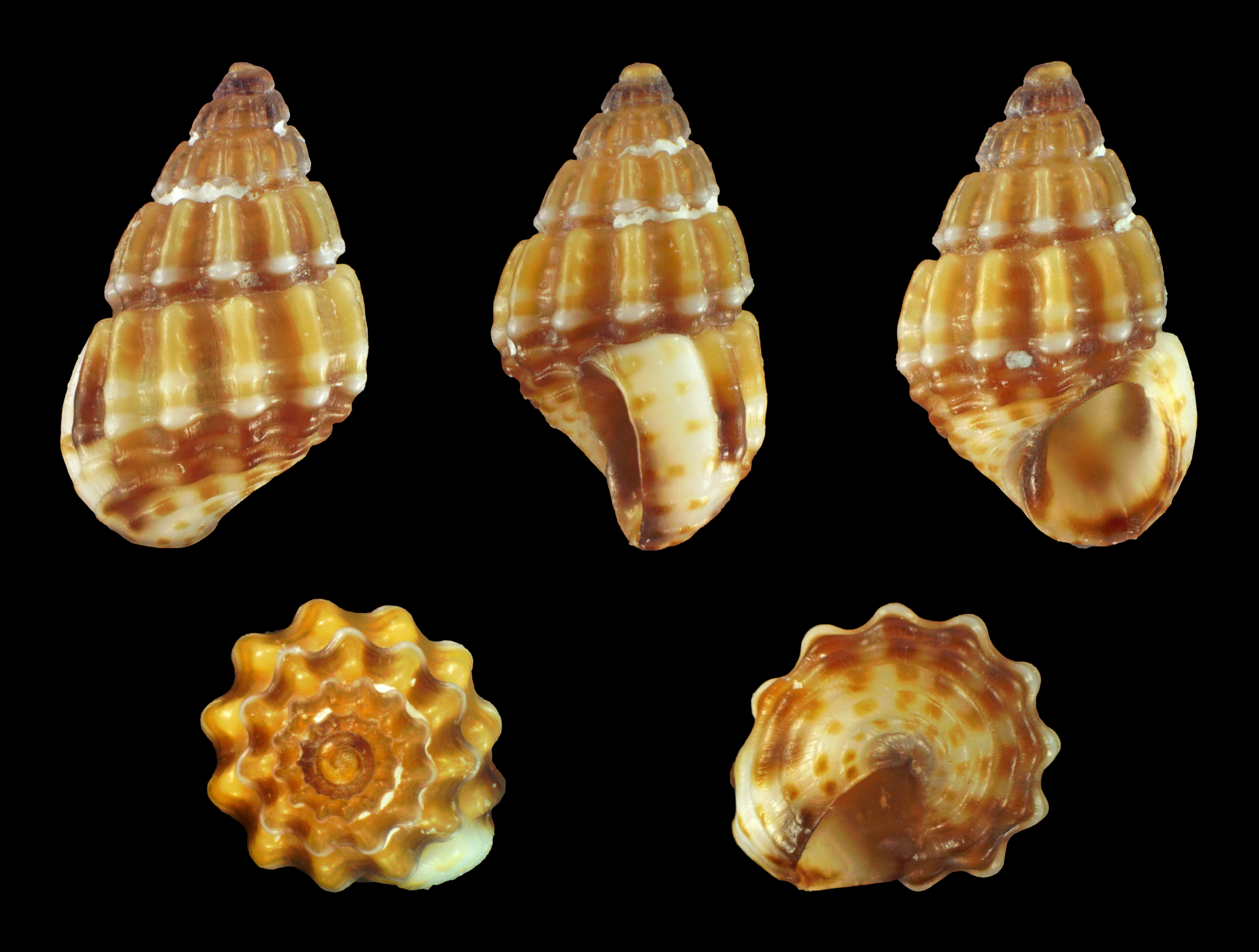

Scientific classification
- Kingdom: Animalia
- Phylum: Mollusca
- Class: Gastropoda
- Subclass: Caenogastropoda
- Order: Littorinimorpha
- Family: Rissoidae
- Genus: Alvania
- Species: A. discors

Binomial name
- Alvania discors (Allan, 1818)

Synonyms
- Alvania boria Risso, 1826; Alvania crassicostata Risso, 1826; Alvania ferruginosa Risso, 1826; Alvania mediterranea Risso, 1826; Alvania montagui (Payraudeau, 1826); Alvania montagui var. asperula Brugnone, 1880; † Alvania montagui var. subampulla Zhizhchenko, 1936 (basionym); Alvania sardea Risso, 1826 (dubious synonym); †Alvania subampulla Zhizhchenko, 1936 (within the variability of R. montagui); Rissoa montacuti Jeffreys, 1884 (unjustified emendation of montagui Payraudeau, 1826); Rissoa montagui Payraudeau, 1826; Rissoa nicolosiana Aradas & Benoit, 1874; Rissoa peloritana Aradas & Benoit, 1874; Turbo discors T. Brown, 1818; Turbo discrepans T. Allan, 1818

= Alvania discors =

Species of gastropod

Alvania discors is a species of minute sea snail, a marine gastropod mollusk or micromollusk in the family Rissoidae.

== Description ==
The length of the shell varies between 4 mm and 5 mm.

(Original description) The shell is pointed and strong. It contains five longitudinal and transverse striae. Inside it is ribbed. The outer lip is thickened. The body is longer than the spire.

(Description as Rissoa montagui) The shell is imperforate and, thick. It is spirally lirate, longitudinally strongly ribbed. It is whitish, yellowish or has a chestnut color, plain or with one or two bands. The shell contains five whorls. The suture is distinct and subchanneled. The aperture is white-lipped and sulcate within, with a white varix externally.

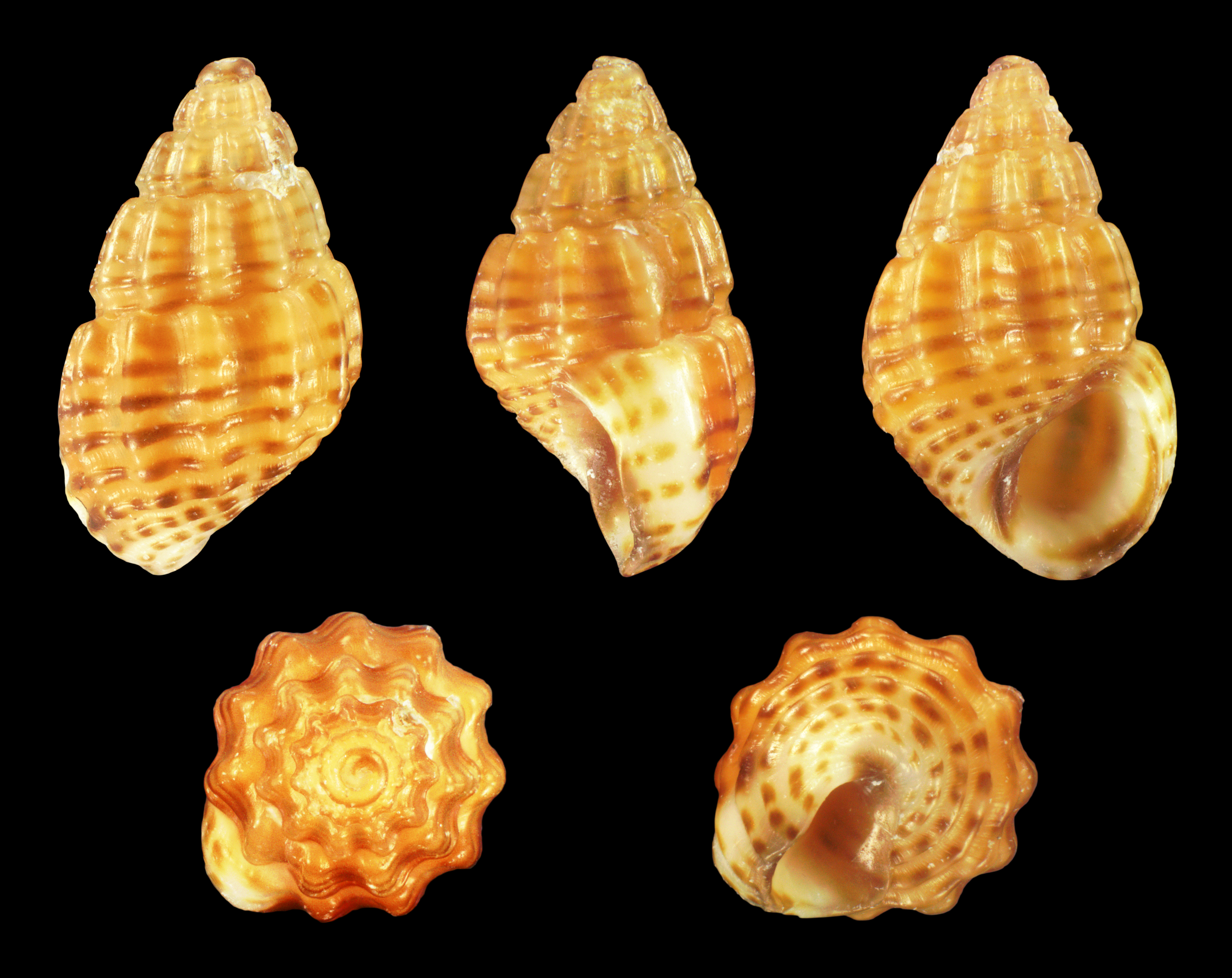
Alvania discors forma peloritana

== Distribution ==
This marine species has a wide distribution. It is found in the following locations:

- European waters
- Mediterranean Sea (Italy, Greece)
- Atlantic Ocean (Canada, USA)
- Pacific Ocean

Fossils have been found in Pleistocene strata near Santa Flavia, Sicily and near Monastir, Tunisia; also in Pliocene strata near Siena, Italy.
