= Parepalpus discors =

Scientific classification
- Kingdom: Animalia
- Phylum: Arthropoda
- Class: Insecta
- Order: Diptera
- Family: Tachinidae
- Subfamily: Tachininae
- Tribe: Tachinini
- Genus: Parepalpus
- Species: P. discors

Binomial name
- Parepalpus discors (Wulp, 1882)

Synonyms
- Gymnomma discors Wulp, 1882

Species of fly

Parepalpus discors is a species of tachinid flies in the genus Parepalpus of the family Tachinidae.

== Distribution ==
Mexico.
