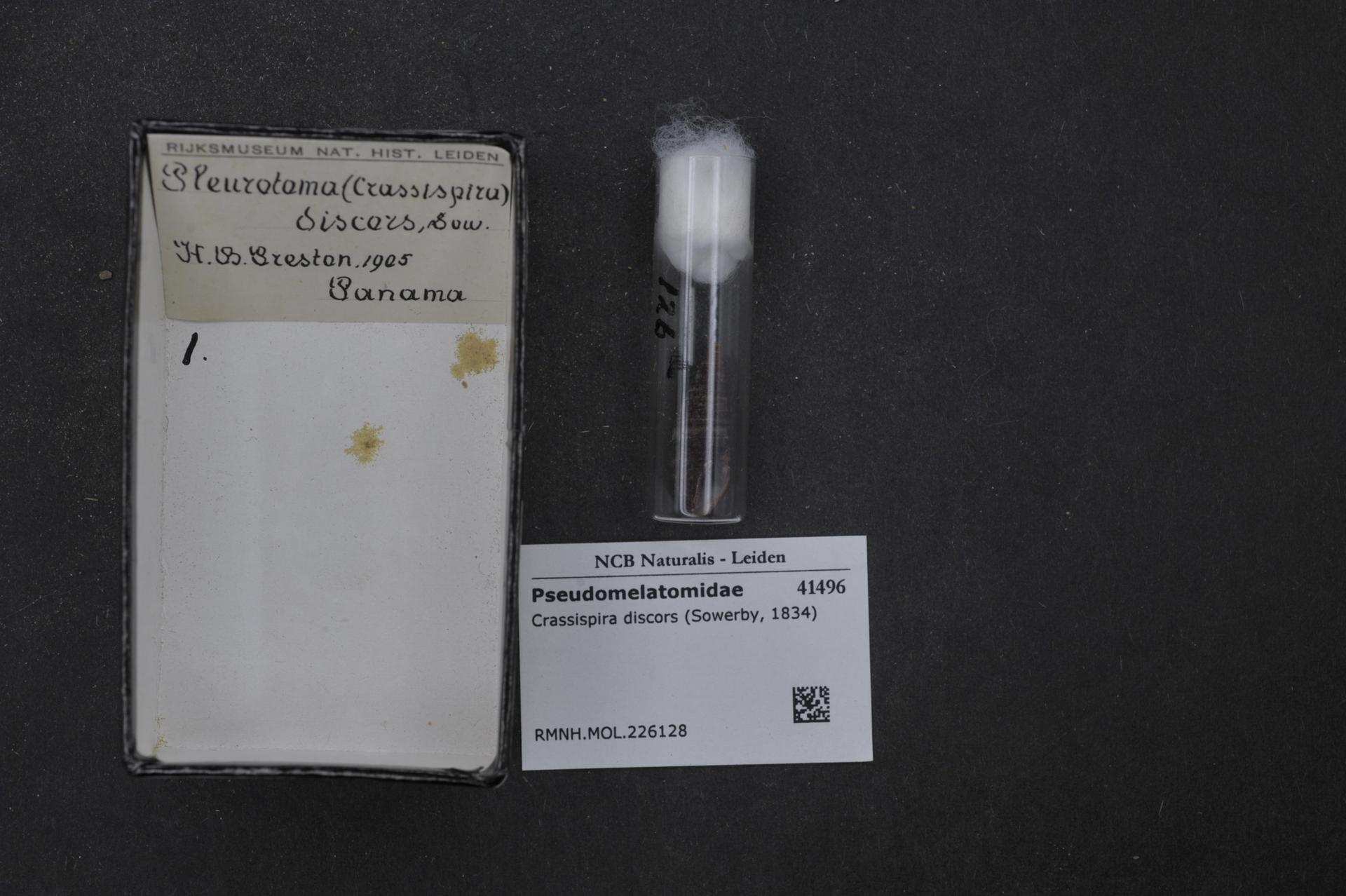

Scientific classification
- Kingdom: Animalia
- Phylum: Mollusca
- Class: Gastropoda
- Subclass: Caenogastropoda
- Order: Neogastropoda
- Superfamily: Conoidea
- Family: Pseudomelatomidae
- Genus: Crassispira
- Species: C. discors

Binomial name
- Crassispira discors (Sowerby I, 1834)

Synonyms
- Crassispira (Crassispirella) discors (Sowerby I, 1834); Drillia discors (Sowerby I, 1834); Pleurotoma discors Sowerby I, 1834

= Crassispira discors =

Species of gastropod

Crassispira discors is a species of sea snail, a marine gastropod mollusk in the family Pseudomelatomidae.

== Description ==
The length of the shell attains 35 mm.

== Biology ==
This species is a predator.

== Distribution ==
This marine species occurs in benthic zones from the Sea of Cortez, Western Mexico to Ecuador.
