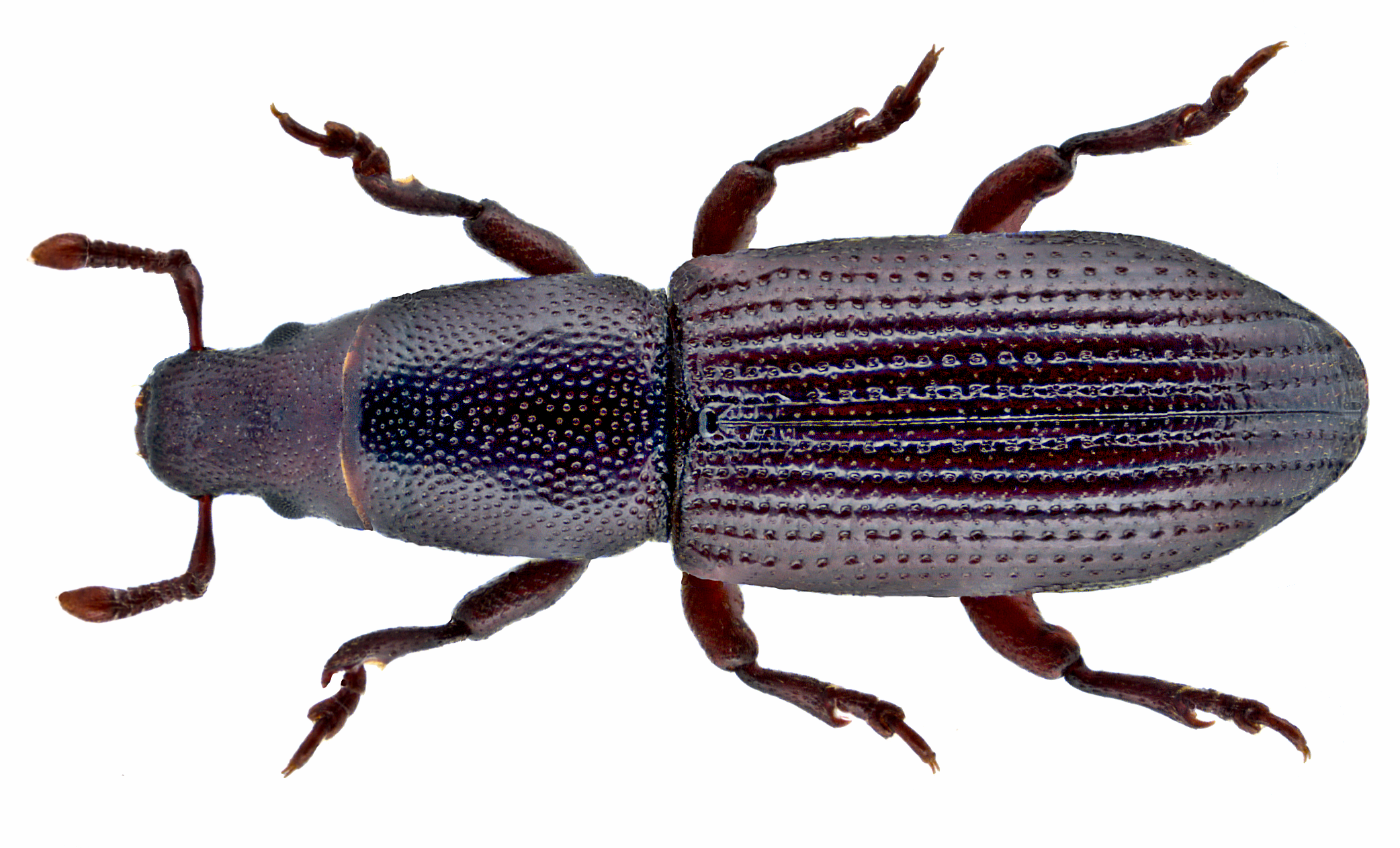
- Rhyncolus ater

Scientific classification
- Kingdom: Animalia
- Phylum: Arthropoda
- Clade: Pancrustacea
- Class: Insecta
- Order: Coleoptera
- Suborder: Polyphaga
- Infraorder: Cucujiformia
- Superfamily: Curculionoidea
- Family: Curculionidae
- Subfamily: Cossoninae
- Tribe: Rhyncolini
- Genus: Rhyncolus; Germar, 1817

Diversity
- at least 140 species

= Rhyncolus =

Genus of beetles

Rhyncolus is a genus of true weevils in the beetle family Curculionidae. There are at least 140 described species in Rhyncolus.

== See also ==
- List of Rhyncolus species
