= Strictispiridae =

Scientific classification
- Kingdom: Animalia
- Phylum: Mollusca
- Class: Gastropoda
- Subclass: Caenogastropoda
- Order: Neogastropoda
- Superfamily: Conoidea
- Family: Strictispiridae; McLean, 1971

Genera
- See text

Synonyms
- Strictispirinae McLean, 1971 (raised to family level)

Family of gastropods

Strictispiridae is a taxonomic family of small predatory sea snails, marine gastropod mollusks in the superfamily Conoidea, the cone snails and their allies.

This family has no subfamilies.

Since 2018, this family has been included in the family Pseudomelatomidae.

== Genera ==
Genera in the family Strictispiridae used to include:

- Cleospira McLean, 1971
  - Cleospira bicolor (Sowerby I, 1834)
  - Cleospira ochsneri (Hertlein & Strong, 1949)
- Strictispira McLean, 1971
  - † Strictispira acurugata (Dall, 1890)
  - Strictispira coltrorum Tippett, 2006
  - Strictispira drangai (Schwengel, 1951)
  - Strictispira ericana (Hertlein & Strong, 1951)
  - Strictispira paxillus (Reeve, 1845)
  - Strictispira redferni Tippett, 2006
  - Strictispira stillmani Shasky, 1971

Species brought into synonymy

- Strictispira solida (C. B. Adams, 1850) : synonym of Clathrodrillia solida (C. B. Adams, 1850)
