= Monilispira =

Scientific classification
- Kingdom: Animalia
- Phylum: Mollusca
- Class: Gastropoda
- Subclass: Caenogastropoda
- Order: Neogastropoda
- Superfamily: Conoidea
- Family: Pseudomelatomidae
- Genus: Monilispira; Bartsch & Rehder, 1939

Type species
- Drillia monilifera Carpenter, 1857

Species
- See text

Genus of gastropods

Monilispira is a genus of sea snails, marine gastropod mollusks in the family Pseudomelatomidae, the turrids and allies.

== Species ==
Species within the genus Monilispira include:

- † Monilispira archeri Olsson & Harbison, 1953
- Monilispira bandata (Nowell-Usticke, 1969)
- † Monilispira bigemma (Dall, 1890)
- Monilispira circumcincta Nowell-Usticke, 1969
- Monilispira lysidia (Duclos, 1850)
- Monilispira monilifera (Carpenter, 1857)

Species brought into synonymy

- Monilispira crassiplicata Kuroda & Oyama, 1971: synonym of Splendrillia crassiplicata (Kuroda & Oyama, 1971)
- Monilispira leucocyma (Dall, 1884): synonym of Pilsbryspira leucocyma (Dall, 1884)
- Monilispira monilis Bartsch & Rehder, 1939: synonym of Pilsbryspira monilis (Bartsch & Rehder, 1939)
- Monilispira ochsneri Hertlein & Strong, 1949: synonym of Cleospira ochsneri (Hertlein & Strong, 1949)
