= Mangelia erminiana =

Scientific classification
- Kingdom: Animalia
- Phylum: Mollusca
- Class: Gastropoda
- Subclass: Caenogastropoda
- Order: Neogastropoda
- Superfamily: Conoidea
- Family: Mangeliidae
- Genus: Mangelia
- Species: M. erminiana

Binomial name
- Mangelia erminiana (Hertlein, L.G. & A.M. Strong, 1951)

Species of gastropod

Mangelia erminiana is a species of sea snail, a marine gastropod mollusk in the family Mangeliidae.

== Description ==
The length of the shell attains 12 mm.

== Distribution ==
This marine species occurs in the Sea of Cortez in Western Mexico.
