= Calliostoma rema =

Scientific classification
- Kingdom: Animalia
- Phylum: Mollusca
- Class: Gastropoda
- Subclass: Vetigastropoda
- Order: Trochida
- Family: Calliostomatidae
- Subfamily: Calliostomatinae
- Genus: Calliostoma
- Species: C. rema

Binomial name
- Calliostoma rema Strong, Hanna & Hertlein, 1933

Synonyms
- Calliostoma (Astele) rema (Strong, A.M., G.D. Hanna & L.G. Hertlein, 1933)

Species of gastropod

Calliostoma rema is a species of sea snail, a marine gastropod mollusk in the family Calliostomatidae.

== Description ==
The length of the shell attains 11 mm.

== Distribution ==
This species occurs in the Pacific Ocean from Mazatlan, Mexico to Ecuador.
