= Crassispira starri =

Scientific classification
- Kingdom: Animalia
- Phylum: Mollusca
- Class: Gastropoda
- Subclass: Caenogastropoda
- Order: Neogastropoda
- Superfamily: Conoidea
- Family: Pseudomelatomidae
- Genus: Crassispira
- Species: C. starri

Binomial name
- Crassispira starri Hertlein, 1927

Extinct species of gastropod

Crassispira starri is an extinct species of sea snail, a marine gastropod mollusk in the family Pseudomelatomidae, the turrids and allies. mollusk in the family

== Description ==
The length of the shell attains 10 mm, its diameter 8.4 mm.

== Distribution ==
Fossils have been found in Miocene strata in Baja California, Mexico; age range: 23.03 to 15.97 Ma
