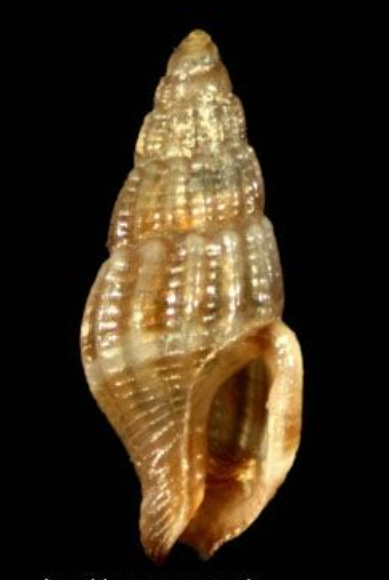
- Shell of Anachis guerreroensis (specimen at the Natural History Museum Rotterdam)

Scientific classification
- Kingdom: Animalia
- Phylum: Mollusca
- Class: Gastropoda
- Subclass: Caenogastropoda
- Order: Neogastropoda
- Family: Columbellidae
- Genus: Anachis
- Species: A. guerreroensis

Binomial name
- Anachis guerreroensis A. M. Strong & Hertlein, 1937

= Anachis guerreroensis =

Species of gastropod

Anachis guerreroensis is a species of sea snail in the family Columbellidae, the dove snails.

== Description ==
The shell attains a length of 4.2 mm, its diameter 1.9 mm.

== Distribution ==
This species occurs in the Pacific Ocean off Mexico, Panama and the Galápagos Islands.
