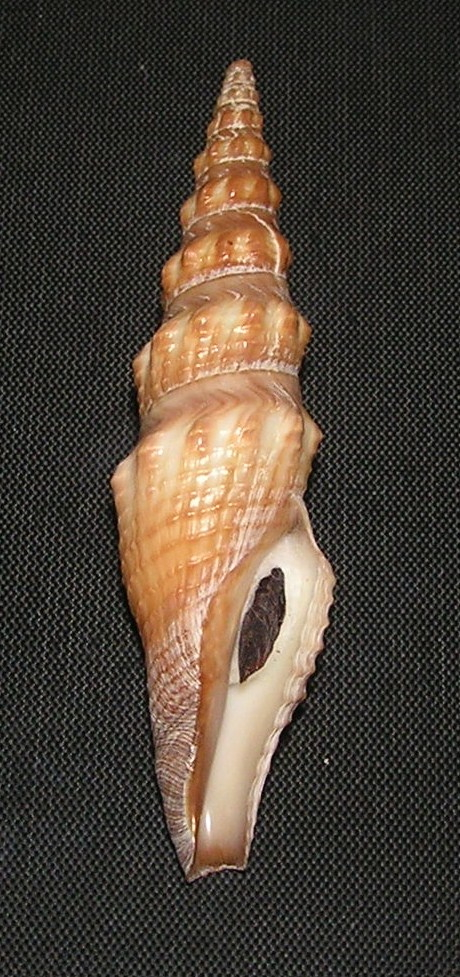
- Apertural view of a shell of Crassispira maura

Scientific classification
- Kingdom: Animalia
- Phylum: Mollusca
- Class: Gastropoda
- Subclass: Caenogastropoda
- Order: Neogastropoda
- Superfamily: Conoidea
- Family: Pseudomelatomidae
- Genus: Crassispira
- Species: C. maura

Binomial name
- Crassispira maura (Sowerby I, 1834)

Synonyms
- Crassispira inaequistriata Li, 1930; Crassispira nigricans Dall, 1919; Crassispira perla Smith, 1947; Knefastia nigricans (Dall, W.H., 1919); Pleurotoma maura Sowerby I, 1834 (original combination)

= Crassispira maura =

Species of gastropod

Crassispira maura, common name the dark-coloured pleurotoma, is a species of sea snail, a marine gastropod mollusk in the family Pseudomelatomidae.

Pleurotoma maura Kiener L.C., 1840 is a synonym of Pilsbryspira aterrima (Sowerby, G.B. I, 1834)

== Description ==
The length of the shell varies between 45 mm and 85 mm.

The turreted shell is acuminated and blackish brown. The whorls are tuberculated in the middle, dotted round the lower part, whilst the upper part exhibits a depression from the rilling up of the sinus. The siphonal canal is recurved.

== Distribution ==
This marine species occurs from Mazatlan, Mexico to Ecuador
