= Crassispira xanti =

Scientific classification
- Kingdom: Animalia
- Phylum: Mollusca
- Class: Gastropoda
- Subclass: Caenogastropoda
- Order: Neogastropoda
- Superfamily: Conoidea
- Family: Pseudomelatomidae
- Genus: Crassispira
- Species: C. xanti

Binomial name
- Crassispira xanti Hertlein & Strong, 1951

Synonyms
- Crassispira (Striospira) xanti Hertlein & Strong, 1951

Species of gastropod

Crassispira xanti is a species of sea snail, a marine gastropod mollusk in the family Pseudomelatomidae.

== Description ==
The length of the shell attains 15 mm.

== Distribution ==
This marine species occurs from Baja California, Mexico, to Panama.
