= Crassispira brujae =

Scientific classification
- Kingdom: Animalia
- Phylum: Mollusca
- Class: Gastropoda
- Subclass: Caenogastropoda
- Order: Neogastropoda
- Superfamily: Conoidea
- Family: Pseudomelatomidae
- Genus: Crassispira
- Species: C. brujae

Binomial name
- Crassispira brujae Hertlein & Strong, 1951

Species of gastropod

Crassispira brujae is a species of sea snail, a marine gastropod mollusk in the family Pseudomelatomidae.

== Description ==
The length of the shell attains 30 mm.

== Distribution ==
This marine species occurs in the southern part of the Sea of Cortez in Western Mexico.
