= Turbonilla nicarasana =

Scientific classification
- Kingdom: Animalia
- Phylum: Mollusca
- Class: Gastropoda
- Family: Pyramidellidae
- Genus: Turbonilla
- Species: T. nicarasana

Binomial name
- Turbonilla nicarasana Hertlein & Strong, 1951

Synonyms
- Turbonilla (Chemnitzia) nicarasana Hertlein & Strong, 1951

Species of gastropod

Turbonilla nicarasana is a species of sea snail, a marine gastropod mollusk in the family Pyramidellidae, the pyrams and their allies.

== Distribution ==
This species occurs in the Caribbean Sea off Nicaragua.
