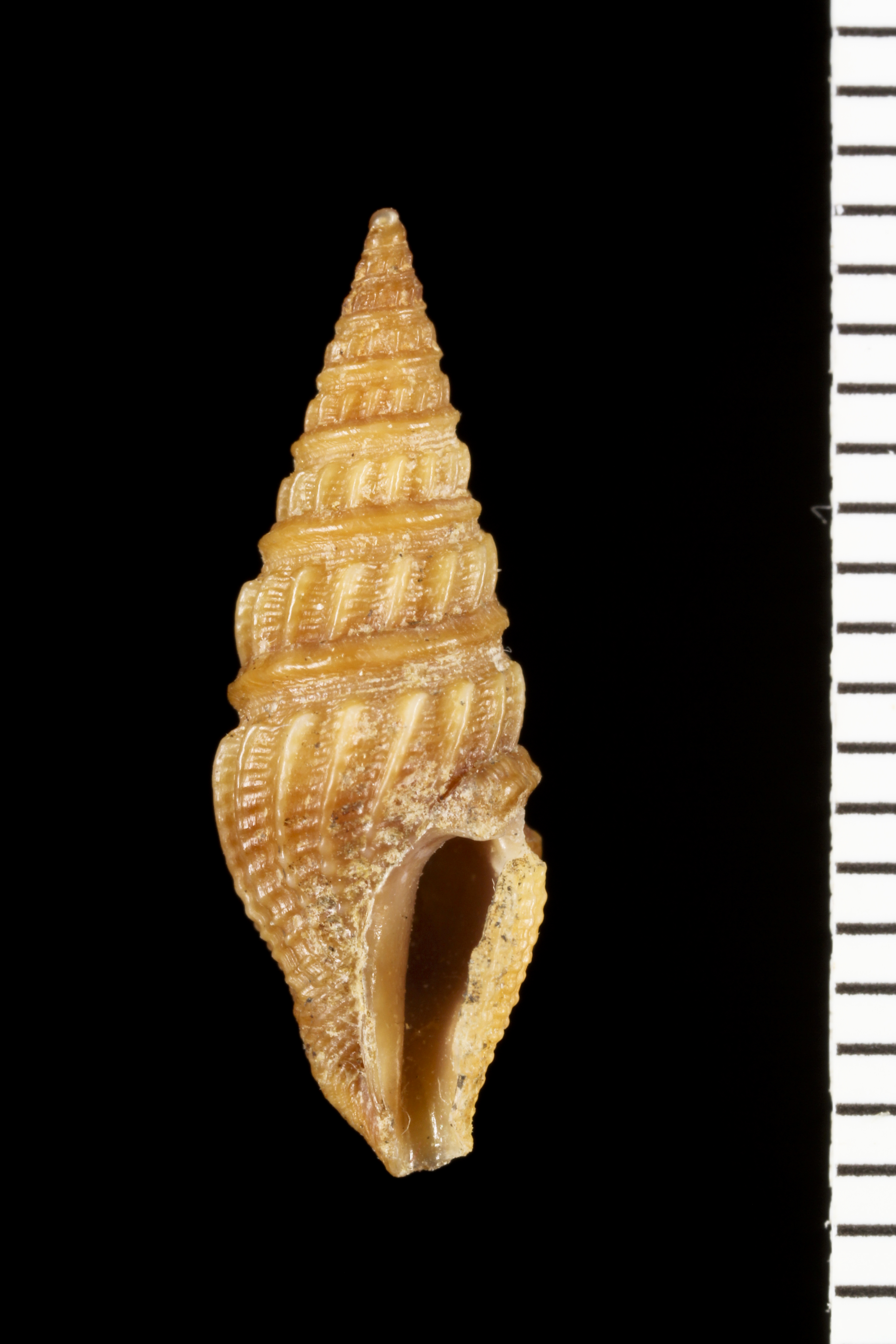
- Shell of Strictispira redferni (specimen at MNHN, Paris)

Scientific classification
- Kingdom: Animalia
- Phylum: Mollusca
- Class: Gastropoda
- Subclass: Caenogastropoda
- Order: Neogastropoda
- Superfamily: Conoidea
- Family: Pseudomelatomidae
- Genus: Strictispira; McLean, 1971

Type species
- Crassispira ericana Hertlein & A. M. Strong, 1951

Species
- See text

= Strictispira =

Genus of gastropods

Strictispira is a genus of sea snails, marine gastropod mollusks in the family Pseudomelatomidae, the turrids and allies.

== Taxonomy ==
Previously this genus was included in the family Turridae, subfamily Strictispirinae. Taylor et al. (1993) elevated this subfamily to the rank of family Strictispiridae. M.G. Faber (2007) stated that these species were conchological identical to Crassispira, but differ by a different radula type and buccal mass. But then he opinioned that this did not reflect a deep, subfamily-level phylogeny.

== Species ==
Species within the genus Strictispira include:

- † Strictispira acurugata (Dall, 1890)
- Strictispira coltrorum Tippett, 2006
- Strictispira drangai (Schwengel, 1951)
- Strictispira ericana (Hertlein & A. M. Strong, 1951)
- Strictispira paxillus (Reeve, 1845)
- Strictispira redferni Tippett, 2006
- Strictispira stillmani Shasky, 1971

Species brought into synonymy

- Strictispira solida (C. B. Adams, 1850) : synonym of Clathrodrillia solida (C. B. Adams, 1850)
