= Turbonilla academica =

Scientific classification
- Kingdom: Animalia
- Phylum: Mollusca
- Class: Gastropoda
- Family: Pyramidellidae
- Genus: Turbonilla
- Species: T. academica

Binomial name
- Turbonilla academica Strong & Hertlein, 1939

Species of gastropod

Turbonilla academica is a species of sea snail, a marine gastropod mollusk in the family Pyramidellidae, the pyrams and their allies.
