= Crassispira ballenaensis =

Scientific classification
- Kingdom: Animalia
- Phylum: Mollusca
- Class: Gastropoda
- Subclass: Caenogastropoda
- Order: Neogastropoda
- Superfamily: Conoidea
- Family: Pseudomelatomidae
- Genus: Crassispira
- Species: C. ballenaensis

Binomial name
- Crassispira ballenaensis Hertlein & Strong, 1951

Synonyms
- Propebela ballenaensis Hertlein & Strong, 1951

Species of gastropod

Crassispira ballenaensis is a species of sea snail, a marine gastropod mollusk in the family Pseudomelatomidae. The parent species of Crassispira ballenaensis is the Crassispira Swainson.

== Description ==
The length of the shell attains 33 mm.

== Distribution ==
This marine species is found from Tenacatita Bay, Mexico to Costa Rica.
