= Anachis ritteri =

Scientific classification
- Kingdom: Animalia
- Phylum: Mollusca
- Class: Gastropoda
- Subclass: Caenogastropoda
- Order: Neogastropoda
- Family: Columbellidae
- Genus: Anachis
- Species: A. ritteri

Binomial name
- Anachis ritteri Hertlein & A. M. Strong, 1951

Species of gastropod

Anachis ritteri is a species of sea snail in the family Columbellidae, the dove snails.

== Description ==
The shell attains a length of 7.4 mm, its diameter is 3.8 mm.

== Distribution ==
This species occurs in the Pacific Ocean off Mexico, Panama and Ecuador.
