= Anachis hannana =

Scientific classification
- Kingdom: Animalia
- Phylum: Mollusca
- Class: Gastropoda
- Subclass: Caenogastropoda
- Order: Neogastropoda
- Family: Columbellidae
- Genus: Anachis
- Species: A. hannana

Binomial name
- Anachis hannana Hertlein & A. M. Strong, 1951

Synonyms
- Anachis coronata hannana Hertlein & A. M. Strong, 1951

Species of gastropod

Anachis hannana is a species of sea snail in the family Columbellidae, the dove snails.

== Description ==
The shell attains a length of 13.6 mm, and a diameter of 6.3 mm.

== Distribution ==
This species occurs in the Pacific Ocean off Mexico and Panama.
