= Turbonilla meanguerensis =

Scientific classification
- Kingdom: Animalia
- Phylum: Mollusca
- Class: Gastropoda
- Family: Pyramidellidae
- Genus: Turbonilla
- Species: T. meanguerensis

Binomial name
- Turbonilla meanguerensis Hertlein & Strong, 1951

Species of mollusc

Turbonilla meanguerensis is a species of sea snail, a marine gastropod mollusk in the family Pyramidellidae, the pyrams and their allies.
