= Anachis sinaloa =

Scientific classification
- Kingdom: Animalia
- Phylum: Mollusca
- Class: Gastropoda
- Subclass: Caenogastropoda
- Order: Neogastropoda
- Family: Columbellidae
- Genus: Anachis
- Species: A. sinaloa

Binomial name
- Anachis sinaloa A. M. Strong & Hertlein, 1937

Species of gastropod

Anachis sinaloa is a species of sea snail in the family Columbellidae, the dove snails.

== Description ==
The shell attains a length of 4.2 mm, its diameter is 1.8 mm.

== Distribution ==
This species occurs in the Pacific Ocean off Mexico.
