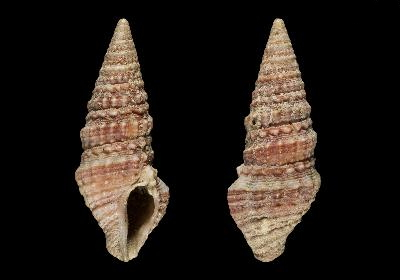
- Shell of Pilsbryspira auberti (syntype at MNHN, Paris)

Scientific classification
- Kingdom: Animalia
- Phylum: Mollusca
- Class: Gastropoda
- Subclass: Caenogastropoda
- Order: Neogastropoda
- Family: Pseudomelatomidae
- Genus: Pilsbryspira
- Species: P. auberti

Binomial name
- Pilsbryspira auberti (Lamy, 1934)

Synonyms
- Drillia auberti Lamy, 1934

= Pilsbryspira auberti =

Species of gastropod

Pilsbryspira auberti is a species of sea snail, a marine gastropod mollusk in the family Pseudomelatomidae, the turrids and allies.

== Description ==
The length of the shell attains 29 mm.

== Distribution ==
This species occurs in the Pacific Ocean off Colón, Panama.
