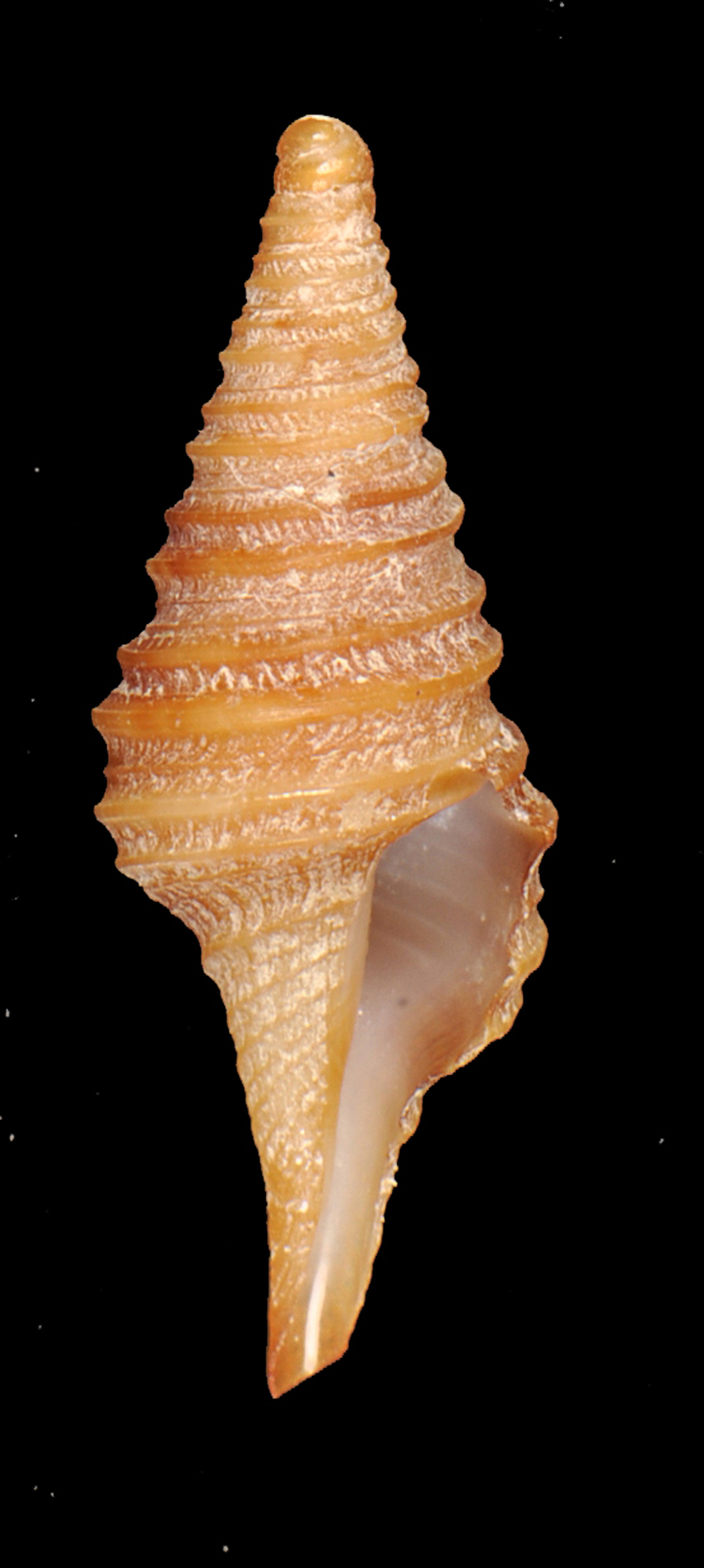
- S Drawing of a shell of Pilsbryspira cinerea (specimen at MNHN, Paris)

Scientific classification
- Kingdom: Animalia
- Phylum: Mollusca
- Class: Gastropoda
- Subclass: Caenogastropoda
- Order: Neogastropoda
- Superfamily: Conoidea
- Family: Pseudomelatomidae
- Genus: Pilsbryspira
- Species: P. cinerea

Binomial name
- Pilsbryspira cinerea (Weinkauff, 1876)

Synonyms
- Pleurotoma cinerea Weinkauff, 1876 (original combination)

= Pilsbryspira cinerea =

Species of gastropod

Pilsbryspira cinerea is a species of sea snail, a marine gastropod mollusk in the family Pseudomelatomidae, the turrids and allies.

== Description ==
The length of the shell attains 20 mm.

== Distribution ==
This species occurs off the West Indies off Martinique.
