= Pilsbryspira melchersi =

Scientific classification
- Kingdom: Animalia
- Phylum: Mollusca
- Class: Gastropoda
- Subclass: Caenogastropoda
- Order: Neogastropoda
- Superfamily: Conoidea
- Family: Pseudomelatomidae
- Genus: Pilsbryspira
- Species: P. melchersi

Binomial name
- Pilsbryspira melchersi (Menke, 1852)

Synonyms
- Pleurotoma melchersi Menke, 1852

Species of gastropod

Pilsbryspira melchersi is a species of sea snail, a marine gastropod mollusk in the family Pseudomelatomidae, the turrids and allies.

== Description ==
The shell attains a length of 9 mm.

== Distribution ==
This species occurs in the Pacific Ocean from Mexico to Panama.
