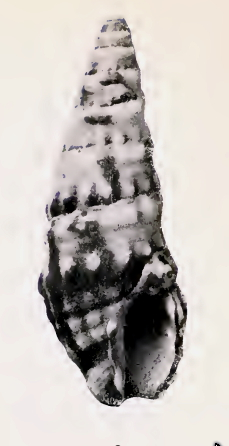
- Original image of a shell of Pilsbryspira amathea

Scientific classification
- Kingdom: Animalia
- Phylum: Mollusca
- Class: Gastropoda
- Subclass: Caenogastropoda
- Order: Neogastropoda
- Superfamily: Conoidea
- Family: Pseudomelatomidae
- Genus: Pilsbryspira
- Species: P. amathea

Binomial name
- Pilsbryspira amathea (Dall, 1919)

Synonyms
- Crassispira amathea Dall, 1919

= Pilsbryspira amathea =

Species of gastropod

Pilsbryspira amathea, common name the mottled turrid, is a species of sea snail, a marine gastropod mollusk in the family Pseudomelatomidae, the turrids and allies.

== Description ==
The length of the shell varies between 15 mm and 30 mm.

(Original description) The solid shell is marbled with brown and white, the brown chiefly as a broad dark peripheral band with a narrower band just behind the siphonal canal. The protoconch is blunt, brown and consists of two smooth whorls. These are followed by about six subsequent whorls. The suture is obscure, appressed, with a strong whitish ridge in front of it behind a rather wide constricted fasciole. The spiral sculpture consists of fine striae covering the whole surface. The axial sculpture consists of (on the body whorl about a dozen short ribs extending from the fasciole to the siphonal canal and most prominent at the shoulder, with three nodules on the basal part of each rib. On the spire they are more like nodules than ribs. The aperture is wide. The outer lip is thickish, with a feeble varix behind it. The anal sulcus is distinct, shallow, with a large subsutural callus. The inner lip shows a moderate layer of enamel the anterior edge of which near the siphonal canal is raised, with a chink between it and the siphonal fasciole. The siphonal canal is wide, deep, very short, constricted, with a well marked siphonal fasciole.

== Distribution ==
This marine species was found off Acapulco, Pacific Ocean, Mexico
