= Monilispira circumcincta =

Scientific classification
- Kingdom: Animalia
- Phylum: Mollusca
- Class: Gastropoda
- Subclass: Caenogastropoda
- Order: Neogastropoda
- Superfamily: Conoidea
- Family: Pseudomelatomidae
- Genus: Monilispira
- Species: M. circumcincta

Binomial name
- Monilispira circumcincta Nowell-Usticke, 1969

Species of gastropod

Monilispira circumcincta is a species of sea snail, a marine gastropod mollusc in the family Pseudomelatomidae, the turrids and allies.

== Distribution ==
This marine species occurs off Grenada and the Virgin Islands.
