= Monilispira bandata =

Scientific classification
- Kingdom: Animalia
- Phylum: Mollusca
- Class: Gastropoda
- Subclass: Caenogastropoda
- Order: Neogastropoda
- Superfamily: Conoidea
- Family: Pseudomelatomidae
- Genus: Monilispira
- Species: M. bandata

Binomial name
- Monilispira bandata (Nowell-Usticke, 1969)

Synonyms
- Crassispira bandata (Nowell-Usticke, 1969); Psarostola bandata Nowell-Usticke, 1969

Species of gastropod

Monilispira bandata is a species of sea snail, a marine gastropod mollusc in the family Pseudomelatomidae.

== Description ==
The length of the shell attains 4.3 mm.

== Distribution ==
This marine species occurs off Barbados and Guadeloupe.
