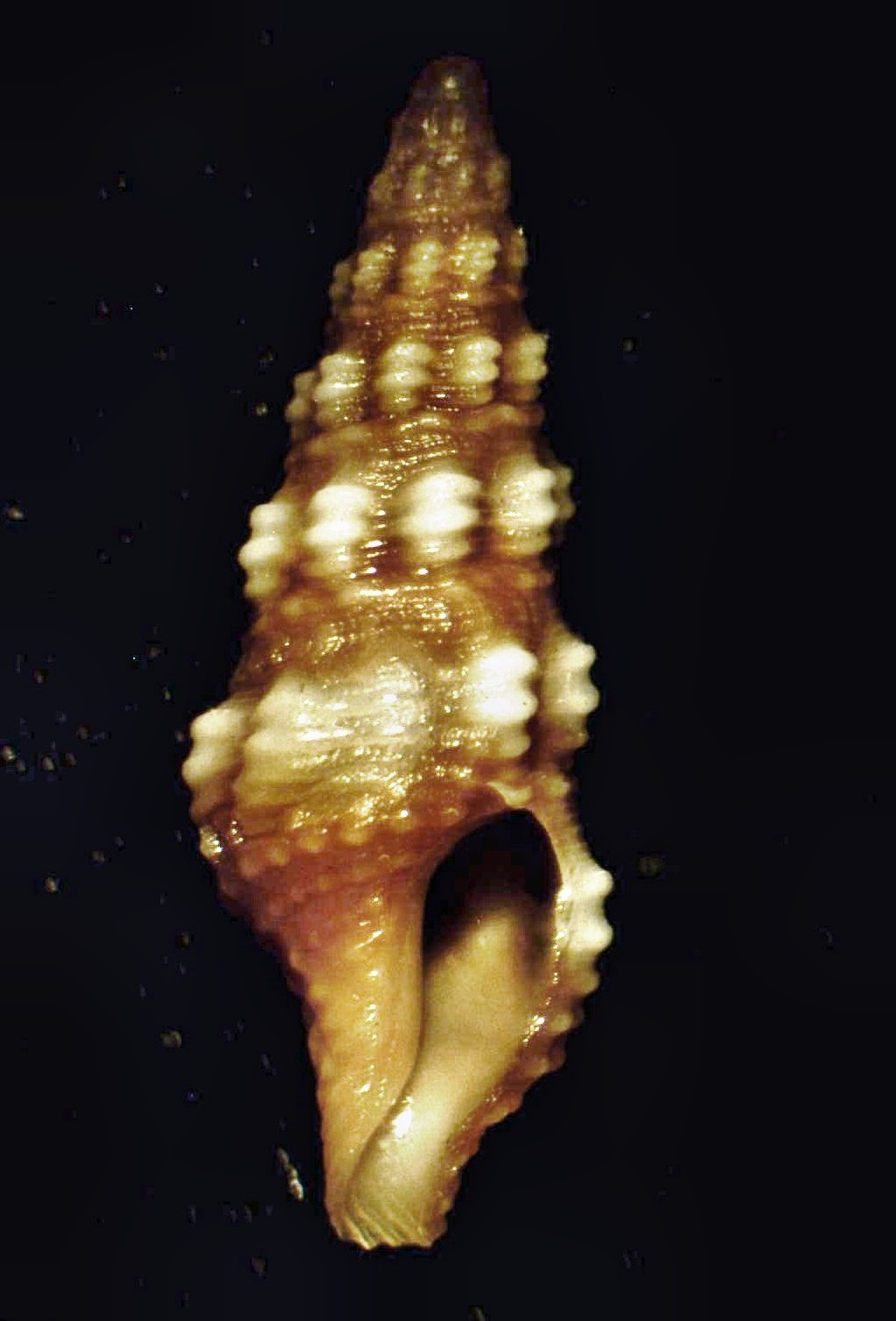
- Pilsbryspira leucocyma shell

Scientific classification
- Kingdom: Animalia
- Phylum: Mollusca
- Class: Gastropoda
- Subclass: Caenogastropoda
- Order: Neogastropoda
- Superfamily: Conoidea
- Family: Pseudomelatomidae
- Genus: Pilsbryspira; Bartsch, 1950

Type species
- Pilsbryspira pilsbryi Bartsch, 1950

Species
- See text

= Pilsbryspira =

Genus of gastropods

Pilsbryspira is a genus of small predatory sea snails, marine gastropod mollusks in the family Pseudomelatomidae.

== Species ==
Species within the genus Pilsbryspira include:

- Pilsbryspira albiguttata (Pilsbry, 1904)
- Pilsbryspira albinodata (Reeve, 1846)
- Pilsbryspira albocincta (C. B. Adams, 1845)
- Pilsbryspira albomaculata (d'Orbigny, 1842)
- Pilsbryspira amathea (Dall, 1919)
- Pilsbryspira arsinoe (Dall, 1919)
- Pilsbryspira aterrima (Sowerby I, 1834)
- Pilsbryspira atramentosa (Smith E. A., 1882)
- Pilsbryspira auberti (Lamy, 1934)
- Pilsbryspira aureonodosa (Pilsbry & Lowe, 1932)
- Pilsbryspira bacchia (Dall, 1919)
- Pilsbryspira cinerea (Weinkauff, 1876)
- Pilsbryspira collaris (Sowerby I, 1834)
- Pilsbryspira elozantha (Ravenel, 1861)
- Pilsbryspira flucki (Brown & Pilsbry, 1913)
- Pilsbryspira garciacubasi Shasky, 1971
- Pilsbryspira jayana (Adams C. B., 1850)
- Pilsbryspira kandai (Kuroda, 1950)
- Pilsbryspira leucocyma (Dall, 1884)
- Pilsbryspira loxospira (Pilsbry & Lowe, 1932)
- Pilsbryspira melchersi (Menke, 1852)
- Pilsbryspira monilis (Bartsch & Rehder, 1939)
- Pilsbryspira nodata (C. B. Adams, 1850)
- Pilsbryspira nymphia (Pilsbry & Lowe, 1932)
- Pilsbryspira umbrosa (Melvill, 1923)
- Pilsbryspira zebroides (Weinkauff & Kobelt, 1876)

Species brought into synonymy

- Pilsbryspira albomaculata (Orbigny, 1842): synonym of Pilsbryspira nodata (C. B. Adams, 1850)
- Pilsbryspira albopustulata Smith, 1882: synonym of Pilsbryspira nodata (C. B. Adams, 1850)
- Pilsbryspira atrior Adams, 1852: synonym of Pilsbryspira aterrima (Sowerby I, 1834)
- Pilsbryspira fonseca Pilsbry & Lowe, 1932: synonym of Pilsbryspira atramentosa (E.A. Smith, 1882)
- Pilsbryspira maura Kiener, 1840: synonym of Pilsbryspira aterrima (Sowerby I, 1834)
- Pilsbryspira nephele Dall, 1919: synonym of Pilsbryspira collaris (Sowerby I, 1834)
- Pilsbryspira ornata D'Orbigny, 1847: synonym of Pilsbryspira albocincta (C. B. Adams, 1845)
- Pilsbryspira pilsbryi Bartsch, 1950: synonym of Pilsbryspira nodata (C. B. Adams, 1850)
- Pilsbryspira rustica Carpenter, 1857: synonym of Pilsbryspira aterrima (Sowerby I, 1834)
- Pilsbryspira zebra Lamarck, J.B.P.A. de, 1822 (nomen dubium): synonym of Pilsbryspira leucocyma (Dall, 1884)
