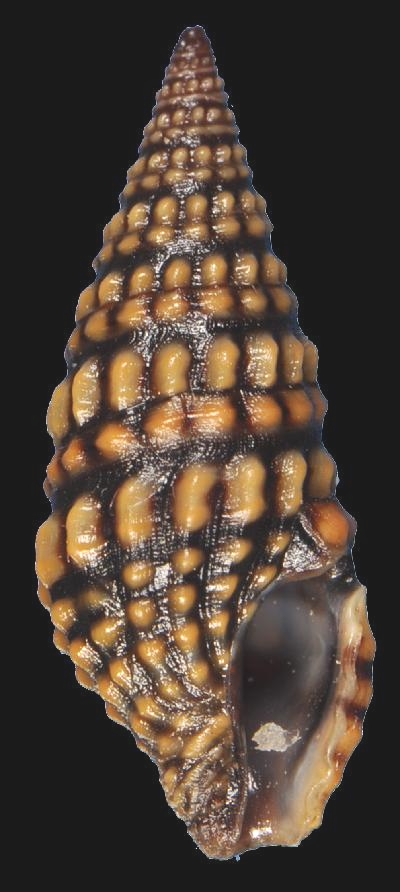
- Shell of Pilsbryspira zebroides (specimen at MNHN, Paris)

Scientific classification
- Kingdom: Animalia
- Phylum: Mollusca
- Class: Gastropoda
- Subclass: Caenogastropoda
- Order: Neogastropoda
- Superfamily: Conoidea
- Family: Pseudomelatomidae
- Genus: Pilsbryspira
- Species: P. zebroides

Binomial name
- Pilsbryspira zebroides (Weinkauff & Kobelt, 1876)

Synonyms
- Crassispira melonesiana Dall & Simpson, 1901; Pleurotoma zebroides Weinkauff & Kobelt, 1876

= Pilsbryspira zebroides =

Species of gastropod

Pilsbryspira zebroides is a species of sea snail, a marine gastropod mollusk in the family Pseudomelatomidae, the turrids and allies.

See also: Crassispira melonesiana (Dall & Simpson, 1901)

== Description ==
The length of the shell attains 14 mm.

== Distribution ==
This species occurs in the Caribbean Sea off Colombia; the Dominican Republic and Jamaica; in the Atlantic Ocean off Northern Brazil.
