= Pilsbryspira elozantha =

Scientific classification
- Kingdom: Animalia
- Phylum: Mollusca
- Class: Gastropoda
- Subclass: Caenogastropoda
- Order: Neogastropoda
- Superfamily: Conoidea
- Family: Pseudomelatomidae
- Genus: Pilsbryspira
- Species: P. elozantha

Binomial name
- Pilsbryspira elozantha (Ravenel, 1861)

Synonyms
- Drillia elozantha Ravenel, 1861

Species of gastropod

Pilsbryspira elozantha is a species of sea snail, a marine gastropod mollusk in the family Pseudomelatomidae, the turrids and allies.

== Description ==
(Original description) The shell is robust and conico-cylindrical. It possesses ten whorls, which are distinctly bicarinate. This bicarination is formed by a deep groove immediately above the suture and another in the upper half of each whorl. The ridge left between these grooves is ornamented by ten strong, yellow, smooth, and shining tubercles. The upper edge of the whorl is also bevelled, forming a second carina, which is entirely non-nodulous.

Below the nodulous carina on the body whorl, there are obsolete ribs, which are crossed by four nodulous ridges. The first of these ridges touches the tubercles of the principal carina. Below these, there are eight additional ridges, some of which are obscurely nodulous. On all parts of the shell not occupied by the tubercles or carinae, there are numerous fine, equidistant striae, requiring magnification to be seen clearly.

The aperture is small. Its outer line is rendered oblique by the deep sinus of the thick outer lip, located just below the suture. The columella is nearly straight and bears a strong callus, the edge of which is thick and well-defined.

The shell's color is generally deep brown, becoming slightly lighter from the tubercles to the suture, encompassing the upper carina. Near the extremity of the siphonal canal, there is a lighter colored band that includes three of the ridges. Beyond that, to the extremity, the color is again almost black.

== Distribution ==
This species occurs off the South Carolina, United States.
