= Pilsbryspira albomaculata =

Scientific classification
- Kingdom: Animalia
- Phylum: Mollusca
- Class: Gastropoda
- Subclass: Caenogastropoda
- Order: Neogastropoda
- Superfamily: Conoidea
- Family: Pseudomelatomidae
- Genus: Pilsbryspira
- Species: P. albomaculata

Binomial name
- Pilsbryspira albomaculata (d'Orbigny, 1842)

Species of gastropod

Pilsbryspira albomaculata is a species of sea snail, a marine gastropod mollusk in the family Pseudomelatomidae. It occurs in the western central Atlantic Ocean, primarily in the Caribbean Sea.
