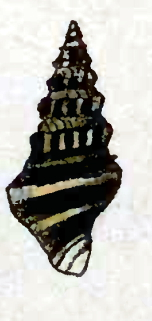
- Drawing of a shell of Pilsbryspira albinodata

Scientific classification
- Kingdom: Animalia
- Phylum: Mollusca
- Class: Gastropoda
- Subclass: Caenogastropoda
- Order: Neogastropoda
- Superfamily: Conoidea
- Family: Pseudomelatomidae
- Genus: Pilsbryspira
- Species: P. albinodata

Binomial name
- Pilsbryspira albinodata (Reeve, 1846)

Synonyms
- Drillia albinodata (Reeve, 1846); Pleurotoma albinodata Reeve, 1846 (original description)

= Pilsbryspira albinodata =

Species of gastropod

Pilsbryspira albinodata, common name the white-noded turret, is a species of sea snail, a marine gastropod mollusk in the family Pseudomelatomidae, the turrids.

== Description ==
The length of the shell varies between 12 mm and 23 mm.

== Distribution ==
This ùarine species occurs off Southeast Florida, United States; off the West Indies; in the Pacific Ocean off Panama to Nicaragua
