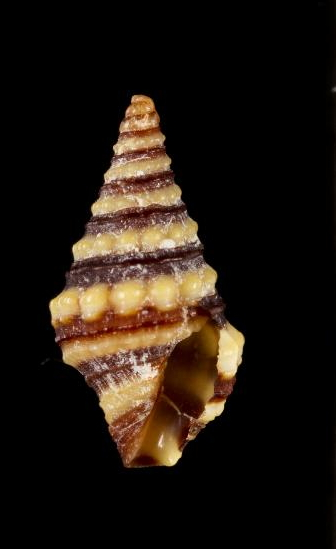
- Shell of Pilsbryspira albocincta (specimen in MNHN, Paris)

Scientific classification
- Kingdom: Animalia
- Phylum: Mollusca
- Class: Gastropoda
- Subclass: Caenogastropoda
- Order: Neogastropoda
- Superfamily: Conoidea
- Family: Pseudomelatomidae
- Genus: Pilsbryspira
- Species: P. albocincta

Binomial name
- Pilsbryspira albocincta (C. B. Adams, 1845)

Synonyms
- Pilsbryspira ornata (D'Orbigny, 1847); Pleurotoma albocincta Adams C. B., 1845; Pleurotoma ornata Orbigny, A.V.M.D. d', 1847

= Pilsbryspira albocincta =

Species of gastropod

Pilsbryspira albocincta, commonly known as the white-banded turret, is a species of sea snail, a marine gastropod mollusk in the turrid family Pseudomelatomidae.

== Description ==
The length of the shell varies between 7 mm and 14 mm. It is composed of alternating stripes of white and then reddish-brown knobs.

== Distribution ==
P. albocincta can be found in Atlantic Ocean waters, ranging from the eastern coast of Florida to the Lesser Antilles.; also off Cuba, Panama and Brazil. It lives in the Benthic zone, 0 to 11 metres above the seafloor.
