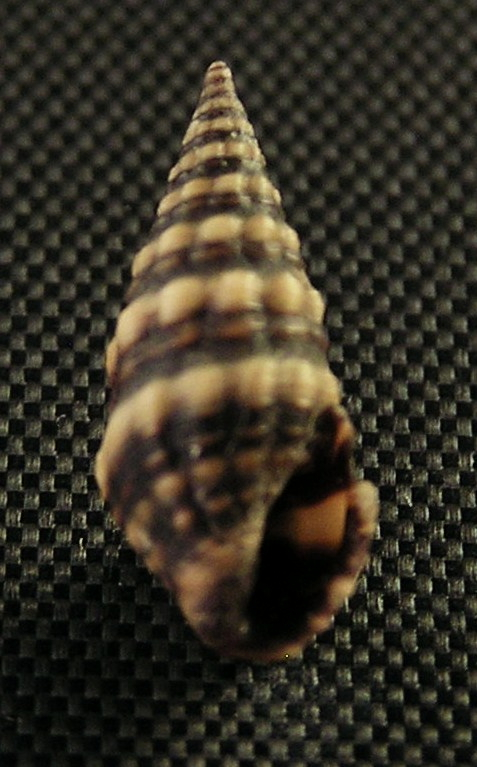
- Shell of Pilsbryspira garciacubasi

Scientific classification
- Kingdom: Animalia
- Phylum: Mollusca
- Class: Gastropoda
- Subclass: Caenogastropoda
- Order: Neogastropoda
- Superfamily: Conoidea
- Family: Pseudomelatomidae
- Genus: Pilsbryspira
- Species: P. garciacubasi

Binomial name
- Pilsbryspira garciacubasi Shasky, 1971

= Pilsbryspira garciacubasi =

Species of gastropod

Pilsbryspira garciacubasi is a species of small predatory sea snail, a marine gastropod mollusk in the family Pseudomelatomidae, the turrids and allies.

== Description ==
The length of the shell varies between 10 mm and 15 mm.

== Distribution ==
This species occurs in the Pacific Ocean between Mexico and Panama.
