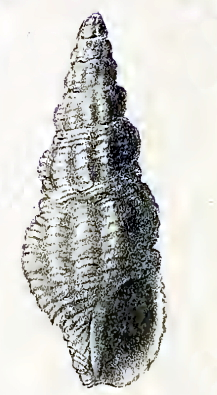
- Original image of a shell of Pilsbryspira umbrosa

Scientific classification
- Kingdom: Animalia
- Phylum: Mollusca
- Class: Gastropoda
- Subclass: Caenogastropoda
- Order: Neogastropoda
- Superfamily: Conoidea
- Family: Pseudomelatomidae
- Genus: Pilsbryspira
- Species: P. umbrosa

Binomial name
- Pilsbryspira umbrosa (Melvill, 1923)

Synonyms
- Mangelia umbrosa Melvill, 1923

= Pilsbryspira umbrosa =

Species of gastropod

Pilsbryspira umbrosa is a species of sea snail, a marine gastropod mollusk in the family Pseudomelatomidae.

== Description ==
The length of the shell attains 12 mm, its diameter 4 mm.

(Original description) The small, narrow shell has a fusiform shape and is of rude sculpture. It is dusky-brown with a rufous tinge over the body whorl and orifice. The shell contains 7-8 whorls (the nepionic being imperfect in the specimens seen), the remainder longitudinally furnished with obtusely-rounded, strong, and frequent ribs, say about fourteen on the body whorl. All the whorls are ventricose, impressed, and spirally plainly ridged suturally, and crossed by strongly developed spirals, swollen and almost becoming nodulous at the points of junction with the costae. The aperture is small and ovate. The outer lip is slightly expanded. The sinus is wide but shallow. The siphonal canal is very short. The columellar margin is oblique.

== Distribution ==
This marine species occurs off Japan.
