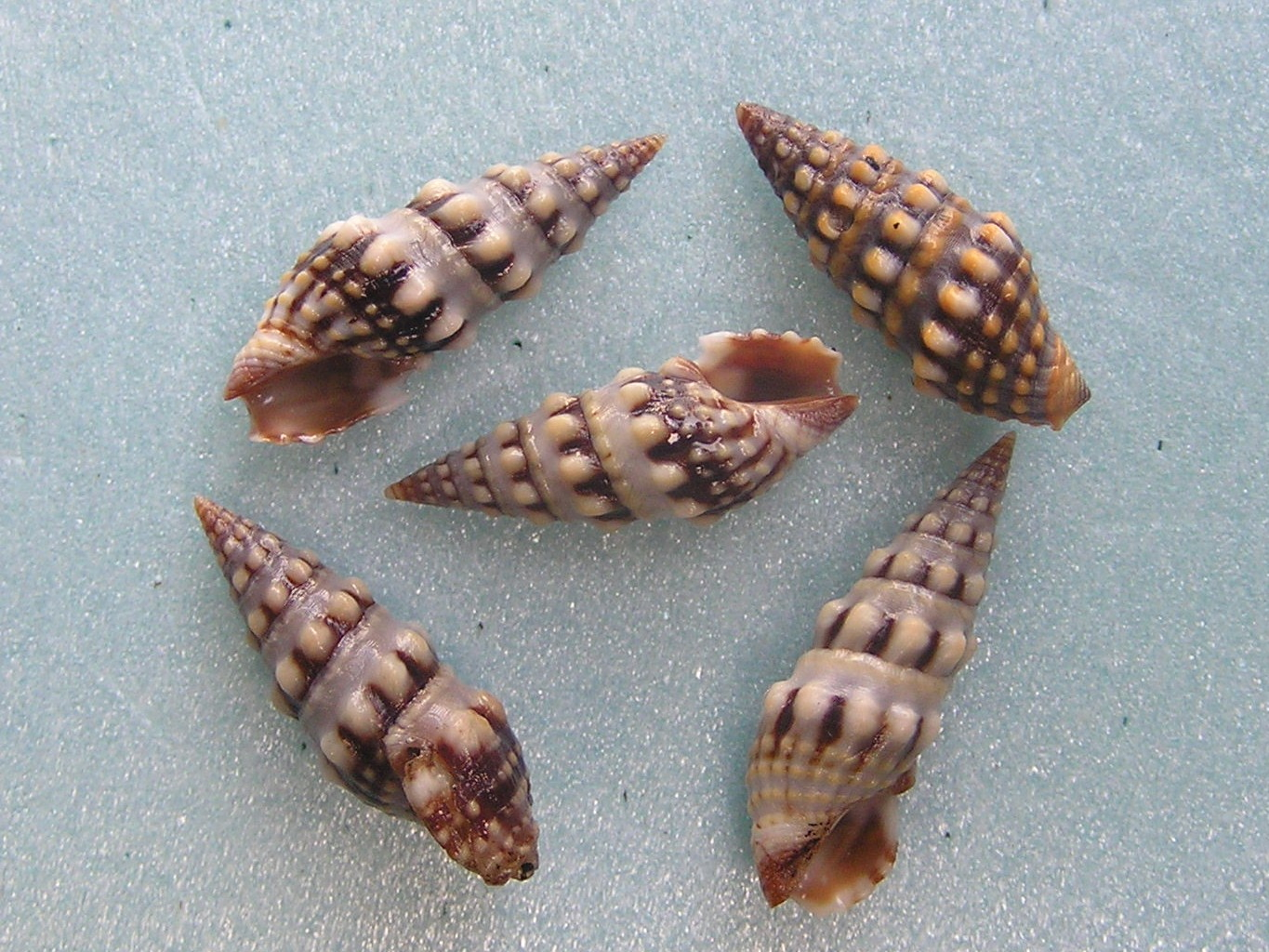
- Shells of Pilsbryspira nymphia

Scientific classification
- Kingdom: Animalia
- Phylum: Mollusca
- Class: Gastropoda
- Subclass: Caenogastropoda
- Order: Neogastropoda
- Superfamily: Conoidea
- Family: Pseudomelatomidae
- Genus: Pilsbryspira
- Species: P. nymphia

Binomial name
- Pilsbryspira nymphia (Pilsbry & H. N. Lowe, 1932)

Synonyms
- Crassispira nymphia Pilsbry & Lowe, 1932; Nymphispira nymphia (Pilsbry & Lowe, 1932)

= Pilsbryspira nymphia =

Species of gastropod

Pilsbryspira nymphia is a species of sea snail, a marine gastropod mollusk in the family Pseudomelatomidae, the turrids and allies.

== Description ==
The length of the shell varies between 12 mm and 18 mm.

== Distribution ==
This species occurs in the Sea of Cortez, Western Mexico to Panama. The type locality is in Baja California, Mexico.
