= Pilsbryspira kandai =

Scientific classification
- Kingdom: Animalia
- Phylum: Mollusca
- Class: Gastropoda
- Subclass: Caenogastropoda
- Order: Neogastropoda
- Superfamily: Conoidea
- Family: Pseudomelatomidae
- Genus: Pilsbryspira
- Species: P. kandai

Binomial name
- Pilsbryspira kandai (Kuroda, 1950)

Synonyms
- Crassispira kandai Kuroda, 1950

Species of gastropod

Pilsbryspira kandai is a species of sea snail, a marine gastropod mollusk in the family Pseudomelatomidae, the turrids and allies.

== Distribution ==
This marine species occurs off Japan.
