= Pilsbryspira loxospira =

Scientific classification
- Kingdom: Animalia
- Phylum: Mollusca
- Class: Gastropoda
- Subclass: Caenogastropoda
- Order: Neogastropoda
- Superfamily: Conoidea
- Family: Pseudomelatomidae
- Genus: Pilsbryspira
- Species: P. loxospira

Binomial name
- Pilsbryspira loxospira (Pilsbry & H. N. Lowe, 1932)

Synonyms
- Crassispira loxospira Pilsbry & H. N. Lowe, 1932 (original combination)

Species of gastropod

Pilsbryspira loxospira is a species of sea snail, a marine gastropod mollusk in the family Pseudomelatomidae, the turrids and allies.

== Description ==
The length of the shell varies between 10 mm and 25 mm.

== Distribution ==
This species occurs in the Pacific Ocean from Mexico to Nicaragua.
