= Monilispira lysidia =

Scientific classification
- Kingdom: Animalia
- Phylum: Mollusca
- Class: Gastropoda
- Subclass: Caenogastropoda
- Order: Neogastropoda
- Superfamily: Conoidea
- Family: Pseudomelatomidae
- Genus: Monilispira
- Species: M. lysidia

Binomial name
- Monilispira lysidia (P.L. Duclos, 1850)

Synonyms
- Columbella lysidia P.L. Duclos, 1850; Crassispira lysidia (Duclos, 1850) (taxon inquirendum)

Species of gastropod

Monilispira lysidia is a species of sea snail, a marine gastropod mollusc in the family Pseudomelatomidae.

== Description ==
The length of the shell attains 9.8 mm.

== Distribution ==
The distribution of the species is largely or completely unknown.
