= Pilsbryspira aureonodosa =

Scientific classification
- Kingdom: Animalia
- Phylum: Mollusca
- Class: Gastropoda
- Subclass: Caenogastropoda
- Order: Neogastropoda
- Family: Pseudomelatomidae
- Genus: Pilsbryspira
- Species: P. aureonodosa

Binomial name
- Pilsbryspira aureonodosa (Pilsbry & H. N. Lowe, 1932)

Synonyms
- Crassispira aureonodosa Pilsbry & H. N. Lowe, 1932 (original combination)

Species of gastropod

Pilsbryspira aureonodosa is a species of sea snail, a marine gastropod mollusk in the family Pseudomelatomidae, the turrids and allies.

== Description ==
The length of the shell attains 10.6 mm, its diameter is 4.7 mm.

== Distribution ==
This marine species occurs off Acapulco, Pacific Ocean, Mexico.
