= Pilsbryspira atramentosa =

Scientific classification
- Kingdom: Animalia
- Phylum: Mollusca
- Class: Gastropoda
- Subclass: Caenogastropoda
- Order: Neogastropoda
- Family: Pseudomelatomidae
- Genus: Pilsbryspira
- Species: P. atramentosa

Binomial name
- Pilsbryspira atramentosa (E.A. Smith, 1882)

Synonyms
- Crassispira fonseca Pilsbry and Lowe, 1932; Pilsbryspira fonseca Pilsbry & Lowe, 1932; Pleurotoma (Crassispira) atramentosa E.A. Smith, 1882

Species of gastropod

Pilsbryspira atramentosa is a species of sea snail, a marine gastropod mollusk in the family Pseudomelatomidae, the turrids and allies.

== Description ==
The length of the shell varies between 9 mm and 17 mm.

== Distribution ==
This species occurs in the Pacific Ocean between Costa Rica and Panama.
