= Monilispira monilifera =

Scientific classification
- Kingdom: Animalia
- Phylum: Mollusca
- Class: Gastropoda
- Subclass: Caenogastropoda
- Order: Neogastropoda
- Superfamily: Conoidea
- Family: Pseudomelatomidae
- Genus: Monilispira
- Species: M. monilifera

Binomial name
- Monilispira monilifera (Carpenter, 1857)

Synonyms
- Crassispira monilifera (Carpenter, 1857); Crassispira (Monilispira) monilifera (Carpenter, 1857); Drillia monilifera Carpenter, 1857 (original combination)

Species of gastropod

Monilispira monilifera, common name one-ridge bullia, is a species of sea snail, a marine gastropod mollusk in the family Pseudomelatomidae.

== Description ==
The length of the shell varies between 10 mm and 40 mm.

== Distribution ==
This marine species occurs in the Pacific Ocean from Mazatlan, Mexico, to Panama.
