= Cleospira =

Scientific classification
- Kingdom: Animalia
- Phylum: Mollusca
- Class: Gastropoda
- Subclass: Caenogastropoda
- Order: Neogastropoda
- Superfamily: Conoidea
- Family: Pseudomelatomidae
- Genus: Cleospira; McLean, 1971

Type species
- Monilispira ochsneri Hertlein & A. M. Strong, 1949

Species
- See text

Genus of gastropods

Cleospira is a genus of sea snails, marine gastropod mollusks in the family Pseudomelatomidae, the turrids and allies.

== Species ==
- Cleospira ochsneri (Hertlein & A. M. Strong, 1949)

Species brought into synonymy

- Cleospira bicolor (Sowerby I, 1834): synonym of Cleospira ochsneri (Hertlein & A. M. Strong, 1949)
