= Strictispira ericana =

Scientific classification
- Kingdom: Animalia
- Phylum: Mollusca
- Class: Gastropoda
- Subclass: Caenogastropoda
- Order: Neogastropoda
- Superfamily: Conoidea
- Family: Pseudomelatomidae
- Genus: Strictispira
- Species: S. ericana

Binomial name
- Strictispira ericana (Hertlein & Strong, 1951)

Synonyms
- Crassispira ericana Hertlein & Strong, 1951

Species of gastropod

Strictispira ericana is a species of small sea snail, a marine gastropod mollusk in the family Pseudomelatomidae, the turrids and allies.

== Description ==
The length of the shell attains 12 mm.

== Distribution ==
This species occurs in the Sea of Cortez, Western Mexico.
