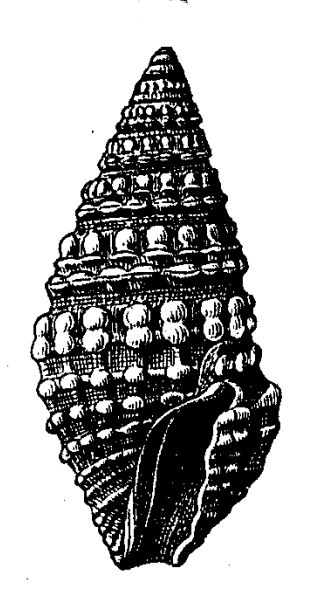
- Original image of a shell of Crassispira melonesiana

Scientific classification
- Kingdom: Animalia
- Phylum: Mollusca
- Class: Gastropoda
- Subclass: Caenogastropoda
- Order: Neogastropoda
- Superfamily: Conoidea
- Family: Pseudomelatomidae
- Genus: Crassispira
- Species: C. melonesiana

Binomial name
- Crassispira melonesiana (W. H. Dall & C. T. Simpson, 1901)

Synonyms
- Drillia melonesiana Dall & Simpson, 1901 (original combination); Pilsbryspira zebroides (Weinkauff & Kobelt, 1876)

= Crassispira melonesiana =

Species of sea snail

Crassispira melonesiana is a species of sea snail, a marine gastropod mollusk in the family Pseudomelatomidae.

== Description ==
The length of the shell attains 10 mm, its diameter 4 mm.

(Original description) the small, solid, strong shell is spindle-shaped, with one or two smooth nepionic and eight strongly sculptured subsequent whorls. The holotype is of an ashy brown (possibly in some cases nearly or quite black) with the sculptural prominences white. The notch is short, subcircular, leaving a narrow, strongly excavated fasciole separated from the suture behind it by a line of half-moon-shaped nodules, though the fasciole is so narrow and deep that at first sight it would be taken for the suture. The sculpture is essentially as figured, with fine interstitial spirals reticulated by the incremental lines. The aperture is narrow, not lirate. The columella and the throat are brownish.

== Distribution ==
This marine species occurs off Puerto Rico
