= Monilispira bigemma =

Scientific classification
- Kingdom: Animalia
- Phylum: Mollusca
- Class: Gastropoda
- Subclass: Caenogastropoda
- Order: Neogastropoda
- Superfamily: Conoidea
- Family: Pseudomelatomidae
- Genus: Monilispira
- Species: M. bigemma

Binomial name
- Monilispira bigemma (W. H. Dall, 1890 )

Extinct species of gastropod

Monilispira bigemma is an extinct species of sea snail, a marine gastropod mollusc in the family Pseudomelatomidae.

== Description ==
The length of the shell attains 16 mm.

== Distribution ==
Fossils were found in Pliocene strata in Florida, United States.
