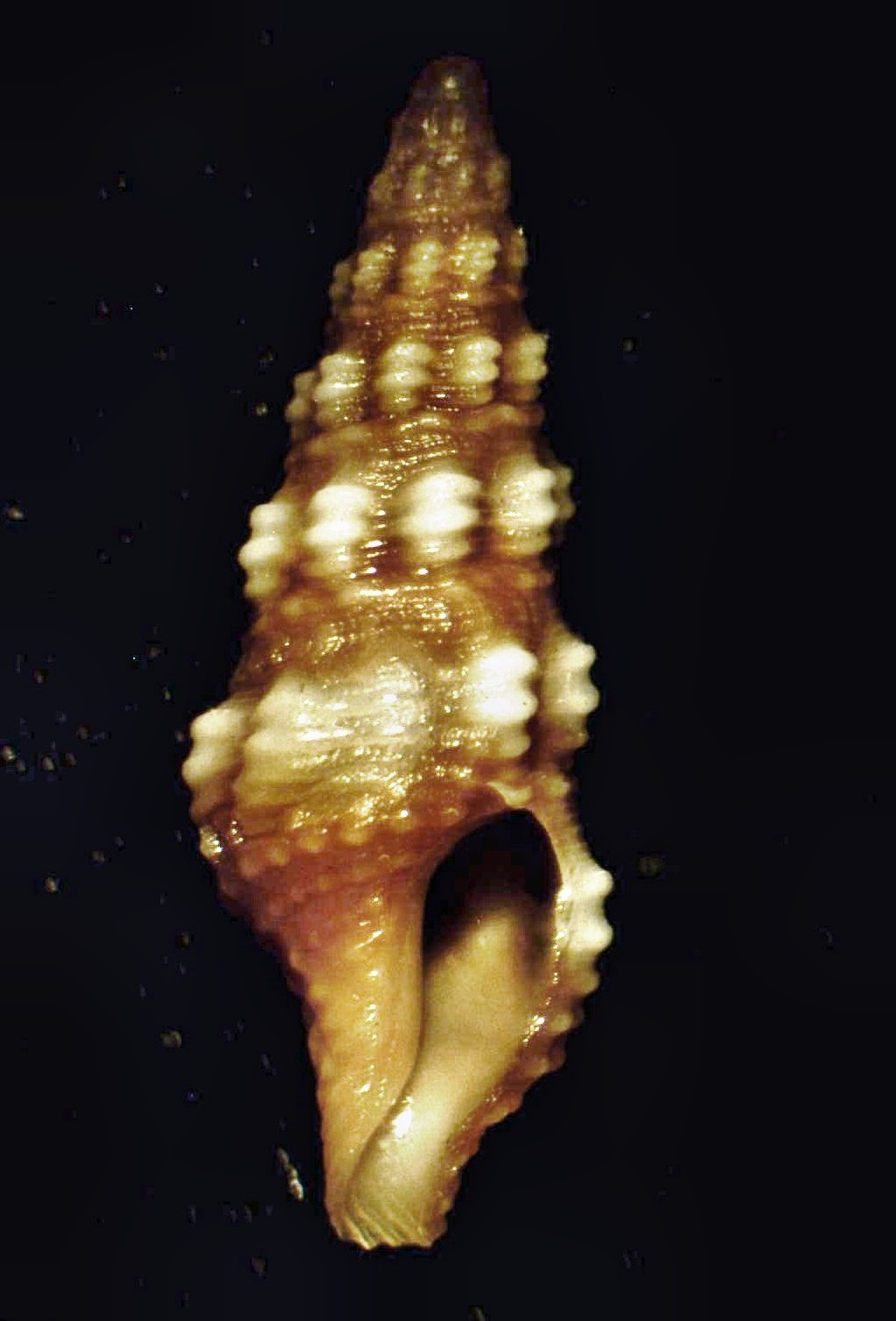
- Shell of Pilsbryspira leucocyma

Scientific classification
- Kingdom: Animalia
- Phylum: Mollusca
- Class: Gastropoda
- Subclass: Caenogastropoda
- Order: Neogastropoda
- Superfamily: Conoidea
- Family: Pseudomelatomidae
- Genus: Pilsbryspira
- Species: P. leucocyma

Binomial name
- Pilsbryspira leucocyma (Dall, 1884)

Synonyms
- Buccinum zebra Lamarck, J.B.P.A. de, 1822; Crassispira (Monilifera) leucocyma (Dall, 1884); Drillia zebra var. leucocyma Dall, 1884; Monilispira leucocyma Dall, 1884; Pilsbryspira zebra Lamarck, J.B.P.A. de, 1822 (nomen dubium)

= Pilsbryspira leucocyma =

Species of gastropod

Pilsbryspira leucocyma, common name the white-knobbed turret, is a species of sea snail, a marine gastropod mollusk in the family Pseudomelatomidae, the turrids and allies.

== Description ==
The length of the shell varies between 12 mm and 20 mm.

Compared with Drillia albomaculata, (d'Orbigny, 1842) (now synonym of Pilsbryspira nodata (C. B. Adams, 1850) ), it is more slender, with the periphery-angle bearing a pair of close revolving ribs, more conspicuous than the rest of the spiral sculpture and tipped with white where crossing the longitudinal ribs.

In the typical Drillia albomaculata the coloring is similar, but a single broader rib revolves at the periphery. In some specimens, however, there is a more or less distinct impressed line on the middle of the rib, so approximating it to this variety.

== Distribution ==
P. leucocyma can be found in Atlantic Ocean waters, ranging from the eastern coast of Florida south to Brazil.
