= Pilsbryspira flucki =

Scientific classification
- Kingdom: Animalia
- Phylum: Mollusca
- Class: Gastropoda
- Subclass: Caenogastropoda
- Order: Neogastropoda
- Superfamily: Conoidea
- Family: Pseudomelatomidae
- Genus: Pilsbryspira
- Species: P. flucki

Binomial name
- Pilsbryspira flucki (Brown & Pilsbry, 1913)

Synonyms
- Crassispira flucki (Brown & Pilsbry, 1913); Drillia harfordiana flucki Brown & Pilsbry, 1913 (original combination)

Species of gastropod

Pilsbryspira flucki is a species of sea snail, a marine gastropod mollusk in the family Pseudomelatomidae, the turrids and allies.

== Description ==
The length of the shell varies between 20 mm and 37 mm.

(Original description) The shell is similar to Drillia harfordiana var. colonensis except in the following details. The axial ribs are much more numerous, seventeen on the penultimate whorl. On the body whorl they diminish very rapidly below the periphery, and the spiral cords are noticeably enlarged and prominent on the summits of the ribs. The 6th and 7th below the shoulder are white. From the shoulder to the suture the surface is buff-white, and the growth striae somewhat lamellar. Elsewhere the shell is dark mineral-red.

== Distribution ==
P. flucki can be found in the waters from Campeche to Colombia.; also off Cuba; fossils were found in Pleistocene strata from the Isthmus of Panama: age range: 19.3 x 8.0 Ma.
