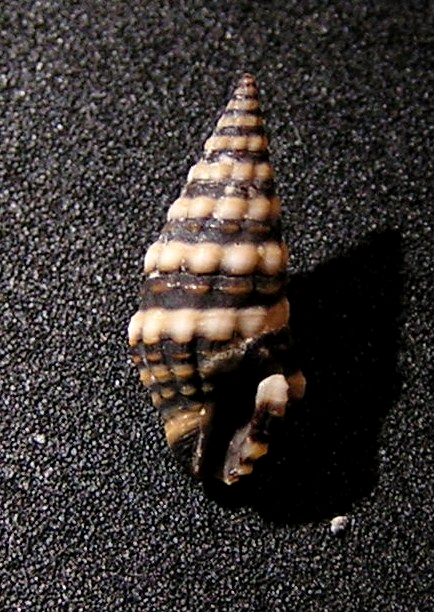
- Shell of Pilsbryspira jayana

Scientific classification
- Kingdom: Animalia
- Phylum: Mollusca
- Class: Gastropoda
- Subclass: Caenogastropoda
- Order: Neogastropoda
- Superfamily: Conoidea
- Family: Pseudomelatomidae
- Genus: Pilsbryspira
- Species: P. jayana

Binomial name
- Pilsbryspira jayana (Adams C. B., 1850)

Synonyms
- Drillia jayana (Adams C. B., 1850); Pleurotoma jayana Adams C. B., 1850

= Pilsbryspira jayana =

Species of gastropod

Pilsbryspira jayana is a species of sea snail, a marine gastropod mollusk in the family Pseudomelatomidae, the turrids and allies.

== Description ==
The length of the shell varies between 9 mm and 15 mm.

== Distribution ==
This marine species occurs from Eastern Florida, United States to Panama; off Jamaica; and the Virgin Islands.
