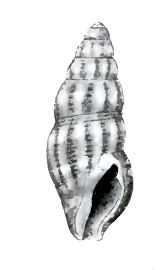
- Original image of a shell of Pilsbryspira albiguttata

Scientific classification
- Kingdom: Animalia
- Phylum: Mollusca
- Class: Gastropoda
- Subclass: Caenogastropoda
- Order: Neogastropoda
- Superfamily: Conoidea
- Family: Pseudomelatomidae
- Genus: Pilsbryspira
- Species: P. albiguttata

Binomial name
- Pilsbryspira albiguttata (Pilsbry, 1904)

Synonyms
- Drillia albiguttata Pilsbry, 1904

= Pilsbryspira albiguttata =

Species of gastropod

Pilsbryspira albiguttata is a species of sea snail, a marine gastropod mollusk in the family Pseudomelatomidae, the turrids and allies.

== Description ==
The length of the shell attains 11 mm, its diameter 4.5 mm.

(Original description) This species, of which only more or less beachworn specimens have been received, is extremely similar to Drillia zebra Lamarck, 1822 (synonym of Inquisitor zebra (Lamarck, 1822) ) of the West Indies. It is somewhat more slender. The ground color is chocolate. The sculpture consists of thick longitudinal ribs, 12 on the body whorl, each with a white spot at the shoulder, another below the middle of the body whorl, and there is a white band around the siphonal fasciole. There is a seamlike welt below the suture, and the unworn intervals between the ribs are sculptured with alternately large and small spiral cords. Whether these pass over the ribs or not cannot be ascertained from the examples examined. The lip and anal sinus are like those parts in Drillia zebra.

== Distribution ==
This marine species occurs off Japan
