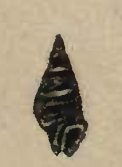
- Drawing of a shell of Pilsbryspira collaris

Scientific classification
- Kingdom: Animalia
- Phylum: Mollusca
- Class: Gastropoda
- Subclass: Caenogastropoda
- Order: Neogastropoda
- Family: Pseudomelatomidae
- Genus: Pilsbryspira
- Species: P. collaris

Binomial name
- Pilsbryspira collaris (Sowerby I, 1834)

Synonyms
- Drillia collaris (G.B. Sowerby I, 1834); Pilsbryspira nephele Dall, 1919; Pleurotoma collaris Sowerby I, 1834

= Pilsbryspira collaris =

Species of gastropod

Pilsbryspira collaris is a species of sea snail, a marine gastropod mollusk in the family Pseudomelatomidae.

== Description ==
The length of the shell varies between 10 mm and 14 mm.

== Distribution ==
This species occurs in the Pacific Ocean from Mazatlan, Mexico to northern Peru.
