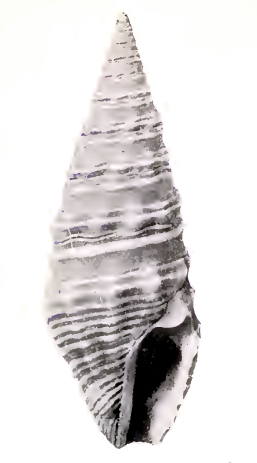
- Original image of a shell of Pilsbryspira bacchia

Scientific classification
- Kingdom: Animalia
- Phylum: Mollusca
- Class: Gastropoda
- Subclass: Caenogastropoda
- Order: Neogastropoda
- Superfamily: Conoidea
- Family: Pseudomelatomidae
- Genus: Pilsbryspira
- Species: P. bacchia

Binomial name
- Pilsbryspira bacchia (Dall, 1919)

Synonyms
- Crassispira bacchia Dall, 1919

= Pilsbryspira bacchia =

Species of gastropod

Pilsbryspira bacchia is a species of sea snail, a marine gastropod mollusk in the family Pseudomelatomidae, the turrids and allies.

== Description ==
The shell grows to a length of 15 mm, its diameter 5.5 mm.

(Original description) The solid, biconic, acute shell is slate gray with whitish projections. The protoconch (eroded) consists of two brownish whorls, apparently smooth. It is followed by nine subsequent whorls. The suture is distinct, appressed, bordered by a small thread behind and a strong white cord in front betAveen it and the fascicle which is constricted narrow and minutely spirally striated. The other spiral sculpture consists of (on the spire two) peripheral whitish cords, the anterior stronger and swollen where it passes over the ribs. On the body whorl in front of the periphery are seven similar but smaller cords with wider, minutely striated interspaces sometimes carrying an intercalary thread. On the siphonal canal are about half a dozen close-set threads. The axial sculpture consists of (on the body whorl 10) short rounded ribs prominent only on the periphery and extending from the fasciole to the siphonal canal, with subequal interspaces. There is also a prominent rounded varix behind the outer lip. The outer lip is sharp-edged, smooth internally. The anal sulcus is conspicuous, rounded, short, with a strong subsutural callus. The inner lip is erased, dark purple as well as the throat. The columella is straight and short. The siphonal canal is hardly differentiated from the aperture.

== Distribution ==
This species occurs in the Sea of Cortez, Mexico.
