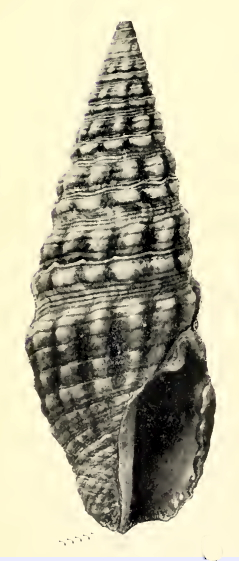
- Original image of a shell of Pilsbryspira arsinoe

Scientific classification
- Kingdom: Animalia
- Phylum: Mollusca
- Class: Gastropoda
- Subclass: Caenogastropoda
- Order: Neogastropoda
- Superfamily: Conoidea
- Family: Pseudomelatomidae
- Genus: Pilsbryspira
- Species: P. arsinoe

Binomial name
- Pilsbryspira arsinoe (Dall, 1919)

Synonyms
- Crassispira arsinoe Dall, 1919

= Pilsbryspira arsinoe =

Species of gastropod

Pilsbryspira arsinoe is a species of sea snail, a marine gastropod mollusk in the family Pseudomelatomidae, the turrids and allies.

== Description ==
The length of the shell attains 17 mm, its diameter 7.5 mm.

(Original description) The biconic, acute shell is dark brown with paler projections and a reddish brown protoconch of two smooth whorls. These are followed by nine subsequent whorls. The suture is closely appressed, obscure, somewhat undulated with two fine threads and a garland of elongated paler nodules between it and the constricted spirally grooved anal fasciole. The other spiral sculpture consists of on the body whorl sharp narrow channeled grooves with wider flattish interspaces, which cut the axial sculpture into nodules. There are half a dozen closer threads on the siphonal canal. There is apart from the fasciole no finer spiral striation such as is found in most of the species of the group. The axial sculpture consists of (on the body whorl about 14) feeble ribs beginning at the fasciole, obsolete on the base and only prominent as single, double, or triple nodules at the shoulder. There are four or five rather distant spiral rows of nodules between the shoulder and the siphonal canal. The incremental lines are very fine and sharp. The aperture is narrow. The anal sulcus is wide and shallow with a marked subsutural callus. The outer lip is thin sharp, smooth inside, with no very evident varix behind it. The throat is brownish. The inner lip and the columella show a smooth layer of enamel. The anterior edge is raised on the siphonal canal. The latter is short wide and hardly differentiated from the aperture.

== Distribution ==
This marine species occurs off the Baja California, Mexico.
