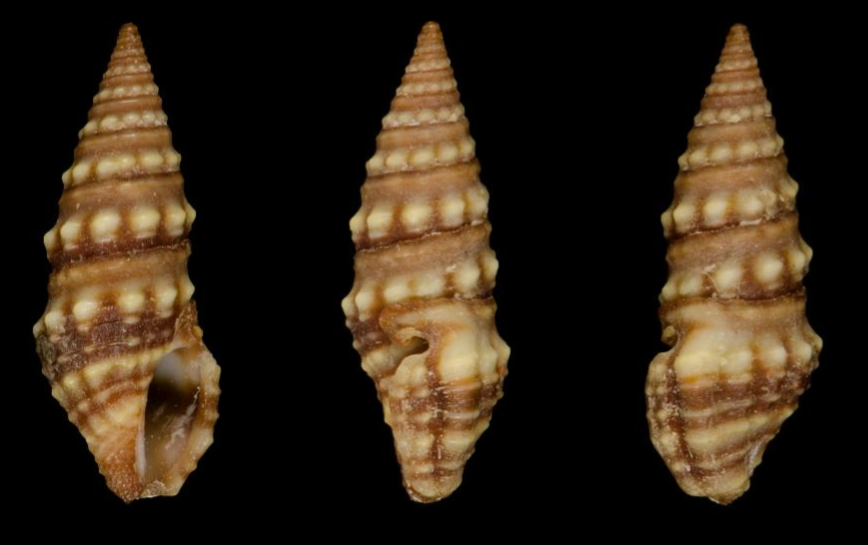
- Shell of Pilsbryspira monilis (holotype at the Smithsonian Institution)

Scientific classification
- Kingdom: Animalia
- Phylum: Mollusca
- Class: Gastropoda
- Subclass: Caenogastropoda
- Order: Neogastropoda
- Superfamily: Conoidea
- Family: Pseudomelatomidae
- Genus: Pilsbryspira
- Species: P. monilis

Binomial name
- Pilsbryspira monilis (Bartsch & Rehder, 1939)

Synonyms
- Crassispira monilis (Bartsch & Rehder, 1939); Monilispira monilis Bartsch & Rehder, 1939 (original combination)

= Pilsbryspira monilis =

Species of gastropod

Pilsbryspira monilis is a species of small sea snail, a marine gastropod mollusk in the family Pseudomelatomidae.

== Description ==
The length of the shell attains 12.5 mm.

== Distribution ==
P. monilis can be found off the North America coastline, ranging from Texas to Florida.
