= Splendrillia crassiplicata =

Scientific classification
- Kingdom: Animalia
- Phylum: Mollusca
- Class: Gastropoda
- Subclass: Caenogastropoda
- Order: Neogastropoda
- Superfamily: Conoidea
- Family: Drilliidae
- Genus: Splendrillia
- Species: S. crassiplicata

Binomial name
- Splendrillia crassiplicata (Kuroda, Habe & Oyama, 1971)

Synonyms
- Monilispira crassiplicata Kuroda, Habe & Oyama, 1971

Species of gastropod

Splendrillia crassiplicata is a species of sea snail, a marine gastropod mollusk in the family Drilliidae.

== Distribution ==
This marine species occurs off Japan.
