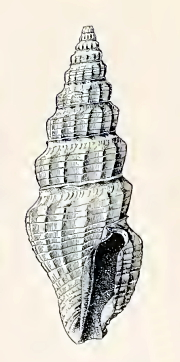
- Original image of a shell of Strictispira acurugata

Scientific classification
- Kingdom: Animalia
- Phylum: Mollusca
- Class: Gastropoda
- Subclass: Caenogastropoda
- Order: Neogastropoda
- Superfamily: Conoidea
- Family: Pseudomelatomidae
- Genus: Strictispira
- Species: S. acurugata

Binomial name
- Strictispira acurugata (W. H. Dall, 1890)

Synonyms
- † Drillia acurugata W. H. Dall, 1890 (original combination); † Pyrgospira acurugata W. H. Dall, 1890

= Strictispira acurugata =

Extinct species of gastropod

Strictispira acurugata is an extinct species of small sea snail, a marine gastropod mollusk in the family Pseudomelatomidae, the turrids and allies.

== Description ==
The length of the shell attains 21.2 mm, its diameter 8 mm.

(Original description) The strong shell contains nine or ten whorls beside the smooth protoconch. The spiral sculpture consists of fine scratches on the fasciole, sharp, usually paired, grooves on the body with wider and alternately broad and narrow rounded interspaces which are subnbdulous in the line of the transverse ribs. These nodulations are higher on the posterior margin of the interstitial bands, so that with the siphonal canal pointing vertically the base of the shell looks like a tiled roof on a cupola. There is a moderately elevated round thread in front of the suture and more or less undulated by the ends of the ribs behind it. On the siphonal fasciole there are a few fine threads. The transverse sculpture of (on the body whorl fifteen) moderately elevated ribs, beginning and strongest on the shoulder of the whorl and fading away anteriorly near the siphonal canal. On the base they are slightly nodulous between the spiral grooves. The anal fasciole is excavated but slightly undulate behind the ribs and marked by fine incremental lines. The notch is not deep but distinct and U-shaped. The siphonal canal is short and wide. The aperture is rather narrow, with a moderate callus on the pillar and no lirae on the outer lip.

== Distribution ==
Fossils of this species were found in Pleistocene strata in Florida, United States.
