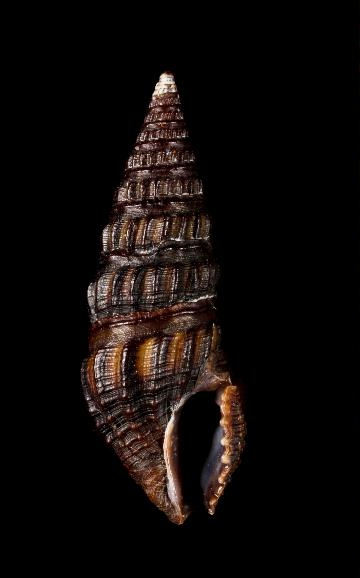
- Shell of Strictispira drangai (specimen at MNHN, Paris)

Scientific classification
- Kingdom: Animalia
- Phylum: Mollusca
- Class: Gastropoda
- Subclass: Caenogastropoda
- Order: Neogastropoda
- Superfamily: Conoidea
- Family: Pseudomelatomidae
- Genus: Strictispira
- Species: S. drangai

Binomial name
- Strictispira drangai (Schwengel, 1951)

Synonyms
- Crassispira drangai Schwengel, 1951; Crassispira (Crassispirella) drangai (Schwengel, 1951)

= Strictispira drangai =

Species of gastropod

Strictispira drangai is a species of small sea snail, a marine gastropod mollusk in the family Pseudomelatomidae.

== Description ==
The length of the shell varies between 14 mm and 20 mm.

== Distribution ==
This marine species occurs off West Florida, the Bahamas, the Greater Antilles, Saint Thomas, U.S. Virgin Islands and Barbados.
