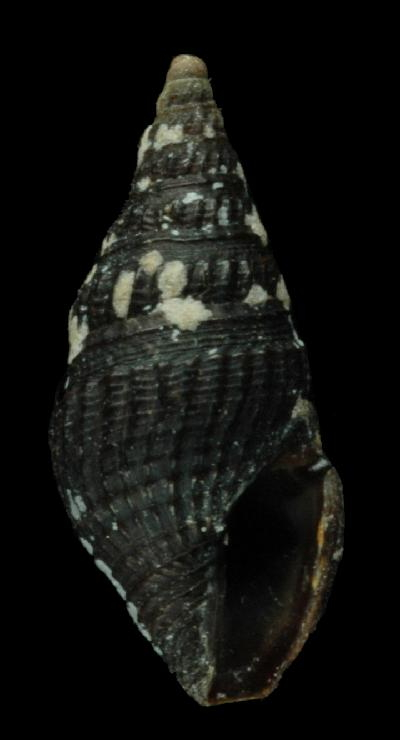
- Shell of Strictispira paxillus (specimen at MNHN, Paris)

Scientific classification
- Kingdom: Animalia
- Phylum: Mollusca
- Class: Gastropoda
- Subclass: Caenogastropoda
- Order: Neogastropoda
- Superfamily: Conoidea
- Family: Pseudomelatomidae
- Genus: Strictispira
- Species: S. paxillus

Binomial name
- Strictispira paxillus (Reeve, 1845)

Synonyms
- Crassispira paxillus (Reeve, 1845); Pleurotoma jamaicensis Guppy, R.J.L., 1866; Pleurotoma nigrescens Reeve, L.A., 1845 (Invalid: junior homonym [Nov. 1845] of Pleurotoma nigrescens C.B. Adams, 1845 [Jan.]); Pleurotoma paxillus Reeve, 1845

= Strictispira paxillus =

Species of gastropod

Strictispira paxillus is a species of small sea snail, a marine gastropod mollusk in the family Pseudomelatomidae.

== Description ==
The length of the shell varies between 8 mm and 18 mm.

The chocolate-brown shell is short and stout. The spire is acuminated at the apex. The whorls are concave round the top, with a small keel, very closely plicated in the middle. The interstices between the folds are finely striated. The shell is ridged round the base. The sinus is large.

== Distribution ==
S. paxillus can be found in Caribbean Sea waters, ranging from The Bahamas south to Brazil.
