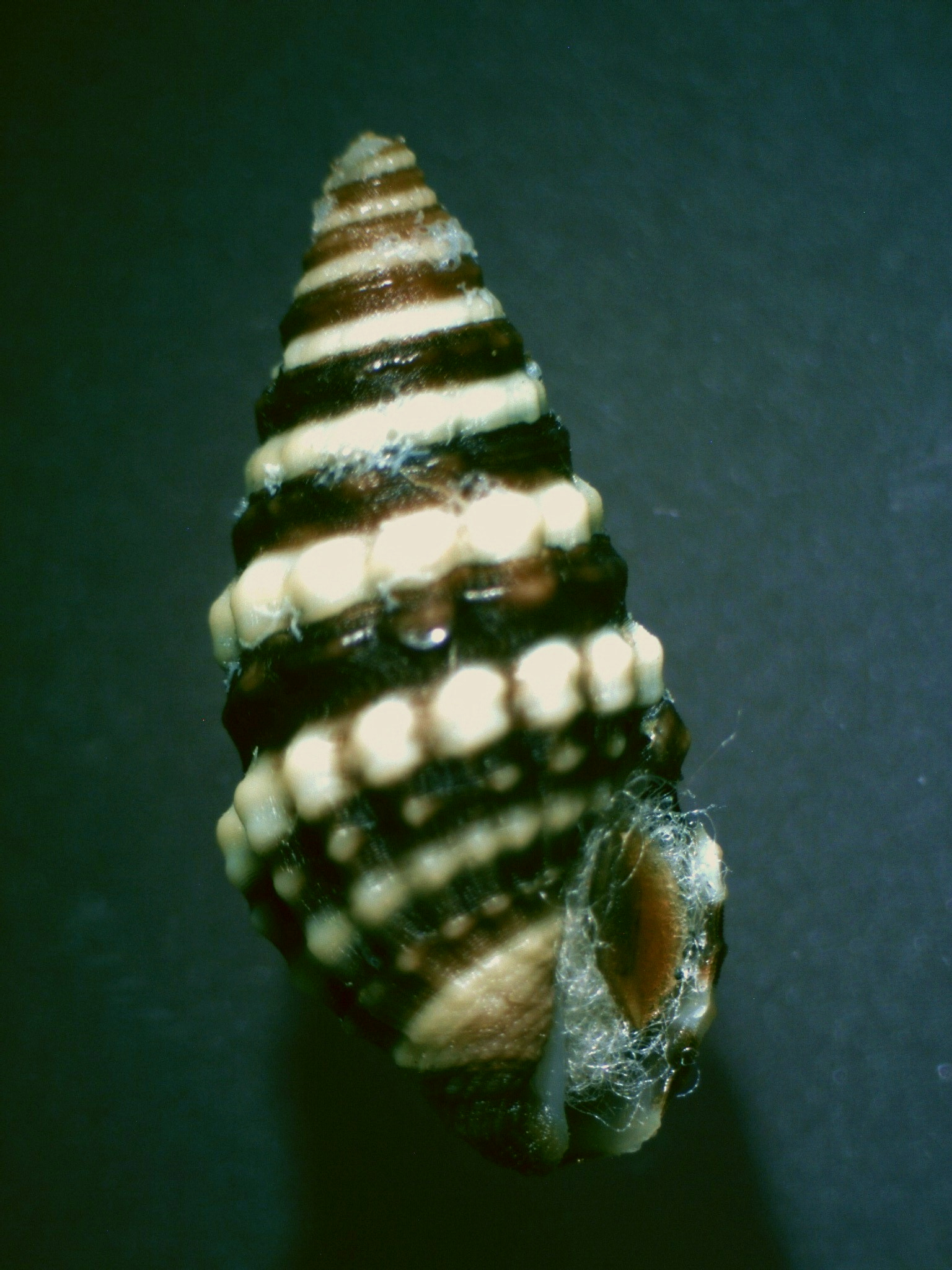
- Apertural view of a shell of Pilsbryspira nodata

Scientific classification
- Kingdom: Animalia
- Phylum: Mollusca
- Class: Gastropoda
- Subclass: Caenogastropoda
- Order: Neogastropoda
- Superfamily: Conoidea
- Family: Pseudomelatomidae
- Genus: Pilsbryspira
- Species: P. nodata

Binomial name
- Pilsbryspira nodata (C. B. Adams, 1850)

Synonyms
- Crassispira albomaculata (d'Orbigny, 1847); Crassispira pilsbryi Bartsch, 1950; Pilsbryspira albopustulata Smith, 1882; Pilsbryspira pilsbryi Bartsch, 1950; Pleurotoma albomaculata d'Orbigny, 1847 (non C. B. Adams, 1845)

= Pilsbryspira nodata =

Species of gastropod

Pilsbryspira nodata is a species of sea snail, a marine gastropod mollusk in the family Pseudomelatomidae, the turrids.

== Description ==
The length of the shell attains 13 mm.

== Distribution ==
P. nodata can be found in the Gulf of Mexico, ranging from the eastern coast of Florida to Venezuela.
