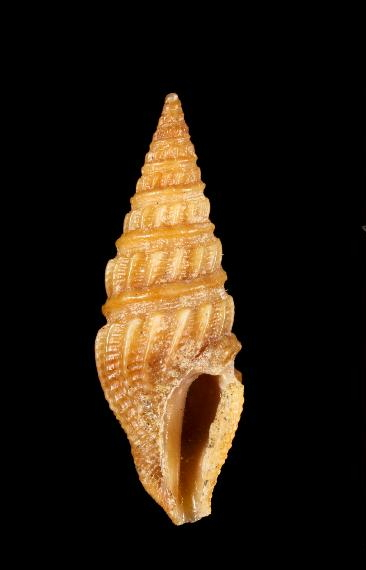
- Shell of Strictispira redferni (specimen at MNHN, Paris)

Scientific classification
- Kingdom: Animalia
- Phylum: Mollusca
- Class: Gastropoda
- Subclass: Caenogastropoda
- Order: Neogastropoda
- Superfamily: Conoidea
- Family: Pseudomelatomidae
- Genus: Strictispira
- Species: S. redferni

Binomial name
- Strictispira redferni Tippett, 2006

= Strictispira redferni =

Species of gastropod

Strictispira redferni is a species of small sea snail, a marine gastropod mollusk in the family Pseudomelatomidae.

== Description ==
The length of the shell attains 14.1 mm, its diameter 4.6 mm.

== Distribution ==
S. redferni can be found in Caribbean Sea waters, ranging from the Bahamas to Jamaica; also off French Guiana.
