= Strictispira stillmani =

Scientific classification
- Kingdom: Animalia
- Phylum: Mollusca
- Class: Gastropoda
- Subclass: Caenogastropoda
- Order: Neogastropoda
- Superfamily: Conoidea
- Family: Pseudomelatomidae
- Genus: Strictispira
- Species: S. stillmani

Binomial name
- Strictispira stillmani Shasky, 1971

Synonyms
- Crassispira stilmani Shasky, 1971

Species of gastropod

Strictispira stillmani is a species of small sea snail, a marine gastropod mollusk in the family Pseudomelatomidae, the turrids and allies.

== Description ==
The length of the shell attains 14 mm.

== Distribution ==
This marine species occurs off Pacific Ocean, Panama.
