= Cleospira ochsneri =

Scientific classification
- Kingdom: Animalia
- Phylum: Mollusca
- Class: Gastropoda
- Subclass: Caenogastropoda
- Order: Neogastropoda
- Superfamily: Conoidea
- Family: Pseudomelatomidae
- Genus: Cleospira
- Species: C. ochsneri

Binomial name
- Cleospira ochsneri (Hertlein & Strong, 1949)

Synonyms
- Cleospira bicolor (G. B. Sowerby I, 1834); Crassispira ochsneri (Hertlein & Strong, 1949); Monilispira ochsneri Hertlein & Strong, 1949; Pleurotoma bicolor G. B. Sowerby I, 1834 (invalid: junior homonym of Pleurotoma bicolor Risso, 1826; Monilispira ochsneri is a replacement name)

Species of gastropod

Cleospira ochsneri is a species of small predatory sea snail, a marine gastropod mollusk in the family Pseudomelatomidae.

== Description ==
The length of the shell attains 18 mm.

== Distribution ==
This species occurs in the Pacific Ocean off Panama to Ecuador; also off the Galapagos Islands.
