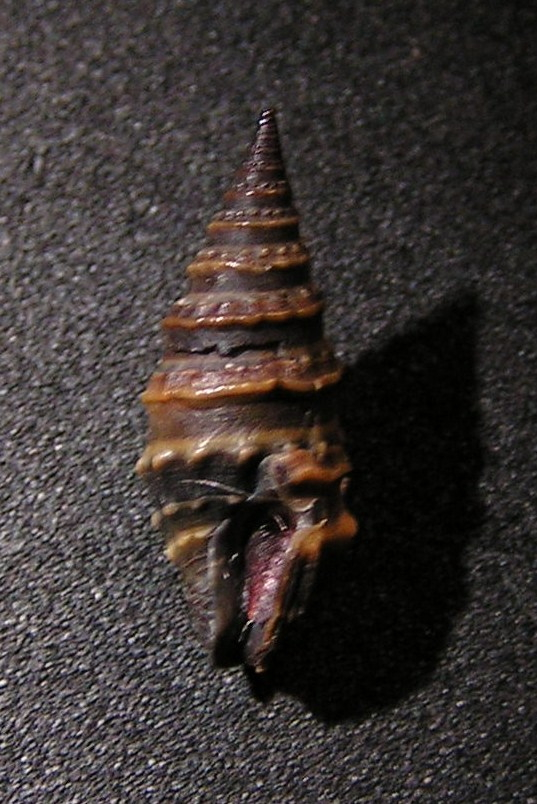
- Apertural view of a shell of Pilsbryspira aterrima

Scientific classification
- Kingdom: Animalia
- Phylum: Mollusca
- Class: Gastropoda
- Subclass: Caenogastropoda
- Order: Neogastropoda
- Superfamily: Conoidea
- Family: Pseudomelatomidae
- Genus: Pilsbryspira
- Species: P. aterrima

Binomial name
- Pilsbryspira aterrima (Sowerby I, 1834)

Synonyms
- Drillia aterrima (Sowerby I, 1834); Pilsbryspira atrior Adams, 1852; Pilsbryspira maura Kiener, 1840; Pilsbryspira rustica Carpenter, 1857; Pleurotoma aterrima Sowerby I, 1834

= Pilsbryspira aterrima =

Species of gastropod

Pilsbryspira aterrima is a species of sea snail, a marine gastropod mollusk in the family Pseudomelatomidae.

== Description ==
The length of the shell varies between 8 mm and 20 mm.

The shell has a very dark chocolate color, with sometimes a narrow white line above the periphery, but this is usually absent. The spire is lengthened or short. The whorls are rudely prominently keeled on the periphery, which is nodulous. Below the keel are a few raised revolving lines, occasionally broken up into granules.

The great variation in the proportions of this shell has caused a number of synonyms to be made.

== Distribution ==
This species occurs in the Pacific Ocean from Mazatlan, Mexico to Northern Peru
