= Strictispira coltrorum =

Scientific classification
- Kingdom: Animalia
- Phylum: Mollusca
- Class: Gastropoda
- Subclass: Caenogastropoda
- Order: Neogastropoda
- Superfamily: Conoidea
- Family: Pseudomelatomidae
- Genus: Strictispira
- Species: S. coltrorum

Binomial name
- Strictispira coltrorum Tippett, 2006

Species of gastropod

Strictispira coltrorum is a species of small sea snail, a marine gastropod mollusk in the family Pseudomelatomidae, the turrids and allies.

== Description ==
The length of the shell attains 10.9 mm, its diameter is 4 mm.

== Distribution ==
This species occurs in the Atlantic Ocean off Espírito Santo, Brazil.
