= Leo George Hertlein =

American paleontologist

Leo George Hertlein (1898 – 1972) was an American paleontologist and malacologist who studied the Recent and fossil mollusks of the eastern Pacific Ocean.

== Biography ==
Hertlein was born on a farm in Pratt County, Kansas. After graduating high school in Wichita, Kansas, he moved to the West Coast and entered the University of Oregon as a geology major.

After graduating with a B.A., Hertlein enrolled as a graduate student at Stanford University. He received his doctorate in 1929. His dissertation was on the Pliocene fossils of the San Diego, California area.

In 1929, Hertlein was appointed assistant curator of the Department of Paleontology at the California Academy of Sciences. He rose to become the curator of Invertebrate Paleontology and was elected a Fellow.

In the 1930s, he traveled to the Galapagos Islands and the nearshore areas of Central America and Mexico.

He published over 150 papers on Recent and fossil mollusks, echinoderms, and brachiopods from California, Oregon, Washington, and Mexico.

On many occasions, Hertlein worked with Ulysses S. Grant IV, who was a classmate at Stanford and who also worked on the fossil mollusks of California. They collaborated on several papers.

== Selected bibliography ==
- Grant, U. S., & Hertlein, L. G. (1938). The West American Cenozoic Echinoidea. University of California Press.
- Hertlein, L. G., & Grant, U. S., IV. (1944). The geology and paleontology of the marine Pliocene of San Diego, California. San Diego: San Diego Society of Natural History.
- Hertlein, L. G., & Grant, U. S. (1944). The Cenozoic Brachiopoda of western North America. University of California Press.
- Hertlein, L. G., & W. K. Emerson. (1953). Mollusks from Clipperton Island (Eastern Pacific) with the description of a new species of gastropod. Transactions of the San Diego Society of Natural History vol. 11, no. 13, pp. 345–364.
