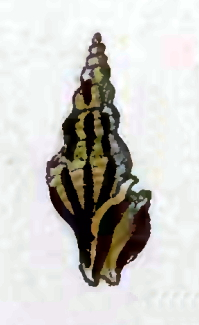
- Shell of Agathotoma neglecta

Scientific classification
- Kingdom: Animalia
- Phylum: Mollusca
- Class: Gastropoda
- Subclass: Caenogastropoda
- Order: Neogastropoda
- Superfamily: Conoidea
- Family: Mangeliidae
- Genus: Agathotoma; Cossmann, 1899

Type species
- † Raphitoma angusta Bellardi, 1847
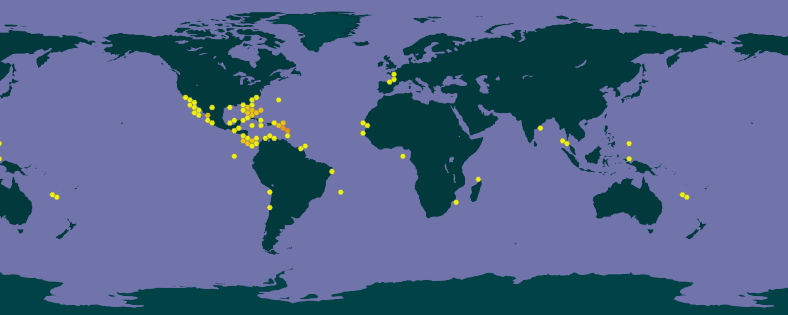

Synonyms
- Cytharella (Agathotoma) Cossmann, 1899; Agathothoma (wrong spelling); Ditoma Bellardi, 1875 (non Ditoma Illiger, 1807 (Coleoptera)); † Mangelia (Ditoma) Bellardi, 1877 (Invalid: junior homonym of Ditoma Illiger, 1807 [Coleoptera]; Agathotoma is a replacement name; † Mangilia (Agathotoma) Cossmann, 1899 (original rank)

= Agathotoma =

Genus of gastropods

Agathotoma is a genus of minute sea snails, marine gastropod mollusks or micromollusks in the family Mangeliidae.

== Description ==
Typical character of this genus: the spiral sculpture consists of fine, incised striae.

== Species ==
Species within the genus Agathotoma include:

- Agathotoma aculea (Dall, 1919)
- Agathotoma alcippe (Dall, 1918)
- † Agathotoma angusta (Bellardi, 1847)
- Agathotoma apocrypha (Garcia, 2008)
- Agathotoma asthenika Rolán, Fernández-Garcés & Redfern, 2012
- Agathotoma camarina (Dall, 1919)
- Agathotoma candidissima (C.B. Adams, 1845)
- Agathotoma castellata (E.A. Smith, 1888)
- Agathotoma coxi (Fargo, 1953)
- Agathotoma ecthymata García, 2008
- Agathotoma eduardoi Rolán, Fernández-Garcés & Redfern, 2012
- † Agathotoma estherae Landau, Harzhauser & Giannuzzi-Savelli, 2023
- Agathotoma finalis Rolan & Fernandes, 1992
- Agathotoma finitima (Pilsbry & Lowe, 1932)
- Agathotoma guadalupensis Espinosa & Ortea, 2017
- Agathotoma hilaira (Dall, 1919)
- Agathotoma kirshi Rolán, Fernández-Garcés & Redfern, 2012
- Agathotoma klasmidia Shasky, 1971
- Agathotoma legallae Fallon & Bouchet, 2026
- Agathotoma merlini (Dautzenberg, 1910)
- Agathotoma mighelsi (Kay, 1979)
- Agathotoma neglecta (Adams C. B., 1852)
- Agathotoma ordinaria (Smith, E.A., 1882)
- Agathotoma peggywilliamsae Fallon, 2026
- † Agathotoma pherousae (Glibert, 1960)
- Agathotoma phryne (Dall, 1919)
- Agathotoma prominens Rolán, Fernández-Garcés & Redfern, 2012
- † Agathotoma pseudolabratula Lozouet, 2015
- Agathotoma quadriseriata (Dall, 1919)
- Agathotoma secalis Shasky, 1971
- Agathotoma stellata (Mörch, 1860)
- † Agathotoma subfoliata (O. Boettger, 1902)
- Agathotoma subtilis (Watson, 1881)
- Agathotoma temporaria Rolan & Otero-Schmitt, 1999
- † Agathotoma vanualevensis Ladd, 1982

Species brought into synonymy

- Agathotoma badia (Reeve, 1846): synonym of Agathotoma candidissima (C. B. Adams, 1845)
- Agathotoma densestriata (C.B. Adams, 1850): synonym of Agathotoma candidissima (C. B. Adams, 1845)
- Agathotoma densilineata Dall W.H., 1921: synonym of Mangelia densilineata (Dall W.H., 1921)
- Agathotoma euryclea Dall, W.H., 1919: synonym of Agathotoma alcippe (Dall, 1918)
- Agathotoma metria (Dall, 1903): synonym of Vitricythara metria (Dall, 1903)
- Agathotoma pomara W.H. Dall, 1919: synonym of Mangelia pomara (W.H. Dall, 1919)
- Agathotoma pyrrhula Dall, W.H., 1919: synonym of Agathotoma alcippe (Dall, 1918)
- Agathotoma trilineata (C. B. Adams, 1845): synonym of Tenaturris trilineata (C. B. Adams, 1845)
