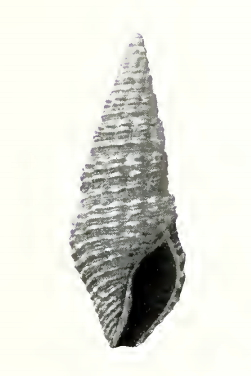
- Original image of a shell of Crassispira epicasta

Scientific classification
- Kingdom: Animalia
- Phylum: Mollusca
- Class: Gastropoda
- Subclass: Caenogastropoda
- Order: Neogastropoda
- Superfamily: Conoidea
- Family: Pseudomelatomidae
- Genus: Crassispira
- Species: C. epicasta

Binomial name
- Crassispira epicasta Dall, 1919

= Crassispira epicasta =

Species of gastropod

Crassispira epicasta is a species of sea snail, a marine gastropod mollusk in the family Pseudomelatomidae.

== Description ==
The length of the shell varies between 9 mm and 26 mm.

(Original description) The small shell is slender and acute. Its color is black or very dark reddish brown. It contains two smooth whorls in the protoconch, the second with a peripheral keel, followed by seven subsequent whorls. The suture is obscure, appressed, with a marked thread at its edge. The spiral sculpture consists of fine spiral striae over the entire shell, and (on the spire two or three, on the body whorl eight) stronger cords undulated but not nodulated where they pass over the axial sculpture, and separated by wider interspaces. The anal fasciole is hardly constricted. The axial sculpture consists of fine sharp incremental lines cutting the minor spirals and, on the body whorl about 13 low rounded ribs extending from the fasciole nearly to the siphonal canal but not conspicuous anywhere, with equal or narrower interspaces. The dark brown aperture is small. The anal sulcus is shallow and the thin outer lip is only moderately arcuate. The inner lip and the columella are simple. The siphonal canal is short, and hardly differentiated from the aperture.

== Distribution ==
This species occurs in Pacific Ocean from Acapulco, Mexico to Panama.
