= Mangelia rhabdea =

Scientific classification
- Kingdom: Animalia
- Phylum: Mollusca
- Class: Gastropoda
- Subclass: Caenogastropoda
- Order: Neogastropoda
- Superfamily: Conoidea
- Family: Mangeliidae
- Genus: Mangelia
- Species: M. rhabdea

Binomial name
- Mangelia rhabdea (W. H. Dall, 1927)

Synonyms
- Mangilia rhabdea W. H. Dall, 1927

Species of gastropod

Mangelia rhabdea is a species of sea snail, a marine gastropod mollusk in the family Mangeliidae.

== Description ==
The length of the shell attains 4.5 mm, its diameter 1.5 mm.

(Original description) The white shell has a smooth protoconch of about one whorl and three subsequent nearly cylindrical whorls. The suture is distinct, not appressed. The anal fasciole is faintly indicated;. The axial sculpture consists only of obscure incremental lines. The spiral sculpture consists on the body whorl only, of a faint suggestion of an angle at the shoulder. The aperture is narrow, about two-fifths as long as the shell. The outer lip is thin, protractively arcuate. The anal sulcus is wide and deep. The columella is straight. The siphonal canal is hardly differentiated.

== Distribution ==
This marine species was found off Fernandina, Florida, USA.
