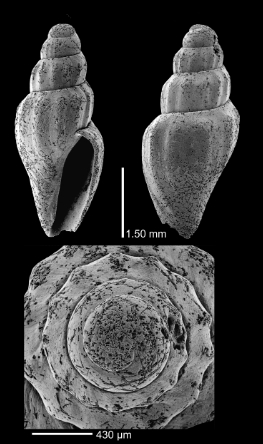
- Shell and protoconch of Mangelia loraeformis (syntype at the Smithsonian Institution)

Scientific classification
- Kingdom: Animalia
- Phylum: Mollusca
- Class: Gastropoda
- Subclass: Caenogastropoda
- Order: Neogastropoda
- Superfamily: Conoidea
- Family: Mangeliidae
- Genus: Mangelia
- Species: M. loraeformis

Binomial name
- Mangelia loraeformis (W. H. Dall, 1927)

Synonyms
- Mangilia loraeformis W.H. Dall, 1927

= Mangelia loraeformis =

Species of gastropod

Mangelia lastica is a species of sea snail, a marine gastropod mollusk in the family Mangeliidae.

== Description ==
The length of the shell attains 4.5 mm, its diameter 2 mm.

(Original description) The short, small, shell is polished, whitish and solid. It has a large protoconch of 1½ whorl and 3½ subsequent whorls. The suture is distinct, not appressed. The fasciole is inconspicuous. The whorls are moderately rounded. The aperture is about half the whole length. The axial sculpture consists of more or less obscure folds, stronger on the early whorls, seldom differentiated into distinct ribs, sometimes forming a rounded shoulder to the whorls. Beside these there are irregularly distributed incremental lines. There is no indication of any spiral sculpture. The aperture is narrow. The anal sulcus is hardly evident. The outer lip is straight, thin or very slightly thickened. The columella is straight, the axis not pervious.

== Distribution ==
This marine species was found off Fernandina, Florida, United States.
