= Agathotoma aculea =

Scientific classification
- Kingdom: Animalia
- Phylum: Mollusca
- Class: Gastropoda
- Subclass: Caenogastropoda
- Order: Neogastropoda
- Superfamily: Conoidea
- Family: Mangeliidae
- Genus: Agathotoma
- Species: A. aculea

Binomial name
- Agathotoma aculea (Dall W.H., 1919)

Synonyms
- Cytharella aculea Dall, 1919

Species of gastropod

Agathotoma aculea is a species of sea snail, a marine gastropod mollusk in the family Mangeliidae.

== Description ==
The length of the shell attains 6 mm, its diameter 2 mm.

(Original description) The small shell is purple-brown, banded with white, or varicolored. The protoconch consists of 1 1/2 loosely coiled, smooth whorls. The teleoconch comprises four additional whorls. The axial sculpture features six somewhat sigmoid, rounded, light-colored ribs that extend continuously up the spire. The interspaces between these ribs are excavated and much wider, with fine axial striation that slightly wrinkles the spirals. The spiral sculpture displays numerous sharp, often paired grooves separated by wider, flattened interspaces, faintly marked by axial striation. The aperture is narrow and accounts for about one-third of the shell's total length. The anal sulcus is conspicuous. The outer lip is thickened and smooth inside. The columella is simple, and the siphonal canal is barely differentiated.

== Distribution ==
This marine species was found off Cape San Lucas and Magdalena Bay, Baja California Sur, Mexico.
