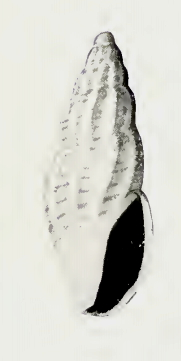
- Original image of a shell of Mangelia cesta

Scientific classification
- Kingdom: Animalia
- Phylum: Mollusca
- Class: Gastropoda
- Subclass: Caenogastropoda
- Order: Neogastropoda
- Superfamily: Conoidea
- Family: Mangeliidae
- Genus: Mangelia
- Species: M. cesta

Binomial name
- Mangelia cesta W.H. Dall, 1919

Synonyms
- Mangilia cesta W.H. Dall, 1919 (original description)

= Mangelia cesta =

Species of gastropod

Mangelia cesta is a species of sea snail, a marine gastropod mollusk in the family Mangeliidae.

== Description ==
The length of the shell attains 7 mm, its diameter 3 mm.

(Original description) The small shell is whitish polished, with (on the body whorl six or seven) widely spaced narrow brown spiral lines. It contains six whorls without the (lost) protoconch. The suture is distinct. The axial sculpture comprises ten rounded ribs extending across the whorl with subequal or wider interspaces. The ribs are not shouldered and start from the suture, which they undulate. The spiral sculpture consists of incised lines in the interspaces between the ribs. The brown color is situated in these grooves of which there are six or more on the body whorl, rather widely spaced;. The aperture is simple. The anal sulcus is inconspicuous. The siphonal canal is very short and wide.

== Distribution ==
This marine species occurs off San Pedro, California, USA.
