= Mangelia patagoniensis =

Scientific classification
- Kingdom: Animalia
- Phylum: Mollusca
- Class: Gastropoda
- Subclass: Caenogastropoda
- Order: Neogastropoda
- Superfamily: Conoidea
- Family: Mangeliidae
- Genus: Mangelia
- Species: M. patagoniensis

Binomial name
- Mangelia patagoniensis (W. H. Dall, 1919)

Synonyms
- Mangilia patagoniensis W. H. Dall, 1919 (original description)

Species of gastropod

Mangelia patagoniensis is a species of sea snail, a marine gastropod mollusk in the family Mangeliidae.

== Description ==
The length of the shell attains 5.5 mm, its diameter 3 mm.

(Original description) The minute, white shell has a blunt protoconch consisting 1½ whorls, followed by four subsequent whorls. The apex is bulbous. The suture is appressed and the fasciole is somewhat concave. The axial sculpture consists of (on the penultimate whorl about 18) short rounded obliquely protractive ribs with narrower interspaces extending from the succeeding suture to the anterior edge of the anal fasciole and across it as an arcuate thread to the preceding suture. These ribs become more or less obsolete on the body whorl and are feebly if at all produced beyond the periphery. The spiral sculpture between the fasciole and the succeeding suture consists of five cr six equal and equidistant strong threads with subequal interspaces on the penultimate whorl and about a dozen on the base of the body whorl, with smaller and closer ones on the siphonal canal. The angle at the anterior edge of the fasciole is prominent. The threads are hardly swollen when they pass over the ribs. The aperture is narrow, the anal sulcus is shallow and wide beginning at the suture. The outer lip is thin and, sharp The inner lip is erased. The columella and the siphonal canal are straight, the latter distinct but short and deep.

== Distribution ==
This marine species occurs off Western Patagonia
