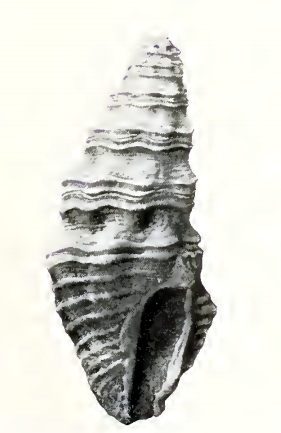
- Original image of a shell of Crassispira bridgesi

Scientific classification
- Kingdom: Animalia
- Phylum: Mollusca
- Class: Gastropoda
- Subclass: Caenogastropoda
- Order: Neogastropoda
- Superfamily: Conoidea
- Family: Pseudomelatomidae
- Genus: Crassispira
- Species: C. bridgesi

Binomial name
- Crassispira bridgesi Dall, 1919

= Crassispira bridgesi =

Species of gastropod

Crassispira bridgesi is a species of sea snail, a marine gastropod mollusk in the family Pseudomelatomidae.

== Description ==
The length of the shell attains 11 mm, its diameter 5 mm.

(Original description) The small shell is solid and grayish (this shell, being somewhat bleached, is probably of a darker color when fresh). It contains six whorls exclusive of the (lost) protoconch. The suture is strongly appressed, obscure with a thread-like edge in front of which is a narrow spirally striated space bordered in front by a larger cord forming the posterior margin of the anal fasciole. The fasciole is strongly constricted, undulated by the ribs and spirally striated. Other spiral sculpture consists of (on the upper whorls one, on the later two) peripheral cords which are swollen where they pass over the ribs and on the anterior of which the suture is laid. On the body whorl there are six such cords with much wider spirally striated interspaces, and about five closer threads on the siphonal canal . The axial sculpture consists of (on the body whorl six) strong rounded ribs almost continuous up the spire, most prominent at the periphery and feeble on the base. The aperture is narrow, with a varicose rib behind it. The anal sulcus is short, with a strong subsutural callus. The inner lip is erased. The columella shows a thin layer of callus, smooth, short, with a very short deep siphonal canal forming an evident siphonal fasciole.

== Distribution ==
This species occurs off Pacific Ocean, Panama.
