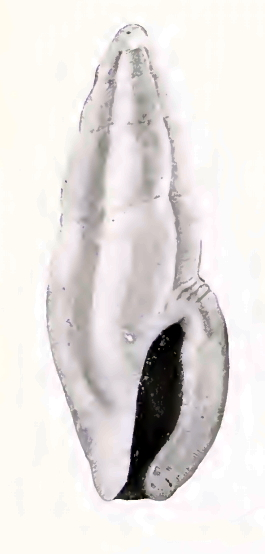
- Original image of a shell of Agathotoma camarina

Scientific classification
- Kingdom: Animalia
- Phylum: Mollusca
- Class: Gastropoda
- Subclass: Caenogastropoda
- Order: Neogastropoda
- Superfamily: Conoidea
- Family: Mangeliidae
- Genus: Agathotoma
- Species: A. camarina

Binomial name
- Agathotoma camarina (Dall W.H., 1919)

Synonyms
- Cytharella (Agathoma) camarina Dall, 1919

= Agathotoma camarina =

Species of gastropod

Agathotoma camarina is a species of sea snail, a marine gastropod mollusk in the family Mangeliidae.

== Description ==
The length of the shell attains 6 mm, its diameter 2.5 mm.

(Original description) The small, white shell has a hexagonal shape. The blunt, glassy protoconch consists of approximately 1 1/2 whorls. The teleoconch includes about five additional whorls.

Under a hand lens, the surface appears smooth, lacking visible spiral sculpture. The axial sculpture features six strong, rounded ribs that run the entire length of the shell and are continuous over the spire. The suture is distinct. The aperture is narrow with a relatively large, rounded anal sulcus. The outer lip is thickened and lacks internal liration. The inner lip is simple and not callous. The columella is short, and the siphonal canal is hardly differentiated.

== Distribution ==
This marine species occurs in the Pacific Ocean off the Galápagos Islands, Ecuador; also off Mexico and Panama.
