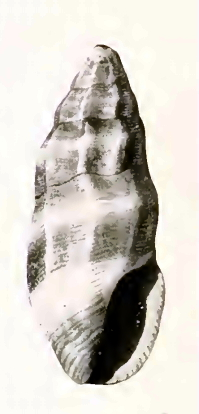
- Original image of a shell of Agathotoma quadriseriata

Scientific classification
- Kingdom: Animalia
- Phylum: Mollusca
- Class: Gastropoda
- Subclass: Caenogastropoda
- Order: Neogastropoda
- Superfamily: Conoidea
- Family: Mangeliidae
- Genus: Agathotoma
- Species: A. quadriseriata

Binomial name
- Agathotoma quadriseriata (Dall W.H., 1919)

Synonyms
- Cytharella quadriseriata Dall, 1919

= Agathotoma quadriseriata =

Species of gastropod

Agathotoma quadriseriata is a species of sea snail, a marine gastropod mollusk in the family Mangeliidae.

== Description ==
The height of the shell attains 5 mm, its diameter 2 mm.

(Original description) The small, stout shell is blunt and white, featuring a brown peripheral band and another band at the base. The protoconch is small and blunt, initially smooth and then spirally striated, comprising about 2 whorls, followed by five subsequent whorls in the teleoconch.

The axial sculpture includes eight rounded ribs, partly continuous up the spire, creating an undulating suture with subequal interspaces. Faint growth lines cross the transverse sculpture. The spiral ornamentation consists of almost microscopically fine threads uniformly spread over the shell, with wider flat interspaces.

The aperture is short and wide, lacking a differentiated siphonal canal. The anal sulcus is conspicuous. The outer lip is thickened and smooth inside.

== Distribution ==
This marine species occurs from the Gulf of California to Acapulco, Mexico; also in Costa Rica and Panama.
