= Mangelia christina =

Scientific classification
- Kingdom: Animalia
- Phylum: Mollusca
- Class: Gastropoda
- Subclass: Caenogastropoda
- Order: Neogastropoda
- Superfamily: Conoidea
- Family: Mangeliidae
- Genus: Mangelia
- Species: M. christina

Binomial name
- Mangelia christina (W. H. Dall, 1927)

Synonyms
- Mangilia christina W. H. Dall, 1927

Species of gastropod

Mangelia christina is a species of sea snail, a marine gastropod mollusk in the family Mangeliidae.

== Description ==
The length of the shell attains 6.5 mm, its diameter 2 mm.

The small, thin, slender shell is lucid white It shows a large swollen protoconch of 1½ whorl, followed by nearly four subsequent whorls. The suture is distinct, not appressed or marginated. The fasciole in front of it is obscure but gives rise to a distinct shoulder not far from the suture. The aperture measures about half the length of the shell. The whorls are flattish. The axial sculpture consists of (on the body whorl or a dozen) narrow, nearly straight ribs, with wider interspaces, obsolete on the base, but occasionally a little nodulous at the shoulder. The spiral sculpture is hardly discernable or none, even on the siphonal canal. The aperture is narrow. The anal sulcus is feeble. The siphonal canal is hardly differentiated. The outer lip is straight, thin and sharp. The columella is straight and attenuated in front. The axis is impervious.

== Distribution ==
This marine species was found in abundant numbers off Fernandina, Florida, USA.
