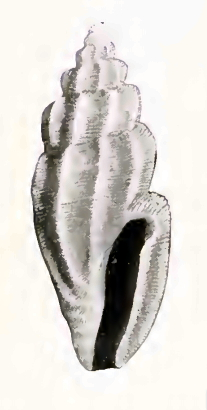
- Original image of a shell of Agathotoma alcippe

Scientific classification
- Kingdom: Animalia
- Phylum: Mollusca
- Class: Gastropoda
- Subclass: Caenogastropoda
- Order: Neogastropoda
- Superfamily: Conoidea
- Family: Mangeliidae
- Genus: Agathotoma
- Species: A. alcippe

Binomial name
- Agathotoma alcippe (Dall W.H., 1918)
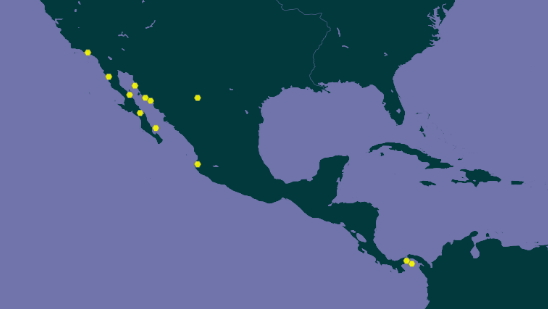

Synonyms
- Agathotoma euryclea Dall, W.H., 1919; Agathotoma pyrrhula Dall, W.H., 1919; Cytharella (Agathotoma) euryclea Dall, W.H., 1919; Mangilia parilis Smith, E.A., 1888; Pleurotoma alcippe Dall, 1918; Turris euryclea W.H. Dall, 1919

= Agathotoma alcippe =

Species of gastropod

Agathotoma alcippe is a species of sea snail, a marine gastropod mollusk in the family Mangeliidae.

== Description ==
The length of the shell varies between 5 mm and 11 mm.

(Original description) The minute shell, which is either whitish or pale brownish, is subcylindrical and turreted in shape. The protoconch features a projecting, minute subglobular apex and comprises about 1½ smooth whorls. This is followed in the teleoconch by approximately 4½ sculptured whorls.

The spiral sculpture consists of minute, close-set threads that uniformly cover the entire surface. The suture is distinct and appressed, with the whorls being shouldered immediately in front of it.

The axial sculpture is characterized by prominent, slightly protractively oblique ribs (seven or eight on the body whorl), with wider interspaces. These ribs extend over the entire whorl and are prominent at the shoulder, but they are not continuous over the spire.

The aperture is narrow, and the outer lip is varicose, thick, and striated in front while being smooth inside. The anal sulcus is conspicuous but not deep. The inner lip is smooth, and the siphonal canal is barely differentiated.

== Distribution ==
This marine species occurs off the Sea of Cortez, Western Mexico, and off Panama and the Galápagos Islands, Ecuador.
