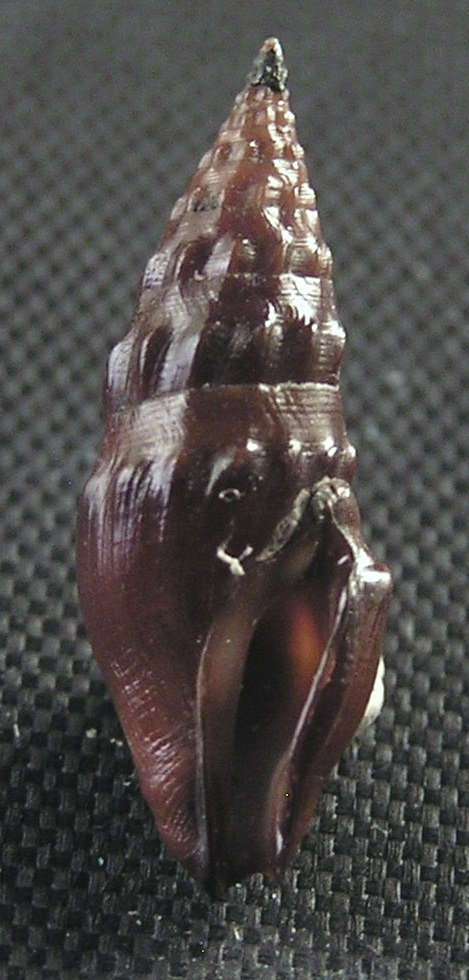
- Original image of a shell of Crassispira tepocana

Scientific classification
- Kingdom: Animalia
- Phylum: Mollusca
- Class: Gastropoda
- Subclass: Caenogastropoda
- Order: Neogastropoda
- Superfamily: Conoidea
- Family: Pseudomelatomidae
- Genus: Crassispira
- Species: C. tepocana

Binomial name
- Crassispira tepocana Dall, 1919

Synonyms
- Crassispira (Striospira) tepocana (Dall, 1919)

= Crassispira tepocana =

Species of gastropod

Crassispira tepocana is a species of sea snail, a marine gastropod mollusk in the family Pseudomelatomidae.

== Description ==
The length of the shell attains 19 mm, its diameter 8 mm.

(Original description) The solid shell is livid purple under a very dark olive periostracum. It consists of about six whorls exclusive of the (lost) protoconch. The suture is strongly appressed behind a constricted anal fasciole. The spiral sculpture consists of (on the penultimate whorl about nine) strong flattish threads, equal all over the surface and without intercalary striae. They have narrower interspaces on the spire and equal or wider ones on the body whorl. The axial sculpture consists of (on the body whorl about 10) sharp-edged narrow nearly straight ribs reaching nearly to the siphonal canal from the fasciole, with much wider interspaces. The narrow aperture is dark purple. The short anal sulcus is rounded and shows a strong subsutural callus. The outer lip is thin, slightly arcuate and smooth within, having a feeble varix behind it. The inner lip shows a thick layer of enamel, having a raised edge anteriorly. The short siphonal canal is hardly differentiated from the aperture. The siphonal sulcus is deep, forming an evident fasciole.

== Distribution ==
This species occurs in the Pacific Ocean from Sonora, Mexico to Panama.
