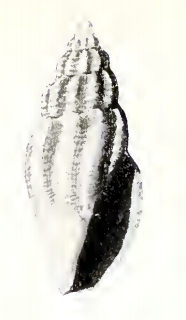
- Original image of a shell of Mangelia amatula

Scientific classification
- Kingdom: Animalia
- Phylum: Mollusca
- Class: Gastropoda
- Subclass: Caenogastropoda
- Order: Neogastropoda
- Superfamily: Conoidea
- Family: Mangeliidae
- Genus: Mangelia
- Species: M. amatula

Binomial name
- Mangelia amatula (W. H. Dall, 1919)

Synonyms
- Cytharella amatula W. H. Dall, 1919 (original description)

= Mangelia amatula =

Species of gastropod

Mangelia amatula is a species of sea snail, a marine gastropod mollusk in the family Mangeliidae.

== Description ==
The length of the shell attains 6.5 millimetres (0.26 in), its diameter 3 millimetres (0.12 in).

(Original description) The small shell is pale waxen yellow, with occasional brown spots between the ribs. It contains about 1½ smooth white whorls in the protoconch and about 5½ subsequent whorls. The axial sculpture consists of (on the body whorl eight) stout protractively arcuate ribs with subequal or narrower interspaces not continuous up the spire, but extending from the suture over a slight shoulder to the siphonal canal. The spiral sculpture consists of numerous fine sharp striae covering the shell (except on the anal fasciole) with flattish wider interspaces. There is a slight angle at the shoulder. The aperture is narrow. The outer lip is infolded. The anal sulcus is large. The siphonal canal is hardly differentiated. The columella is smooth.

== Distribution ==
This marine species occurs off California, found at San Diego.
