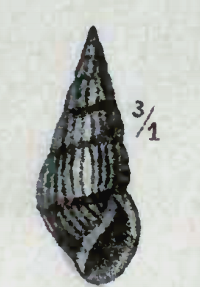
- Image of a shell of Clavus exilis

Scientific classification
- Kingdom: Animalia
- Phylum: Mollusca
- Class: Gastropoda
- Subclass: Caenogastropoda
- Order: Neogastropoda
- Superfamily: Conoidea
- Family: Drilliidae
- Genus: Clavus
- Species: C. exilis

Binomial name
- Clavus exilis (Pease, 1868)

Synonyms
- Drillia exilis Pease, 1868; Iredalea exilis (Pease, 1868)

= Clavus exilis =

Species of gastropod

Clavus exilis is a species of sea snail, a marine gastropod mollusk in the family Drilliidae.

== Description ==
The pupoid-claviform shell is small (8 mm or less). The 5½ teleoconch whorls are nearly plane and longitudinally plicately ribbed. The 15–22 axial ribs are small and close, descending from the sutures. The aperture is very short. The anal sulcus is moderately deep. The siphonal canal is short and open. The color of the shell is reddish chestnut, the ribs whitish, with a dark band below the middle of the body whorl.

== Distribution ==
This marine species occurs in the Indian Ocean off KwaZuluNatal, South Africa, and Mozambique; in the Pacific Ocean off Polynesia
