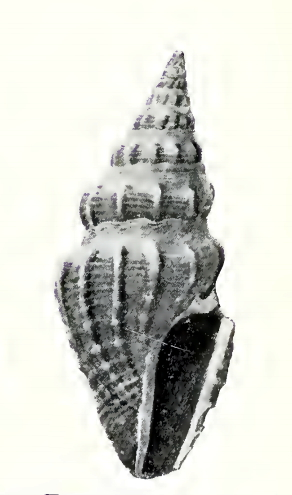
- Original image of a shell of Crassispira erigone

Scientific classification
- Kingdom: Animalia
- Phylum: Mollusca
- Class: Gastropoda
- Subclass: Caenogastropoda
- Order: Neogastropoda
- Superfamily: Conoidea
- Family: Pseudomelatomidae
- Genus: Crassispira
- Species: C. erigone

Binomial name
- Crassispira erigone Dall, 1919

Synonyms
- Dallspira erigone (Dall, 1919)

= Crassispira erigone =

Species of gastropod

Crassispira erigone is a species of sea snail, a marine gastropod mollusk in the family Pseudomelatomidae.

== Description ==
The length of the shell attains 20 mm, its diameter 9 mm.

(Original description) The solid, acute shell is biconic. Its color is olive brown with a purplish aperture. The protoconch contains two whorls, the first minute, smooth, rounded, the second with a peripheral keel. These are followed by eight sculptured whorls. The suture is appressed, obscure, behind a strongly constricted anal fasciole sculptured with almost microscopic spiral striae. The other spiral sculpture consists of small obsolete threads covering the whole surface in front of the fasciole and three or four cords on the base of the body whorl widely separated and conspicuously nodulous where they cross the ribs. There are also 10 or more closer cords on the siphonal canal. The axial sculpture consists of (on the spire about a dozen) short narrow ribs, very prominent and almost angular in front of the fasciole and on the body whorl extending nearly to the siphonal canal, with wider interspaces and not nodulous behind the base. The incremental lines are very fine and minutely crenulate the fine spiral sculpture in places. The aperture is narrow. The short anal sulcus is rounded, with a strong subsutural callus. The outer lip is thin, smooth inside, moderately arcuate, with a hump-like varix behind it. The inner lip and the straight columella are covered with a thin layer of enamel, raised anteriorly at the edge. The short siphonal canal is not deep and is hardly differentiated from the aperture.

== Distribution ==
This species occurs in the Pacific Ocean from Panama to Nicaragua.
