= Suturocythara =

Scientific classification
- Kingdom: Animalia
- Phylum: Mollusca
- Class: Gastropoda
- Subclass: Caenogastropoda
- Order: Neogastropoda
- Superfamily: Conoidea
- Family: Mangeliidae
- Genus: Suturocythara; Garcia, 2008

Type species
- Suturocythara redferni García, 2008

Species
- See text

Genus of gastropods

Suturocythara is a genus of sea snails, marine gastropod mollusks in the family Mangeliidae.

== Species ==
Species within the genus Suturocythara include:

- Suturocythara apocrypha E. F. García, 2008
- Suturocythara guadalupensis (Espinosa & Ortea, 2017)
- Suturocythara minima Fallon & Bouchet, 2026
- Suturocythara redferni García, 2008

Species brought into synonymy

- Suturocythara apocrypha Garcia, 2008: synonym of Agathotoma apocrypha (Garcia, 2008) (original combination)
