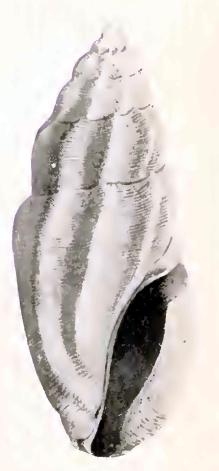
- Original image of a shell of Agathotoma phryne

Scientific classification
- Kingdom: Animalia
- Phylum: Mollusca
- Class: Gastropoda
- Subclass: Caenogastropoda
- Order: Neogastropoda
- Superfamily: Conoidea
- Family: Mangeliidae
- Genus: Agathotoma
- Species: A. phryne

Binomial name
- Agathotoma phryne (Dall W.H., 1919)

Synonyms
- Cytharella (Agathotoma) phryne Dall, 1919

= Agathotoma phryne =

Species of gastropod

Agathotoma phryne is a species of sea snail, a marine gastropod mollusk in the family Mangeliidae.

== Description ==
The length of the shell attains 6.2 mm, its diameter 2.5 mm.

(Original description)The small, fusiform, stout shell is whitish with three obscure pale brownish spiral bands on the body whorl. The protoconch is minute and translucent, containing about one whorl, followed by slightly over four whorls in the teleoconch. The suture is appressed and indistinct.

The spiral sculpture consists of numerous very fine, equal, and closely set threads that cover the entire surface. The axial sculpture features seven strong, rounded, somewhat sigmoid ribs that are slightly shouldered near the suture. These ribs are continuous up the spire and retract obliquely posteriorly, extending from the siphonal canal to the suture on the body whorl. There are no obvious incremental lines.

The apertureis narrow, with a shallow and rounded anal sulcus. The outer lip is broadly infolded and smooth on the inside. The inner lip is also smooth and not callous. The siphonal canal is barely differentiated.

== Distribution ==
This marine species occurs in the Pacific Ocean off Panama.
