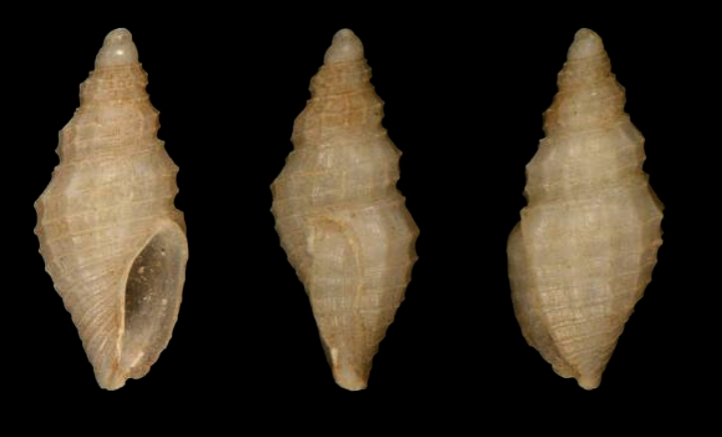
- Shell of Mangelia sagena (syntype at the Smithsonian Institution)

Scientific classification
- Kingdom: Animalia
- Phylum: Mollusca
- Class: Gastropoda
- Subclass: Caenogastropoda
- Order: Neogastropoda
- Superfamily: Conoidea
- Family: Mangeliidae
- Genus: Mangelia
- Species: M. sagena

Binomial name
- Mangelia sagena (W.H. Dall, 1927)

Synonyms
- Daphnella sagena Dall, 1927

= Mangelia sagena =

Species of gastropod

Mangelia sagena is a species of sea snail, a marine gastropod mollusk in the family Mangeliidae.

== Description ==
The length of the shell attains 5 mm, its diameter 2.2 mm.

(Original description) The small shell is vitreous white. It is few whorled, the body whorl much the largest. It contains a smooth protoconch of1½ whorl and somewhat more than 3½ subsequent whorls. The suture is inconspicuous, not constricted. The fasciole is feebly marked. The axial sculpture consists of (on the body whorl about a dozen) low rounded ribs with much wider interspaces, crossing the whorls, and well-marked close incremental lines. The spiral sculpture consists of (on the first adult whorl 2, on the next 3, and on the body whorl 8 or 9) sharp fine threads with much wider interspaces, a little swollen where they override the ribs, and forming by the intersection a rather open reticulum. In the interspaces are very fine close spiral striae. This sculpture covers the shell. The aperture is narrow, hardly wider than the siphonal canal. The anal sulcus is very shallow. The outer lip is hardly thickened. The columella is short and straight, axis impervious.

== Distribution ==
This marine species was found off Fernandina, Florida, USA at a depth of 805 m.
