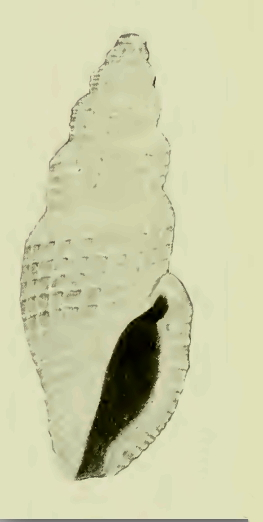
- Original image of a shell of Agathotoma hilaira

Scientific classification
- Kingdom: Animalia
- Phylum: Mollusca
- Class: Gastropoda
- Subclass: Caenogastropoda
- Order: Neogastropoda
- Superfamily: Conoidea
- Family: Mangeliidae
- Genus: Agathotoma
- Species: A. hilaira

Binomial name
- Agathotoma hilaira (Dall W.H., 1919)

Synonyms
- Philbertia hilaira Dall, 1919

= Agathotoma hilaira =

Species of gastropod

Agathotoma hilaira is a species of sea snail, a marine gastropod mollusk in the family Mangeliidae.

== Description ==
The length of the shell attains 6.5 mm, its diameter 2.5 mm.

(Original description) The small, elevated shell is translucent white. The protoconch comprises two or more smooth whorls, though it is defective in the specimen. The five subsequent whorls are reticulated, moderately rounded, and slightly shouldered. The suture is distinct and not appressed.

The spiral sculpture consists of four stronger threads on the penultimate whorl, with the posterior thread forming the shoulder. Between these stronger threads, finer intercalary threads fill the wider interspaces. On the base of the shell, the minor threads become more closely set and coarser.

The axial sculpture features fourteen or more low, thread-like ribs on the body whorl, which extend to the siphonal canal and are slightly sigmoid behind the shoulder. The aperture is narrow. The outer lip is varicose and smooth inside, though the spiral sculpture shining through the translucent shell gives the appearance of liration. The anal sulcus is wide and shallow. The siphonal canal is barely differentiated.

== Distribution ==
This species occurs in the Sea of Cortez, Western Mexico
