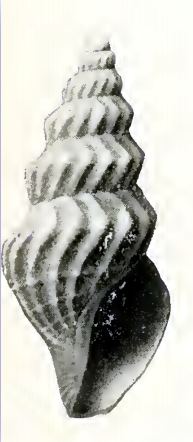
- Original image of a shell of Mangelia carlottae

Scientific classification
- Kingdom: Animalia
- Phylum: Mollusca
- Class: Gastropoda
- Subclass: Caenogastropoda
- Order: Neogastropoda
- Superfamily: Conoidea
- Family: Mangeliidae
- Genus: Mangelia
- Species: M. carlottae

Binomial name
- Mangelia carlottae (W.H. Dall, 1919)

Synonyms
- Mangilia carlottae W.H. Dall, 1919 (original description); Mangilia eriopis Dall, 1919 junior subjective synonym

= Mangelia carlottae =

Species of gastropod

Mangelia carlottae is a species of sea snail, a marine gastropod mollusk in the family Mangeliidae.

== Description ==
The length of the shell attains 9 mm, its diameter 4 mm.

(Original description) The small, thin shell is snow white. It contains a swollen smooth protoconch of two whorls and six subsequent whorls. The suture is distinct, not appressed. The anal fasciole slopes forward flatly to the shoulder of the whorl with only arcuate incremental lines for sculpture. The axial sculpture consists of (on the body whorl about 20) obliquely protractive short ribs, strongest at the shoulder and on the body whorl stopping abruptly near the periphery. The spiral sculpture is hardly perceptible, on the base of the shell there are a few distant obsolete threads and faint microscopic striae. These vary in strength in different specimens. The anal sulcus is rounded, wide and shallow. The outer lip is thin, sharp and arcuately produced. The aperture is narrowly ovate. The inner lip is erased. The columella and the siphonal canal are short, the latter wide and hardly differentiated.

== Distribution ==
This marine species occurs off Queen Charlotte Islands, British Columbia, Canada.
