= Mangelia subcircularis =

Scientific classification
- Kingdom: Animalia
- Phylum: Mollusca
- Class: Gastropoda
- Subclass: Caenogastropoda
- Order: Neogastropoda
- Superfamily: Conoidea
- Family: Mangeliidae
- Genus: Mangelia
- Species: M. subcircularis

Binomial name
- Mangelia subcircularis W.H. Dall, 1927

Synonyms
- Mangilia subcircularis Dall, 1927

Species of gastropod

Mangelia subcircularis is a species of sea snail, a marine gastropod mollusk in the family Mangeliidae.

== Description ==
The length of the shell attains 8 mm, its diameter 2.7 mm.

(Original description) The small, slender, thin shell has a blunt apex. It is whitish and glistening. It shows a swollen protoconch of 1½ whorl and 4½ subsequent well rounded whorls. The suture is distinct, appressed, with a smooth, hardly constricted fasciole in front of it. The axial sculpture consists chiefly of rather strong flexuous incremental lines and a few gradually obsolescent riblets on the earlier whorls. The spiral sculpture consists of (on the body whorl 18–20) fine prominent threads rising above the incremental lines, with wider interspaces, covering the whole whorl in front of the fasciole;. The aperture is ovate, measuring about⅓ the whole length. The anal sulcus forms nearly a semicircle. The outer lip is thin and arcuate. The siphonal canal is wide. The columella is twisted, attenuated in front; axis impervious.

== Distribution ==
This marine species was found off Georgia, USA.
