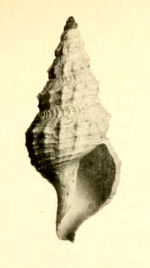
- Original image of a shell of Pleurotomella bureaui

Scientific classification
- Kingdom: Animalia
- Phylum: Mollusca
- Class: Gastropoda
- Subclass: Caenogastropoda
- Order: Neogastropoda
- Superfamily: Conoidea
- Family: Raphitomidae
- Genus: Pleurotomella
- Species: P. bureaui

Binomial name
- Pleurotomella bureaui (Dautzenberg & Fischer, 1897)

Synonyms
- Mangilia sericifila Dall, 1927; Pleurotoma bureaui Dautzenberg & Fischer, 1897(original combination); Pleurotomella (Azorita) bureaui Nordsieck, 1968; Pleurotoma (Pleurotomella) bureaui Dautzenberg, 1927

= Pleurotomella bureaui =

Species of sea snail

Pleurotomella bureaui is a species of sea snail, a marine gastropod mollusk in the family Raphitomidae.

== Description ==
The length of the shell attains 8.4 mm, its diameter 3.6 mm.

The minute shell has a pale buff color with a brown Sinusigera protoconch of three whorls and four subsequent well rounded whorls. The suture is appressed with a fine thread in front of it;.0 The anal sulcus is wide and shallow, leaving a wide fasciole, arcuately striated behind it. In front of the fasciole there is an obscure shoulder to the whorl. The axial sculpture consists of incremental lines, most conspicuous on the fasciole, and a double row of obscure undulations at the periphery, most marked on the earlier whorls. The spiral sculpture consists of 10 or 12 equal, small threads in front of the periphery with narrow interspaces. The base of the shell is evenly rounded. The siphonal canal is short and wide. The columella is straight, attenuated in front. The aperture is ovate. The outer lip is thin and arcuate.

== Distribution ==
This species occurs in the North Atlantic Ocean off Georgia, USA, and the Azores.
