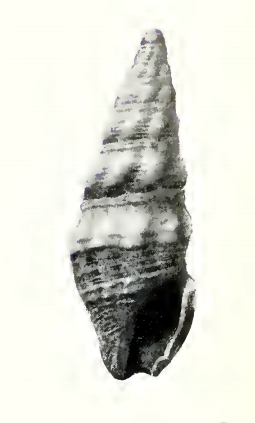
- Original image of a shell of Crassispira eurynome

Scientific classification
- Kingdom: Animalia
- Phylum: Mollusca
- Class: Gastropoda
- Subclass: Caenogastropoda
- Order: Neogastropoda
- Superfamily: Conoidea
- Family: Pseudomelatomidae
- Genus: Crassispira
- Species: C. eurynome

Binomial name
- Crassispira eurynome Dall, 1919

Synonyms
- Crassispira flavonodosa Pilsbry & H. N. Lowe, 1932; Crassispira (Dallspira) eurynome (Dall, 1919); Dallspira eurynome (Dall, 1919)

= Crassispira eurynome =

Species of gastropod

Crassispira eurynome is a species of sea snail, a marine gastropod mollusk in the family Pseudomelatomidae.

== Description ==
The length of the shell attains 11.2 mm, its diameter 5.2 mm.

(Original description) The small shell is slender and acute. It is dark brown with a whitish peripheral and a less obvious basal band. The blunt protoconch consists of two whorls. It is polished and reddish brown. It is followed by six subsequent whorls. The anal fasciole on the spire is depressed, very minutely spirally striated with a single fine thread near the posterior edge which is appressed at the suture. Other spiral sculpture consists of fine striae and three stronger threads with wider interspaces on the base. The siphonal canal has about half a dozen smaller closer threads. The axial sculpture consists of nine oval prominent nodules on the periphery, which may in some specimens be bisected by an incised spiral line. The incremental lines are not prominent. The aperture rs rather wide and short. The deep anal sulcus is deep, with a small subsutural callus. The outer lip is sharp edged, with a small varix, internally not lirate. The siphonal canal is short, wide, deep, with a perceptible siphonal fasciole and slightly recurved.

== Distribution ==
This species occurs in the Pacific Ocean from Acapulco, Mexico to Panama
