= Pleurotomella elusiva =

Scientific classification
- Kingdom: Animalia
- Phylum: Mollusca
- Class: Gastropoda
- Subclass: Caenogastropoda
- Order: Neogastropoda
- Superfamily: Conoidea
- Family: Raphitomidae
- Genus: Pleurotomella
- Species: P. elusiva

Binomial name
- Pleurotomella elusiva (Dall, 1881)

Synonyms
- Mangelia elusiva (Dall, 1881); Pleurotoma (Drillia) elusiva Dall, 1881 (original combination)

Species of gastropod

Pleurotomella elusiva is a species of sea snail, a marine gastropod mollusk in the family Raphitomidae.

== Description ==
The length of the shell attains 9.25 mm; its diameter 3.75 mm.

(Original description) The small, rather acute shell has a dull, ashy, worn appearance. The sculpture is faint, as if obsolete, although quite perfectly preserved. The shell contains eight or nine whorls. The protoconch contains two and a half whorls. These are yellowish, with their sculpture reticulated by raised revolving lines, and lines waved backward from before and behind a point on the periphery. The spiral sculpture of the remainder of the shell consists of twelve or (on the body whorl) fourteen rounded ribs, which start at the anterior border of the band. There are from three to six secondaries between the primary threads, and all, both secondaries and primaries, are ill defined and barely elevated above the surface. On the smaller whorls there are eight or ten transverse swellings extending from the edge of the notch-band to the suture, too wide and ill defined to call ribs, and chiefly evident as oblique waves most prominent at the anterior edge of the band. On the body whorl these are barely evident as ten or twelve faint nodules just before the band and wholly obsolete before the periphery. The whorl and the aperture taper imperceptibly into the short siphonal canal, with about seven spiral threads distinguishable as larger than the secondaries. The anal sulcus is moderate. The indistinct suture is appressed. The outer lip is thin, simple and moderately produced forward in the middle. The columella is short, twisted, with a thin white glaze on it. The siphonal canal is distinctly recurved.

== Distribution ==
P. elusiva can be found in Caribbean waters, ranging from the Yucatan to Puerto Rico.
