= Mangelia paulae =

Scientific classification
- Kingdom: Animalia
- Phylum: Mollusca
- Class: Gastropoda
- Subclass: Caenogastropoda
- Order: Neogastropoda
- Superfamily: Conoidea
- Family: Mangeliidae
- Genus: Mangelia
- Species: M. paulae

Binomial name
- Mangelia paulae O. Böttger, 1901

Synonyms
- † Cythara (Mangelia) paulae (Böttger, 1901); † Mangilia paulae O. Böttger, 1901 (uncertain > unassessed)

Extinct species of gastropod

Mangelia paulae is an extinct species of sea snail, a marine gastropod mollusk in the family Mangeliidae.

== Description ==
The shell reaches a height of 5 1/2 to 6 mm and a maximum diameter of 2 to 2 1/4 mm. The aperture measures 2 3/4 mm in height and 1 1/2 mm in width.

(Original description of Mangilia paulae in Latin) This species differs from my Mangilia subfoliata (synonym of † Agathotoma subfoliata (O. Boettger, 1902)) in that the shell is larger and distinctly more slender, with a spire that is less gradate and whorls that are more convex—being more rounded at the top and not at all subspinous.

The shell is small, slender, and fusiform, possessing a somewhat solid structure. The spire is turreted with slightly convex sides, and the apex is relatively acute. There are seven whorls that are only slightly convex, though they become more noticeably convex at the impressed suture. With the exception of the three smooth initial whorls, the shell is marked by ribs that are arranged almost vertically; on the body whorl, however, these ribs are more obliquely positioned. These ribs are subacute, moderately compressed, and few in number — there are ten on the penultimate whorl and eight to nine on the last —becoming even more sparse before the aperture. The interstices between them are smooth or marked only by a few very obsolete lirae.

The body whorl is slightly depressed and becomes lightly dilated at the aperture, though it is narrowed at the base; in height, it is equal to the spire. The aperture is narrow and broadly linear, featuring a very narrow and deep incision at the top. This incision is strongly recessed and suboval in shape, extending away from the threshold of the suture.

he aperture is separated from the suture by a tubercle-bearing ridge. The right margin is moderately protracted and is encircled on the exterior by a compressed rib that is slightly excavated on both sides, while the interior remains smooth. The columella is somewhat constricted and very slightly twisted, forming a distinct callus that is bordered by a small lip.

== Distribution ==
This extinct marine species was found in Middle Miocene strata in Poland and Romania.
