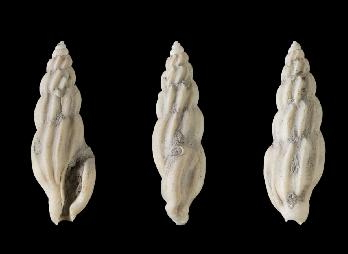
- Shell of † Agathoma angusta (specimen at MNHN, Paris)

Scientific classification
- Kingdom: Animalia
- Phylum: Mollusca
- Class: Gastropoda
- Subclass: Caenogastropoda
- Order: Neogastropoda
- Superfamily: Conoidea
- Family: Mangeliidae
- Genus: Agathotoma
- Species: A. angusta

Binomial name
- Agathotoma angusta (Jan in Bellardi, 1847)

Synonyms
- † Mangilia angusta (Jan in Bellardi, 1847); † Pleurotoma angusta Jan in Bellardi, 1847 (original description); † Raphitoma angusta Bellardi, 1847

= Agathotoma angusta =

Extinct species of gastropod

Agathotoma angusta is an extinct species of sea snail, a marine gastropod mollusk in the family Mangeliidae.

== Description ==
(Original description in Latin) The shell presents a somewhat spindle-shaped and narrow form with a smooth surface. It features elongated and flattened whorls, which are longitudinally ribbed. The ribs appear sharp, with interspaces that are smaller, somewhat oblique, and somewhat continuous, extending down to the siphonal canal on the body whorl. The siphonal canal is distinct, dilated, and recurved. The aperture is elongated, and its lips lie parallel. The outer lip is thickened and deeply fissured, exhibiting a somewhat sinuous shape anteriorly. The columella is smooth.

== Distribution ==
This extinct marine species has been found in Pliocene and Tertiary strata in Lombardy, Italy.
