= Agathotoma guadalupensis =

Scientific classification
- Kingdom: Animalia
- Phylum: Mollusca
- Class: Gastropoda
- Subclass: Caenogastropoda
- Order: Neogastropoda
- Superfamily: Conoidea
- Family: Mangeliidae
- Genus: Agathotoma
- Species: A. guadalupensis

Binomial name
- Agathotoma guadalupensis Espinosa & Ortea, 2017

Species of gastropod

Agathotoma guadalupensis is a species of sea snail, a marine gastropod mollusk in the family Mangeliidae.

== Distribution ==
This species occurs in the Caribbean Sea off Guadeloupe.
