= Agathotoma ordinaria =

Scientific classification
- Kingdom: Animalia
- Phylum: Mollusca
- Class: Gastropoda
- Subclass: Caenogastropoda
- Order: Neogastropoda
- Superfamily: Conoidea
- Family: Mangeliidae
- Genus: Agathotoma
- Species: A. ordinaria

Binomial name
- Agathotoma ordinaria (Smith, E.A., 1882)

Synonyms
- Mangelia ordinaria (E.A. Smith, 1882); Pleurotoma (Mangilia) ordinaria E.A. Smith, 1882 (original combination)

Species of gastropod

Agathotoma ordinaria is a species of sea snail, a marine gastropod mollusk in the family Mangeliidae.

== Description ==
The length of the shell attains 7.5 mm, its diameter 2.5 mm.

The turreted shell has an oblong shape and contains 7 whorls, with the first two being smooth and convex. The subsequent whorls are also convex and feature 10-11 ribs that subtly blend into the background and are adorned with spiral lirae. The aperture is narrow, measuring about 2/5 of the total length of the shell. The white outer lip is thickened (incrassate) and slightly sinuate at the top. The siphonal canal is short and narrow, while the columella is simple.

== Distribution ==
This species occurs in the Pacific Ocean from Peru to Northern Chile.
