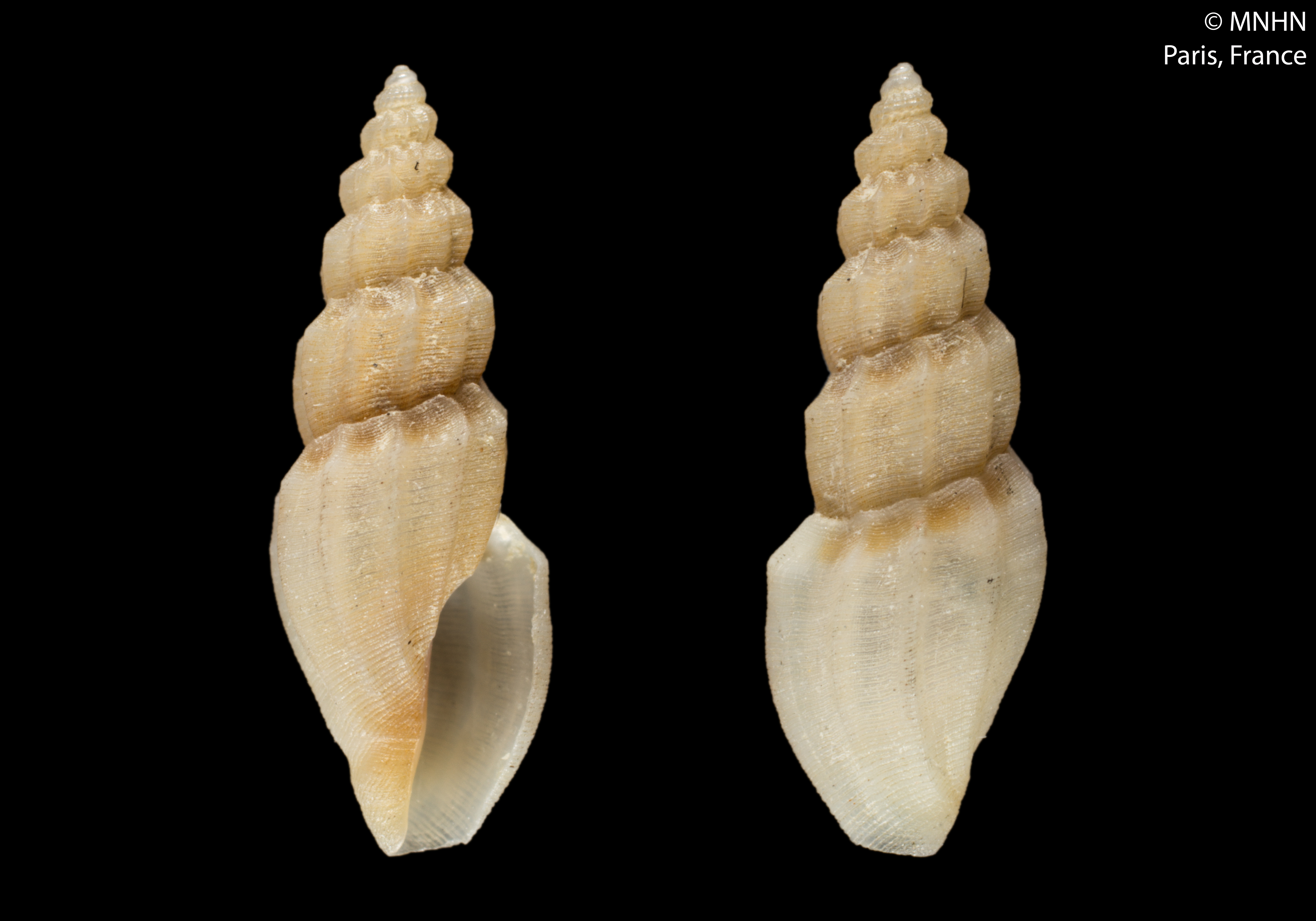
- Shell of Agathotoma merlini (syntype at MNHN? Paris)

Scientific classification
- Kingdom: Animalia
- Phylum: Mollusca
- Class: Gastropoda
- Subclass: Caenogastropoda
- Order: Neogastropoda
- Superfamily: Conoidea
- Family: Mangeliidae
- Genus: Agathotoma
- Species: A. merlini

Binomial name
- Agathotoma merlini (Ph. Dautzenberg, 1910)

Synonyms
- Cythara merlini (Dautzenberg, 1910); Mangilia merlini Dautzenberg, 1910

= Agathotoma merlini =

Species of gastropod

Agathotoma merlini is a species of sea snail, a marine gastropod mollusk in the family Mangeliidae. First described in 1910, its species name refers to Martial Henri Merlin, governor-general of French Congo.

== Description ==
The size of the shell varies between 5 mm and 8.5 mm; its diameter 3 mm.

The solid shell is very elongated with a fusiform-subcylindrical shape. The spireconsists of 8 whorls. The initial whorls are smooth and convex, while the remaining whorls are slightly convex. The suture is appressed. The shell's sculpture includes longitudinal ribs, which are narrower than their intervals, numbering 10 on the body whorl, with extremely fine striae visible only under magnification.

The aperture is narrow, constituting less than half the shell's total length. The columella is slightly excavated at the top and subtly twisted at the base. The outer lip is smooth on the inner side, featuring a sinus at the top and is inflected below the sinus.

The shell is primarily white with deciduous yellowish areas. The last three whorls exhibit a brown subsutural zone, interrupted by the lower extremities of the ribs, which remain white. The columella is tinged with dark brown.

== Distribution ==
It occurs on the westcoast of Africa (Mauritania and Senegal), and also on the islands of São Tomé and Príncipe.
