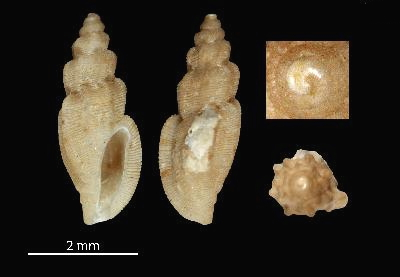
- Shells of Agathotoma asthenika (paratype at MNHN, Paris)

Scientific classification
- Kingdom: Animalia
- Phylum: Mollusca
- Class: Gastropoda
- Subclass: Caenogastropoda
- Order: Neogastropoda
- Superfamily: Conoidea
- Family: Mangeliidae
- Genus: Agathotoma
- Species: A. asthenika

Binomial name
- Agathotoma asthenika Rolán, Fernández-Garcés & Redfern, 2012

= Agathotoma asthenika =

Species of gastropod

Agathotoma asthenika is a species of sea snail, a marine gastropod mollusc in the family Mangeliidae.

== Distribution ==
This species occurs in the Gulf of Mexico off Florida, United States and in the Caribbean Sea off Cuba and Guadeloupe.
