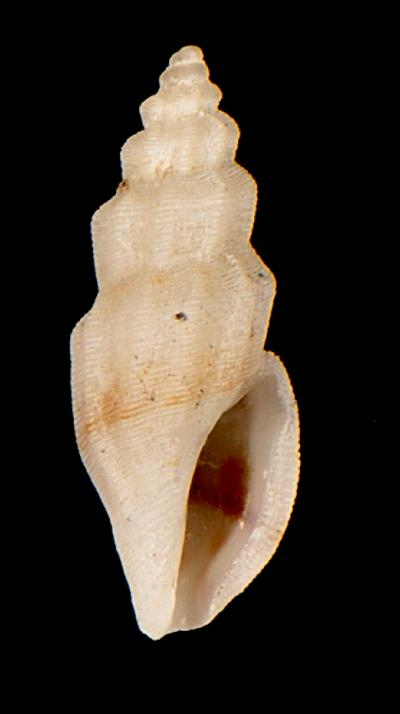
- Shell of Agathotoma ecthymata (specimen at MNHN, Paris)

Scientific classification
- Kingdom: Animalia
- Phylum: Mollusca
- Class: Gastropoda
- Subclass: Caenogastropoda
- Order: Neogastropoda
- Superfamily: Conoidea
- Family: Mangeliidae
- Genus: Agathotoma
- Species: A. ecthymata

Binomial name
- Agathotoma ecthymata García, 2008

= Agathotoma ecthymata =

Species of gastropod

Agathotoma ecthymata is a species of sea snail, a marine gastropod mollusc in the family Mangeliidae.

== Distribution ==
This species occurs in the Caribbean Sea off Martinique and Sint Maarten; in the Atlantic Ocean off the Bahamas.
