= Mangelia pomara =

Scientific classification
- Kingdom: Animalia
- Phylum: Mollusca
- Class: Gastropoda
- Subclass: Caenogastropoda
- Order: Neogastropoda
- Superfamily: Conoidea
- Family: Mangeliidae
- Genus: Mangelia
- Species: M. pomara

Binomial name
- Mangelia pomara (W. H. Dall, 1919)

Synonyms
- Agathotoma pomara W. H. Dall, 1919 (original description)

Species of gastropod

Mangelia pomara is a species of sea snail, a marine gastropod mollusk in the family Mangeliidae.

== Description ==
The length of the shell attains 7 mm, its diameter 3 mm.

(Original description) The small, solid and discolored shell has a fusiform shape. It contains six moderately convex whorls. The protoconch is small, subglobular and smooth (slightly decorticated). The axial sculpture consists of (on the penultimate whorl 11, on the body whorl 9) promment, slightly shouldered ribs with wider interspaces. The ribs undulate the appressed suture. The spiral sculpture consists of close-set alternated threads over the whole surface except between the shoulder and the suture, which is arcuately striated by the incremental lines. The aperture is narrow and straight. The anal sulcus is moderate. The outer lip is thickened and simple. The inner lip shows a wash of enamel. The siphonal canal is hardly differentiated.

== Distribution ==
This marine species occurs off San Pedro, California, United States.
