= Agathotoma klasmidia =

Scientific classification
- Kingdom: Animalia
- Phylum: Mollusca
- Class: Gastropoda
- Subclass: Caenogastropoda
- Order: Neogastropoda
- Superfamily: Conoidea
- Family: Mangeliidae
- Genus: Agathotoma
- Species: A. klasmidia

Binomial name
- Agathotoma klasmidia Shasky, 1971

Synonyms
- Pyrgocythara klasmidia (Shasky, 1971); Vitricythara secalis Shasky, D.R., 1971

Species of gastropod

Agathotoma klasmidia is a species of sea snail, a marine gastropod mollusk in the family Mangeliidae.

== Distribution ==
This species occurs in the Pacific Ocean off Mexico.
