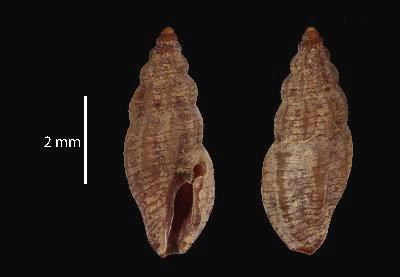
- Shells of Agathotoma finalis (paratype in MNHN, Paris)

Scientific classification
- Kingdom: Animalia
- Phylum: Mollusca
- Class: Gastropoda
- Subclass: Caenogastropoda
- Order: Neogastropoda
- Superfamily: Conoidea
- Family: Mangeliidae
- Genus: Agathotoma
- Species: A. finalis

Binomial name
- Agathotoma finalis Rolan & Fernandes, 1992

= Agathotoma finalis =

Species of gastropod

Agathotoma finalis is a species of sea snail, a marine gastropod mollusk in the family Mangeliidae. It was first described in 1992.

== Description ==
The height of the shell attains 3 mm.

== Distribution ==
This marine species is endemic to São Tomé and Príncipe.
