= Agathotoma finitima =

Scientific classification
- Kingdom: Animalia
- Phylum: Mollusca
- Class: Gastropoda
- Subclass: Caenogastropoda
- Order: Neogastropoda
- Superfamily: Conoidea
- Family: Mangeliidae
- Genus: Agathotoma
- Species: A. finitima

Binomial name
- Agathotoma finitima (Pilsbry & Lowe, 1932)

Synonyms
- Cytharella finitima Pilsbry & Lowe, 1932

Species of gastropod

Agathotoma finitima is a species of sea snail, a marine gastropod mollusk in the family Mangeliidae.

== Description ==
The length of the shell attains 6 mm, its diameter 2.3 mm.

== Distribution ==
This species occurs in the Pacific Ocean from Nicaragua to Peru.
