= Agathotoma estherae =

Scientific classification
- Kingdom: Animalia
- Phylum: Mollusca
- Class: Gastropoda
- Subclass: Caenogastropoda
- Order: Neogastropoda
- Superfamily: Conoidea
- Family: Mangeliidae
- Genus: Agathotoma
- Species: †A. estherae

Binomial name
- †Agathotoma estherae Landau, Harzhauser & Giannuzzi-Savelli, 2023

Extinct species of gastropod

Agathotoma estherae is an extinct species of sea snail, a marine gastropod mollusk in the family Mangeliidae.

== Description ==
The height of the shell attains 4.7 mm (0.19 in), its diameter 1.7 mm (0.067 in).

== Distribution ==
This extinct marine species has been found in Upper Pliocene strata in Estepona, southern Spain.
