= Agathotoma temporaria =

Scientific classification
- Kingdom: Animalia
- Phylum: Mollusca
- Class: Gastropoda
- Subclass: Caenogastropoda
- Order: Neogastropoda
- Superfamily: Conoidea
- Family: Mangeliidae
- Genus: Agathotoma
- Species: A. temporaria

Binomial name
- Agathotoma temporaria Rolan & Otero-Schmitt, 1999

Species of gastropod

Agathotoma temporaria is a species of sea snail, a marine gastropod mollusk in the family Mangeliidae.

== Description ==
The length of the shell attains 4.4 mm.

== Distribution ==
This species occurs in the Atlantic Ocean off Angola.
