= Agathotoma coxi =

Scientific classification
- Kingdom: Animalia
- Phylum: Mollusca
- Class: Gastropoda
- Subclass: Caenogastropoda
- Order: Neogastropoda
- Superfamily: Conoidea
- Family: Mangeliidae
- Genus: Agathotoma
- Species: A. coxi

Binomial name
- Agathotoma coxi (Fargo, 1953)

Synonyms
- Pyrgocythara coxi Fargo, 1953 (original combination)

Species of gastropod

Agathotoma coxi is a species of sea snail, a marine gastropod mollusk in the family Mangeliidae.

== Distribution ==
This species occurs in the Caribbean Sea off Florida, United States and Puerto Rico.
