= Suturocythara redferni =

Scientific classification
- Kingdom: Animalia
- Phylum: Mollusca
- Class: Gastropoda
- Subclass: Caenogastropoda
- Order: Neogastropoda
- Superfamily: Conoidea
- Family: Mangeliidae
- Genus: Suturocythara
- Species: S. redferni

Binomial name
- Suturocythara redferni García, 2008

Species of gastropod

Suturocythara redferni is a species of sea snail, a marine gastropod mollusk in the family Mangeliidae.

== Distribution ==
This marine species occurs off Georgia, USA
