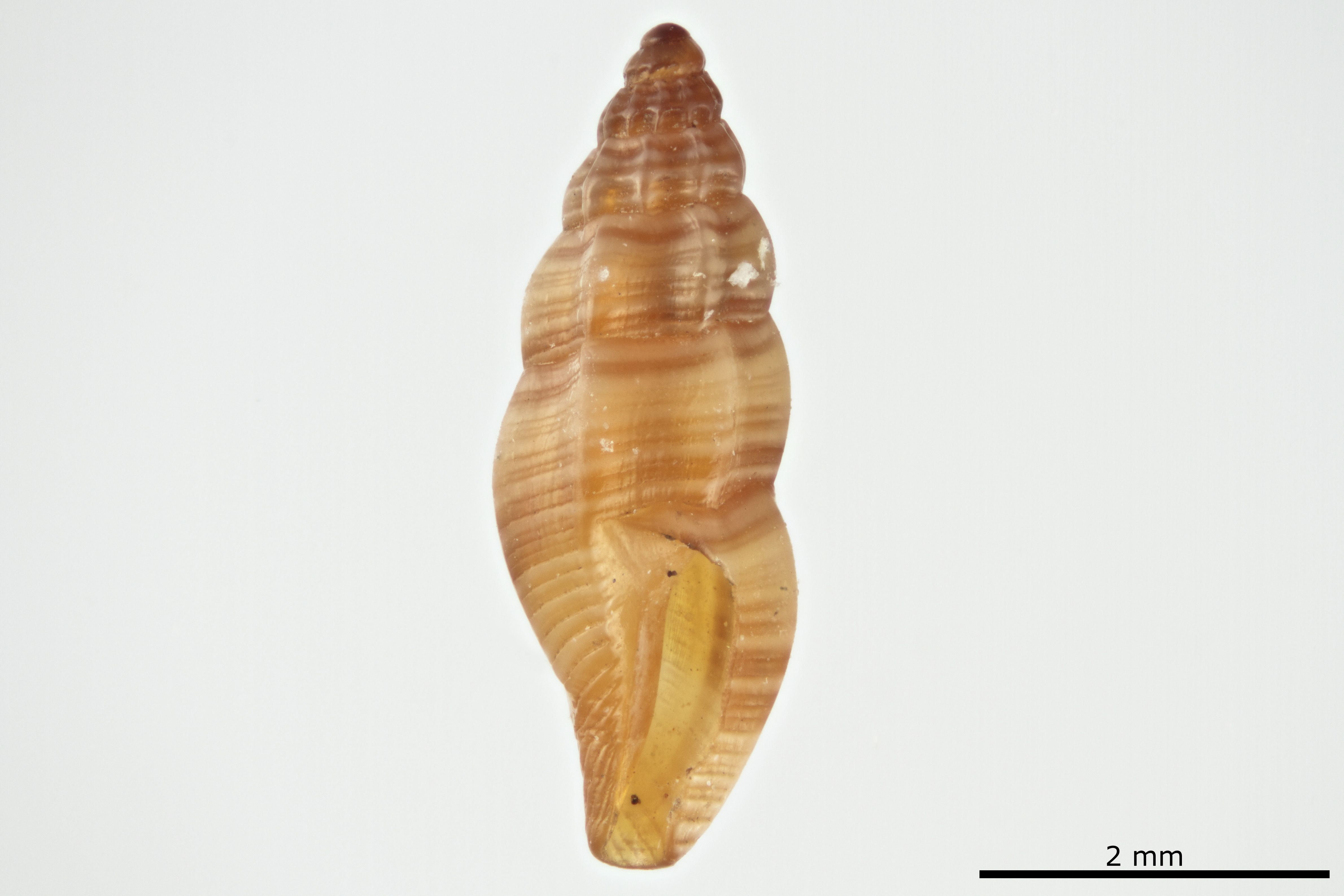
- Shell of Agathotoma stellata (specimen at the Natural History Museum Denmark)

Scientific classification
- Kingdom: Animalia
- Phylum: Mollusca
- Class: Gastropoda
- Subclass: Caenogastropoda
- Order: Neogastropoda
- Superfamily: Conoidea
- Family: Mangeliidae
- Genus: Agathotoma
- Species: A. stellata

Binomial name
- Agathotoma stellata (Mörch, 1860)

Synonyms
- Pleurotoma (Mangelia) stellata Moerch, 1860; Stellatoma hippolita W.H. Dall, 1919; Stellatoma taeniornata H.A. Pilsbry & H.N. Lowe, 1932

= Agathotoma stellata =

Species of gastropod

Agathotoma stellata is a species of sea snail, a marine gastropod mollusk in the family Mangeliidae.

== Description ==
The length of the shell attains 6 mm, its diameter 2 mm.

(Original description in Latin) The orange shell is elongated with a spire that surpasses the aperture. The surface is finely striated spirally and ribbed longitudinally, with 6-7 continuous, compressed, arched, and sharp ribs on the body whorl. These ribs are transparent and create hollow spaces. The outer lip is thickened and externally flat, with a posterior section that is thickened and sinuous. The columella is covered with a fine callus.

== Distribution ==
This marine species occurs from Baja Californica, Mexico, to Nicaragua and Panama and further south to Peru.
