= Agathotoma pherousae =

Scientific classification
- Kingdom: Animalia
- Phylum: Mollusca
- Class: Gastropoda
- Subclass: Caenogastropoda
- Order: Neogastropoda
- Superfamily: Conoidea
- Family: Mangeliidae
- Genus: Agathotoma
- Species: A. pherousae

Binomial name
- Agathotoma pherousae Glibert, 1960)

Synonyms
- † Mangilia (Agathotoma) pherousae Glibert, 1960 (basionym)

Extinct species of gastropod

Agathotoma pherousae is an extinct species of sea snail, a marine gastropod mollusk in the family Mangeliidae.

== Distribution ==
This extinct marine species has been found in Cenozoic strata in northwestern France.
