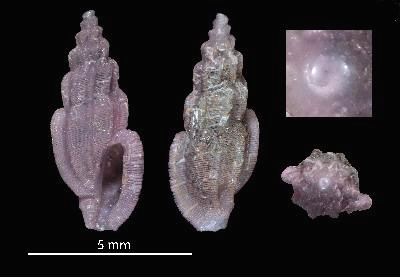
- Shells of Agathotoma kirshi (paratype in the MNHN, Paris)

Scientific classification
- Kingdom: Animalia
- Phylum: Mollusca
- Class: Gastropoda
- Subclass: Caenogastropoda
- Order: Neogastropoda
- Superfamily: Conoidea
- Family: Mangeliidae
- Genus: Agathotoma
- Species: A. kirshi

Binomial name
- Agathotoma kirshi Rolán, Fernández-Garcés & Redfern, 2012

= Agathotoma kirshi =

Species of sea snail

Agathotoma kirshi is a species of sea snail, a marine gastropod mollusc in the family Mangeliidae. It was first described in 1992.

== Description ==
The length of the shell attains 9 mm. the shell is white in color, with two isolated brown spiral bands visible on the shell ribs. The shell is made rough by many rugose cordlets made up of small nodules.

== Distribution ==
This species occurs in the Caribbean Sea and off the Bahamas and Turks and Caicos Islands.
