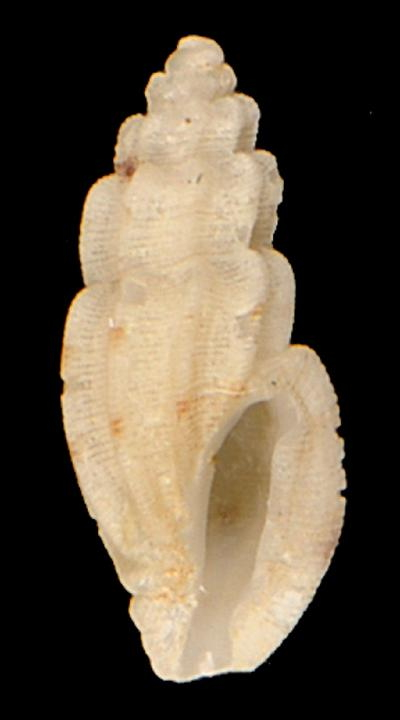
- Shell of Agathotoma candidissima (specimen at MNHN, Paris)

Scientific classification
- Kingdom: Animalia
- Phylum: Mollusca
- Class: Gastropoda
- Subclass: Caenogastropoda
- Order: Neogastropoda
- Superfamily: Conoidea
- Family: Mangeliidae
- Genus: Agathotoma
- Species: A. candidissima

Binomial name
- Agathotoma candidissima (C.B. Adams, 1845)

Synonyms
- Agathotoma badia (Reeve, 1846); Agathotoma densestriata (C. B. Adams, 1850); Lachesis candidissima (C.B. Adams, 1845); Mangelia badia Reeve, 1846; Mangelia hornbeckii Reeve, 1846; Mangelia densestriata C. B. Adams, 1850; Pleurotoma badia Reeve, 1846; Pleurotoma candidissima Adams C. B., 1845 (basionym); Pleurotoma hexagona Pfeiffer, 1840; Pleurotoma (Mangilia) millestriata E. A. Smith, 1882; Pyrgocythara candidissima (Adams C. B., 1845)

= Agathotoma candidissima =

Species of gastropod

Agathotoma candidissima, common name Cox's mangelia, is a species of sea snail, a marine gastropod mollusc in the family Mangeliidae.

== Description ==
The length of the shell varies between 4 mm and 11 mm.

The white, oblong, turreted shell features 7 to 8 whorls, with the protoconch missing in the specimen described. The axial sculpture comprises 7 to 8 ribs, with a distinctive characteristic where some ribs on the body whorl turn abruptly at right angles towards the base of the columella. This feature is especially noticeable on the penultimate and the three or four preceding ribs. Near the top, just below the suture, the ribs are faintly angled. Additionally, faint dots appear on the base in the upper whorls and on the middle and lower parts of the body whorl, which may be easily overlooked. A few faint dots are also present between the ribs, just below the suture.

The aperture is elongate-ovate, accounting for approximately 3/7 of the shell's total length. The outer lip is thickened and slightly insinuate at the top. The siphonal canal is short, and the base of the shell is truncated.

== Distribution ==
This species occurs in the Caribbean Sea, the Gulf of Mexico and the Lesser Antilles. Fossils have been found from the Early Pleistocene to the Middle Pleistocene in Southern Florida, Florida, United States.
