= Agathotoma subtilis =

Scientific classification
- Kingdom: Animalia
- Phylum: Mollusca
- Class: Gastropoda
- Subclass: Caenogastropoda
- Order: Neogastropoda
- Superfamily: Conoidea
- Family: Mangeliidae
- Genus: Agathotoma
- Species: A. subtilis

Binomial name
- Agathotoma subtilis (R.B. Watson, 1881)

Synonyms
- Pleurotoma (Mangilia) subtilis (R.B. Watson, 1881) superseded combination; Pleurotoma subtilis R.B. Watson, 1881 superseded combination

Species of gastropod

Agathotoma subtilis is a species of sea snail, a marine gastropod mollusk in the family Mangeliidae.

== Description ==
The length of the shell attains 7.8 mm.

(Original description) The shell is very small, conical, and sharp-tipped with a lop-sided base. It is subscalar, featuring distinct ribs and spiral threads. The shell has a prominent labral varix with a small, deep, round sinus.

Sculpture Longitudinals: On the body whorl, there are about thirteen rounded, rather weak, slightly oblique longitudinal ribs extending to the snout. These ribs are fewer but rather stronger on the fifth and sixth whorls and become lamellar on the fourth whorl. They are separated by shallow, open furrows that are about two-thirds the width of the ribs. The entire surface is covered with microscopic but coarse, hair-like lines of growth.

Spirals: There are 25 to 30 close-set, flatly rounded spiral threads that alternate between stronger and weaker. The threads on the shoulder and base of the body whorl are the weakest, while the twelve threads in the middle of the body whorl are the broadest. The threads on the snout are the most prominent, especially the uppermost three. Among the group of spirals on the body whorl, the highest thread just below the sinus area forms a very slight keel on the whorls.

The colour of the shell is buff.

The spire is subscalar, high, and conical. The apex consists of 13 embryonic whorls that rise in a regular manner to a high, finely rounded point, with the extreme tip being quite prominent. The shell has seven whorls, which increase regularly in size, are high and rather narrow, and very slightly carinated. The whorls are convex, with the body whorl being long and narrow, nearly cylindrical in the middle. The base on the right side is scarcely contracted, whereas on the left side, it is significantly truncated in a long, oblique manner, giving it a notably lop-sided appearance. The suture is distinct and impressed, though not deep.

The aperture is elongated and narrow, with nearly parallel sides. A short, open siphonal canal extends in the same width and direction as the aperture, terminating in a deep notch. Above, the sinus is approximately half the width of the aperture, curving obliquely through the thickened lip in a funnel shape. The outer lip is obliquely oriented, almost straight with a slight inward curve, notably thickened, and smoothly rounded on its inner face. Its sides run parallel and are reinforced by a prominent rounded varix extending towards the short snout, but not reaching the columella. Internally, a faintly textured pad is discernible, faintly toothed, culminating in a small, rounded and rather prominent tubercle on the lower side of the sinus. The inner lip appears very narrow and thin, housing a thickened pad between the sinus and the body whorl, with an oblique, slightly concave orientation; above, it runs straight along the columella.

== Distribution ==
This marine species occurs in the Atlantic Ocean of Pernambuco, Brazil.
