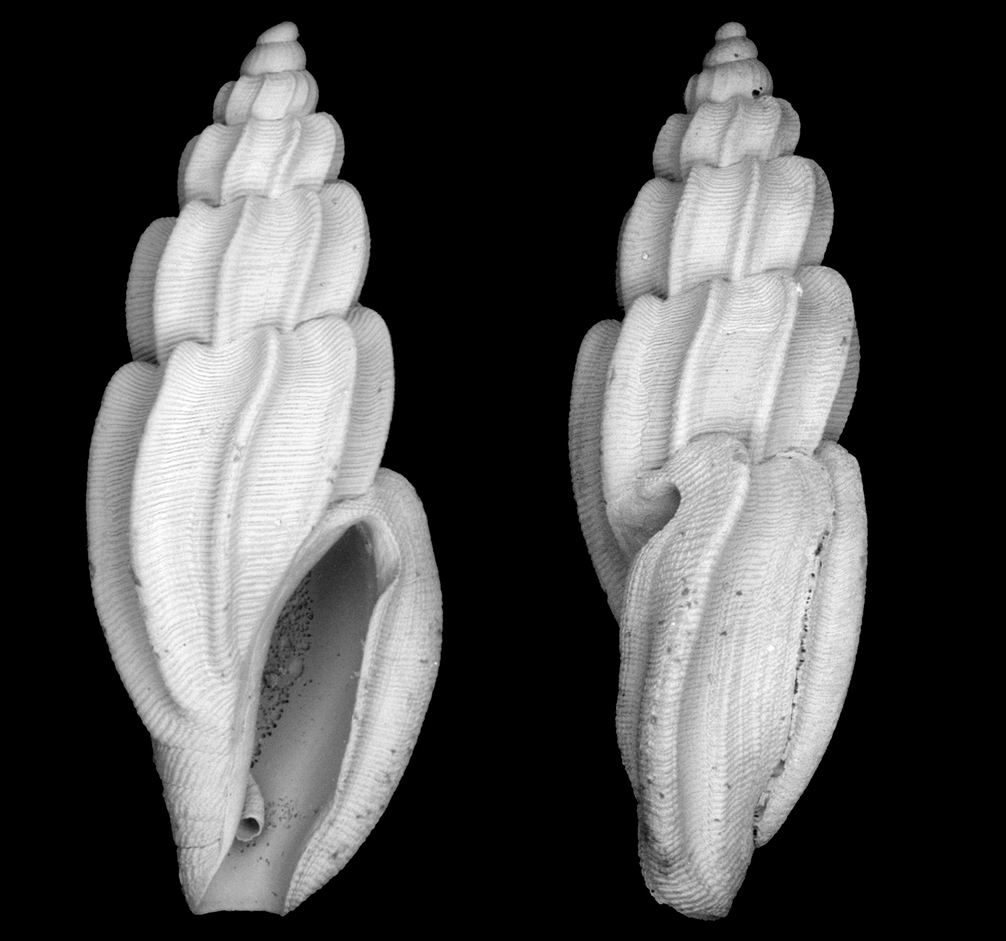
- Shell of † Agathotoma pseudolabratula (holotype at MNHN, Paris)

Scientific classification
- Kingdom: Animalia
- Phylum: Mollusca
- Class: Gastropoda
- Subclass: Caenogastropoda
- Order: Neogastropoda
- Superfamily: Conoidea
- Family: Mangeliidae
- Genus: Agathotoma
- Species: †A. pseudolabratula

Binomial name
- †Agathotoma pseudolabratula Lozouet, 2015

= Agathotoma pseudolabratula =

Extinct species of gastropod

Agathotoma pseudolabratula is an extinct species of sea snails, a marine gastropod mollusk in the family Mangeliidae.

== Distribution ==
This extinct species was found in Oligocene and Lower Miocene strata of Aquitaine, France.
