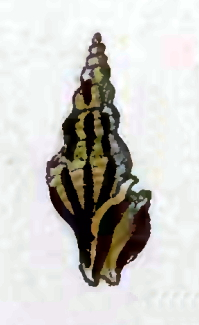
- Shell of Agathotoma neglecta

Scientific classification
- Kingdom: Animalia
- Phylum: Mollusca
- Class: Gastropoda
- Subclass: Caenogastropoda
- Order: Neogastropoda
- Superfamily: Conoidea
- Family: Mangeliidae
- Genus: Agathotoma
- Species: A. neglecta

Binomial name
- Agathotoma neglecta (Adams C. B., 1852)

Synonyms
- Defrancia despecta Adams, H.G. & A. Adams, 1853 (nomen nudum); Mangelia neglecta Adams C. B., 1852

= Agathotoma neglecta =

Species of gastropod

Agathotoma neglecta is a species of sea snail, a marine gastropod mollusk in the family Mangeliidae.

== Description ==
The length of the shell varies between 5 mm and 7.5 mm.

The ribs are rounded, approximated, transversely elevately striated. The color of the shell is rusty brown.

(Original description) The shell is subfusiform and pale brownish-red, with each whorl featuring eight or nine prominent curved ribs. An elevated spiral line runs along the middle of the whorls, becoming obsolete on the body whorl. Anteriorly, the shell has several spiral striae. The apex is acute, and the spire has moderately convex outlines. The shell comprises seven rather convex whorls with a distinct suture. The aperture is rather narrow and mostly parallel with the axis of the spire. The outer lip is significantly thickened both inside and out, with a narrow sinus. The siphonal canal is very short.

== Distribution ==
This species occurs in the Pacific Ocean off Panama and Mexico.
