= Agathotoma secalis =

Scientific classification
- Kingdom: Animalia
- Phylum: Mollusca
- Class: Gastropoda
- Subclass: Caenogastropoda
- Order: Neogastropoda
- Superfamily: Conoidea
- Family: Mangeliidae
- Genus: Agathotoma
- Species: A. secalis

Binomial name
- Agathotoma secalis Shasky, 1971

Synonyms
- Vitricythara secalis Shasky, D.R., 1971

Species of gastropod

Agathotoma secalis is a species of sea snail, a marine gastropod mollusk in the family Mangeliidae.

== Description ==
The length of the shell attains 7 mm, its diameter is 2.3 mm.

== Distribution ==
This species occurs in the Pacific Ocean off Mexico.
