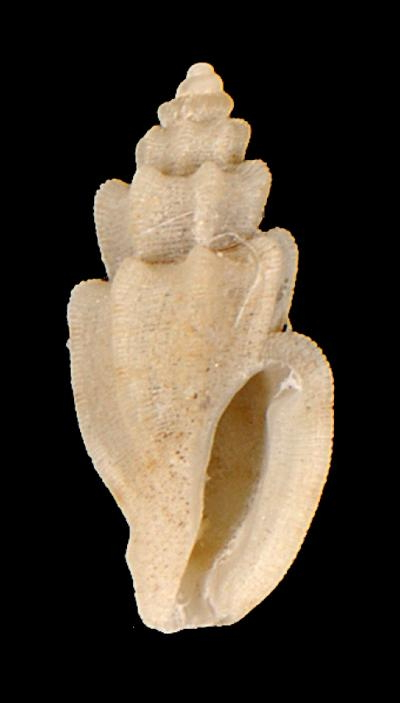
- Shell of Agathotoma castellata (specimen at MNHN, Paris)

Scientific classification
- Kingdom: Animalia
- Phylum: Mollusca
- Class: Gastropoda
- Subclass: Caenogastropoda
- Order: Neogastropoda
- Superfamily: Conoidea
- Family: Mangeliidae
- Genus: Agathotoma
- Species: A. castellata

Binomial name
- Agathotoma castellata (E. A. Smith, 1888)

Synonyms
- Agathotoma costellata Smith, E.A., 1888 (lapsus); Pleurotoma (Mangilia) castellata E. A. Smith, 1888 (original combination); Pseudorhaphitoma castellata (E. A. Smith, 1888)

= Agathotoma castellata =

Species of gastropod

Agathotoma castellata is a species of sea snail, a marine gastropod mollusk in the family Mangeliidae.

== Description ==
The length of the shell attains 6 1/2 mm, its diameter 2 1/2 mm.

(Original description) The white, oblong, turreted shell has 6 to 7 whorls, including two in the protoconch. This shell is elegantly formed, with whorls that are narrower at the base than above, giving it a turreted appearance. The prominent plicate ribs are particularly notable, with the penultimate rib on the body whorl significantly distant from the rib that forms the outer lip. The ribs are slightly extended at the upper end, giving the whorls a castellated appearance, and they are continuous up the spire in all four examples examined. The aperture is narrow, and the siphonal canal is short and truncate.

== Distribution ==
This species occurs in the Caribbean Sea off Guadeloupe, Aruba; Curaçao and Venezuela; also off the Bahamas at depths between 3 and 21 m.; also off Brazil.
