= Agathotoma apocrypha =

Scientific classification
- Kingdom: Animalia
- Phylum: Mollusca
- Class: Gastropoda
- Subclass: Caenogastropoda
- Order: Neogastropoda
- Superfamily: Conoidea
- Family: Mangeliidae
- Genus: Agathotoma
- Species: A. apocrypha

Binomial name
- Agathotoma apocrypha (García, 2008)

Synonyms
- Suturocythara apocrypha Garcia, 2008 (original combination)

Species of gastropod

Agathotoma apocrypha is a species of sea snail, a marine gastropod mollusc in the family Mangeliidae.

== Distribution ==
This species occurs in the Caribbean Sea off Mexico and Guadeloupe.
