= Mangelia densilineata =

Scientific classification
- Kingdom: Animalia
- Phylum: Mollusca
- Class: Gastropoda
- Subclass: Caenogastropoda
- Order: Neogastropoda
- Superfamily: Conoidea
- Family: Mangeliidae
- Genus: Mangelia
- Species: M. densilineata

Binomial name
- Mangelia densilineata (W.H. Dall, 1921)

Synonyms
- Agathotoma densilineata Dall W.H., 1921 (original combination); Mangilia striosa (not of C.B. Adams, 1852)

Species of gastropod

Mangelia densilineata is a species of sea snail, a marine gastropod mollusk in the family Mangeliidae.

== Distribution ==
This marine species occurs off Baja California, Mexico.
