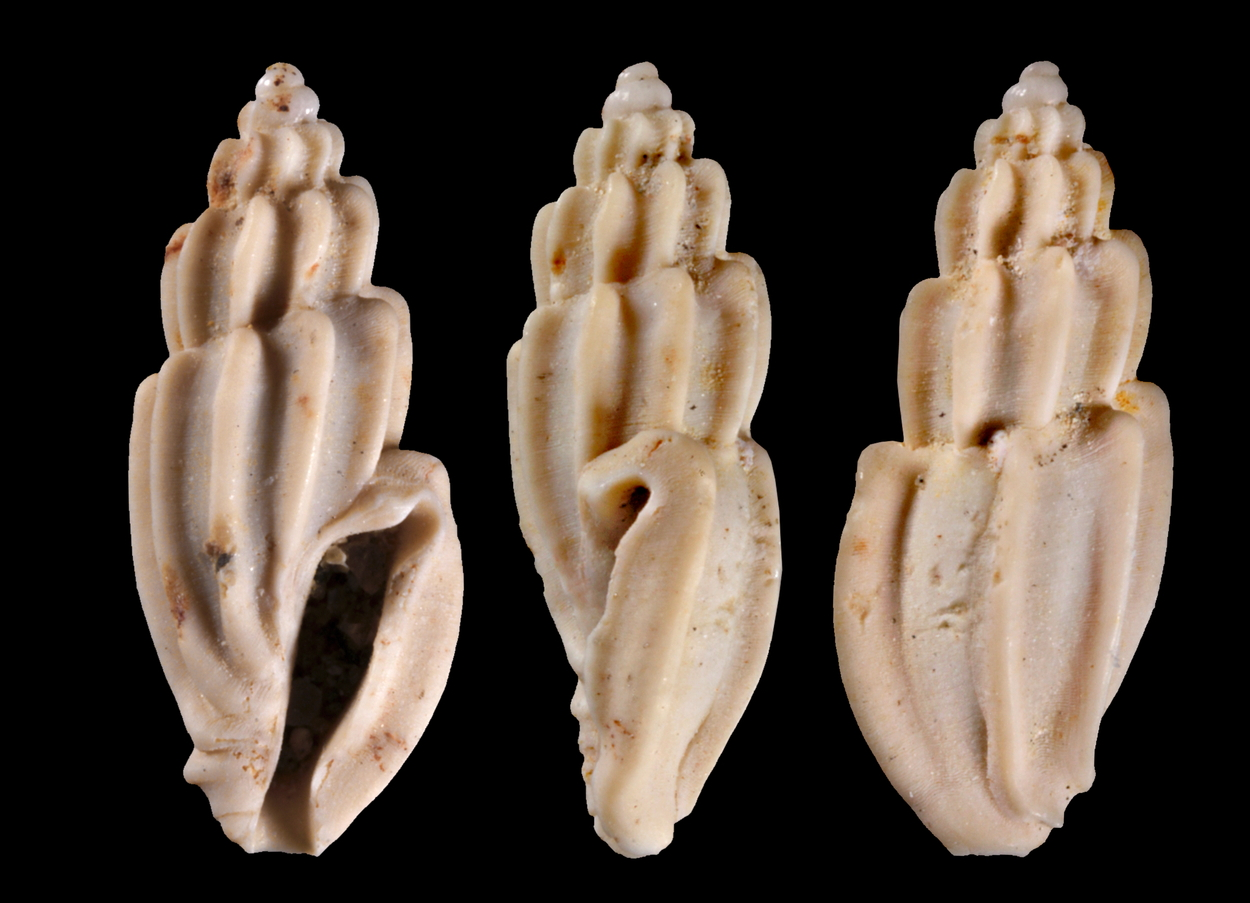
- Shell of † Agathotoma subfoliata (holotype at MNHN, Paris)

Scientific classification
- Kingdom: Animalia
- Phylum: Mollusca
- Class: Gastropoda
- Subclass: Caenogastropoda
- Order: Neogastropoda
- Superfamily: Conoidea
- Family: Mangeliidae
- Genus: Agathotoma
- Species: †A. subfoliata

Binomial name
- †Agathotoma subfoliata (O. Boettger, 1902)

Synonyms
- † Mangilia subfoliata O. Boettger, 1902 superseded combination

= Agathotoma subfoliata =

Extinct species of gastropod

Agathotoma subfoliata is an extinct species of sea snails, a marine gastropod mollusk in the family Mangeliidae.

== Distribution ==
This extinct species was found in the Upper Oligocene strata of Aquitaine, France and Middle Miocene strata in Romania.
