= Anal sulcus =

Notch in gastropod shells

The anal sulcus, also called the anal sinus or anal canal, in Gastropods is a notch, a shelly tube at the top of the aperture. It is the first notch close to the suture. It houses the anal siphon through which the snail expels water and waste products.

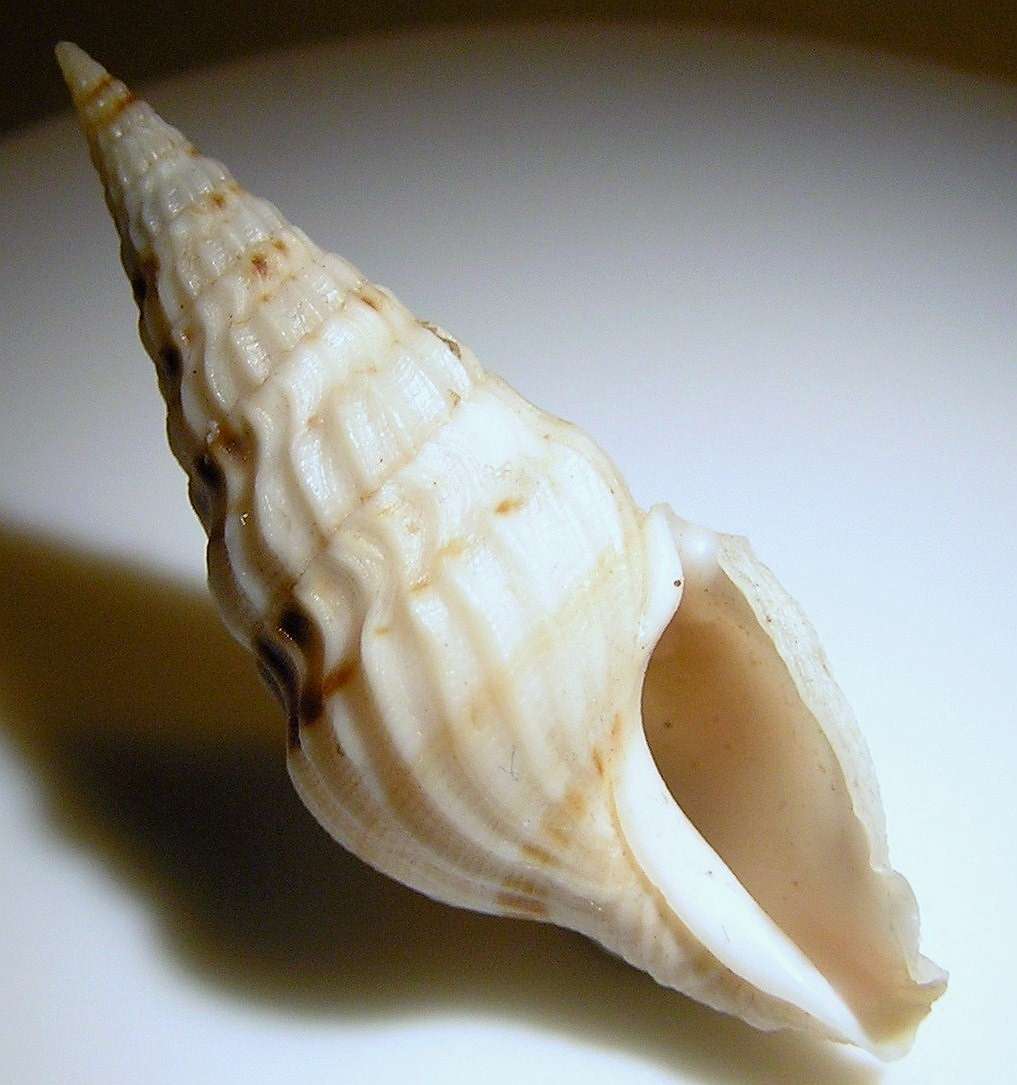
Shell of Drillia poecila Sysoev & Bouchet, 2001, showing the anal sulcus on top of the aperture

The anal sulcus can be described, according to the species, as well-defined, weakly defined, shallow, sharp, wide, narrow or inverted U-shaped. In some species, such as in the Murex family, the anal sulcus is absent.

The anal sulcus can be linked on the edges to a fasciole, a spiral band on the shell, formed by successive growth lines. It can also have a subsutural callus (such as in Clathrodrillia callianira).
