= H. militaris =

H. militaris may refer to:

- Haematoderus militaris, the crimson fruitcrow, a bird species found in Brazil, French Guiana, Guyana, Suriname and Venezuela
- Hindsiclava militaris, a sea snail species

== Synonyms ==
- Habenaria militaris, a synonym for Habenaria rhodocheila, an orchid species found from South China to peninsular Malaysia and the Philippines
- Hibiscus militaris, a synonym for Hibiscus laevis, the halberd-leaf rosemallow, a herbaceous perennial flower species native to central and eastern North America

== See also ==
- Militaris (disambiguation)
