= Ignorata =

Ignorata may refer to:

- Agyneta ignorata, species of sheet weaver
- Dichomeris ignorata, species of moth
- Hindsiclava ignorata, species of sea snail
- Hoya ignorata, species of flowering plant
- Lyces ignorata, species of moth
- Nocardia ignorata, species of bacteria
- Odostomia ignorata, species of sea snail
- Orculella ignorata, species of mollusc
- Pammene ignorata, species of moth
