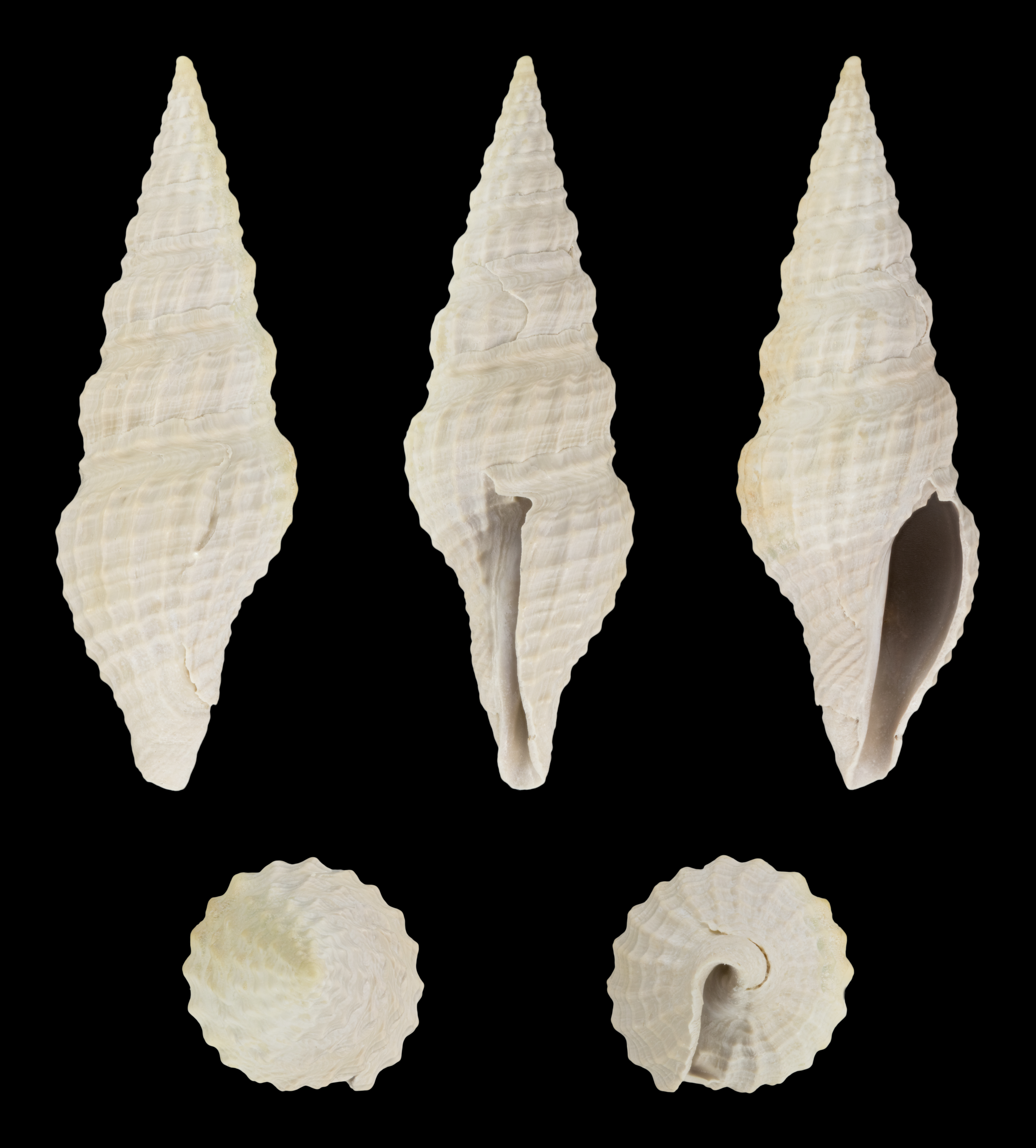

Scientific classification
- Kingdom: Animalia
- Phylum: Mollusca
- Class: Gastropoda
- Subclass: Caenogastropoda
- Order: Neogastropoda
- Superfamily: Conoidea
- Family: Pseudomelatomidae
- Genus: Hindsiclava
- Species: H. perspirata

Binomial name
- Hindsiclava perspirata (W. H. Dall, 1890)

Synonyms
- † Drillia alesidota perspirata W. H. Dall, 1890

= Hindsiclava perspirata =

Extinct species of gastropod

Hindsiclava perspirata is an extinct species of sea snail, a marine gastropod mollusc in the family Pseudomelatomidae, the turrids and allies.

== Description ==
The length of the shell attains 29 mm, its diameter 10 mm.

(Original description) This species differs from the recent Hindsiclava alesidota (Dall, 1889) and Hindsiclava macilenta (Dall, 1889) in its shorter whorls, its proportionally greater stoutness, coarser and rounder spiral sculpture, a more constricted anal fasciole and a stronger and more angular band between the fasciole and the suture. The number of whorls is about the same in both.

== Distribution ==
Fossils of this marine species were found in Pliocene strata in Florida, United States; age range: 3.6 to 0.781 Ma
