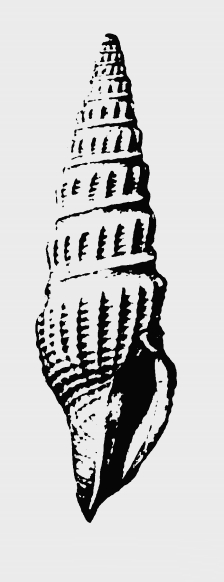
- Image of a shell of † Hindsiclava calligonoides

Scientific classification
- Kingdom: Animalia
- Phylum: Mollusca
- Class: Gastropoda
- Subclass: Caenogastropoda
- Order: Neogastropoda
- Superfamily: Conoidea
- Family: Pseudomelatomidae
- Genus: Hindsiclava
- Species: H. calligonoides

Binomial name
- Hindsiclava calligonoides (J. Gardner, 1938)

Synonyms
- † Crassispira (Hindsiclava) calligonoides J. Gardner, 1938

= Hindsiclava calligonoides =

Extinct species of gastropod

Hindsiclava calligonoides is an extinct species of sea snail, a marine gastropod mollusc in the family Pseudomelatomidae, the turrids and allies.

== Description ==
The length of the shell attains 32 mm, its diameter 8.5 mm.

(Original description) The shell is slender. The spire is elevated and acute. The aperture is only a little more than one-third as high as the entire shell. The shell contains numerous whorls, 11 or 12 in the spire of the adult. The protoconch is smooth, polished, papillate, thrice coiled. The initial whorls is coiled in a single plane, largely submerged. The succeeding whorls become increasingly less depressed and broadly elevated. The body whorl is moderately high and evenly convex. The line of demarcation between spire and the protoconch is indicated by the protractive thickening of the shell and by the introduction of the axial sculpture. Each of the earlier whorls contains 12 axials, feebly protractive, strongly elevated, undulatory in character, persistent from the area near the appressed posterior margin of the whorl to the anterior suture line. The fasciole is indicated on the first volution of the spire. Faintly impressed spirals appear either at the close of the first or the beginning of the second whorl. The sculpture when well established is similar in general characters to that of Crassispira calligona (Maury, 1910). There are 20 axials upon the body of the holotype, rather low, sharply pinched, restricted entirely to the area in front of the fasciole, on the body persistent to the base of the pillar, equal and uniform in strength throughout their extent and separated from one another by wide, concave intercostals. The spiral sculpture is rather subdued. The primaries in front of the fasciole number normally five on the penultimate whorl, 12 to 15 on the body whorl and columella, very low, broad, overriding the axials, separated by interspirals of approximately the same width in which are intercalated 2, 3, or even 4 microscopically fine secondaries. The spirals are narrower and more threadlike upon the base of the body and the columella, gradually becoming feeble anteriorly and on the anterior fasciole replaced by a fine, close threading. The posterior fasciole is broad, sharply defined, smoothly concave, free from axial sculpture except for conspicuous incrementals. They are very finely located spirally, the three or four threadlets upon the anterior and medial portions the least fine, those behind them mere microscopic striae, commonly obscure. A similar striation generally developed behind the sutural carina, which is sharply elevated but not crowned by a well-defined cord. The suture line is slightly impressed and inconspicuous. The aperture is narrowly clavate. The outer lip is broadly but not strongly arcuate, slightly expanded incrementally. The posterior siphonal notch is broad but rather shallow, symmetrically disposed upon the fasciole. The inner margin of the aperture is constricted at the base of the body, smoothly and rather heavily glazed. The anterior canal is a little long for the genus, rather broad and very feebly recurved. The anterior siphonal fasciole is lirate and incrementally corrugated and broadly emarginate anteriorly.

== Distribution ==
Fossils of this marine species were found in Miocene strata in the Shoal River Formation, Florida, United States.; age range: 13.65 to 11.608 Ma
