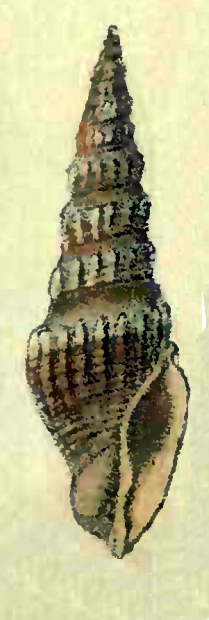
- Drawing of a shell of Hindsiclava appelii

Scientific classification
- Kingdom: Animalia
- Phylum: Mollusca
- Class: Gastropoda
- Subclass: Caenogastropoda
- Order: Neogastropoda
- Superfamily: Conoidea
- Family: Pseudomelatomidae
- Genus: Hindsiclava
- Species: H. appelii

Binomial name
- Hindsiclava appelii (Weinkauff & Kobelt, 1876)

Synonyms
- Drillia appelii (Weinkauff & Kobelt, 1876); Pleurotoma appelii Weinkauff & Kobelt, 1876

= Hindsiclava appelii =

Species of gastropod

Hindsiclava appelii, common name the chocolate turrid, is a species of sea snail, a marine gastropod mollusk in the family Pseudomelatomidae, the turrids and allies.

== Description ==
The length of the shell varies between 18 mm and 28 mm.

The shell is narrower than Crassispira callosa (Kiener, 1840), with more numerous ribs and a longer siphonal canal. Its color is light ochraceous. The shell is indistinctly white-banded.

== Distribution ==
This species occurs in the Atlantic Ocean off Brazil
