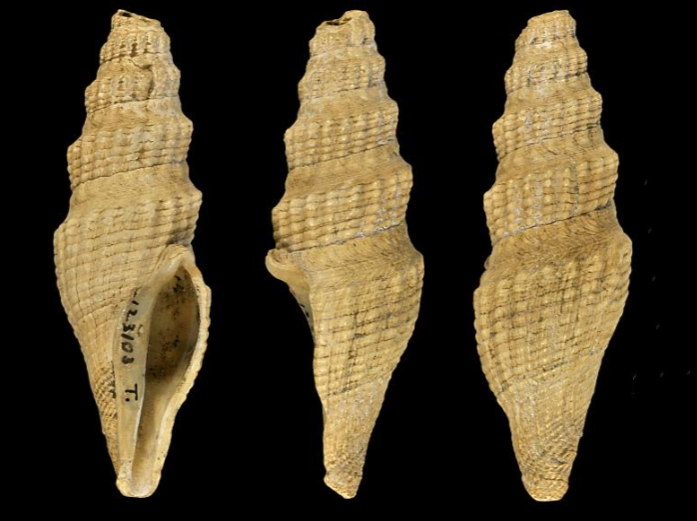
- Shell of Hindsiclava resina (holotype at the Smithsonian Institution)

Scientific classification
- Kingdom: Animalia
- Phylum: Mollusca
- Class: Gastropoda
- Subclass: Caenogastropoda
- Order: Neogastropoda
- Superfamily: Conoidea
- Family: Pseudomelatomidae
- Genus: Hindsiclava
- Species: H. resina

Binomial name
- Hindsiclava resina (Dall, 1908)

Synonyms
- Turris resina (Dall, 1908); Turris (Surcula) resina Dall, 1908 (original combination); Clathrodrillia resina (Dall, 1908)

= Hindsiclava resina =

Species of gastropod

Hindsiclava resina is a species of sea snail, a marine gastropod mollusk in the family Pseudomelatomidae.

This species was questionably placed in synonymy with Hindsiclava militaris

== Description ==
The length of the shell varies between 30 mm and 75 mm.

(Original description) The decollate, fusiform shell is moderately large, slender and solid. The spire is longer than the aperture . The shell has a broad, somewhat constricted anal fasciole and closely appressed suture, the fasciole chiefly sculptured by incremental lines. The whorls show an angle at the shoulder where terminate (on the penultimate whorl twenty) straight, somewhat protractive, low, narrow, rather sharp axial ribs. These extend forward on the body whorl nearly to the base. Incremental lines are rather prominent. The spiral sculpture consists of a few faint striae on the fasciole, between the fasciole and the next suture on the spire of five or six strap-like ridges with narrower interspaces often containing an obscure small intercalary thread, overriding the ribs without nodulation at the intersections. On the body whorl these ridges extend, somewhat diminishing in size, forward to the end of the siphonal canal, occasionally divided by a medial incised line, and with few intercalary threads, numbering about twenty-five in all. The aperture is narrow. The outer lip is defective, but by the lines of growth not much produced. The anal sulcus is shallow and pronounced. The posterior angle of the aperture is produced, much thickened and recurved. The columella is straight, smooth, callous, its axis impervious. The siphonal canal is straight and rather wide. The interior of the outer lip is smooth.

== Distribution ==
This species occurs in the Pacific Ocean from Panama to Peru
