= Hoya amicabilis =

Scientific classification
- Kingdom: Plantae
- Clade: Embryophytes
- Clade: Tracheophytes
- Clade: Angiosperms
- Clade: Eudicots
- Clade: Asterids
- Order: Gentianales
- Family: Apocynaceae
- Genus: Hoya
- Species: H. amicabilis

Binomial name
- Hoya amicabilis S.Rahayu & Rodda

Species of flowering plant

Hoya amicabilis is a species of flowering plant native to Jawa.

H. amicabilis is known from one locality in Bruno, Purworejo, Indonesia.

== Description ==
H. amicabilis has bright yellow, bell-shaped, flowers, similar to those of Hoya nuttiana. The leaves are thin and leathery. Unlike most species of its genus, it is shrubby, rather than climbing. A distinctive feature of the species is the oblong shape of its staminal corona lobes. The original specimen was reportedly collected from a hollow tree trunk in a Pinus merkusii forest, at an elevation of around 900–1,000 metres (3,000–3,300 ft). When unfertilised, the species is similar to Hoya ignorata.

== Discovery and naming ==
The species was discovered from pictures posted on Facebook in 2017. The plant was traced to Java, and a specimen was retrieved from Bogor Botanical Gardens. The species was described in 2019.

It was named after social media (Latin: amicabiliter interventus) in recognition of social media's impact on the discovery of new species.

== See also ==
- List of Hoya species
