= S. militaris =

S. militaris may refer to:

- Sophronitis militaris, a synonym for Sophronitis coccinea, an orchid species found from Brazil to Argentina
- Sturnella militaris, the red-breasted blackbird, a passerine bird species found from southwestern Costa Rica and Trinidad, south to northeastern Peru and central Brazil

== See also ==
- Militaris (disambiguation)
