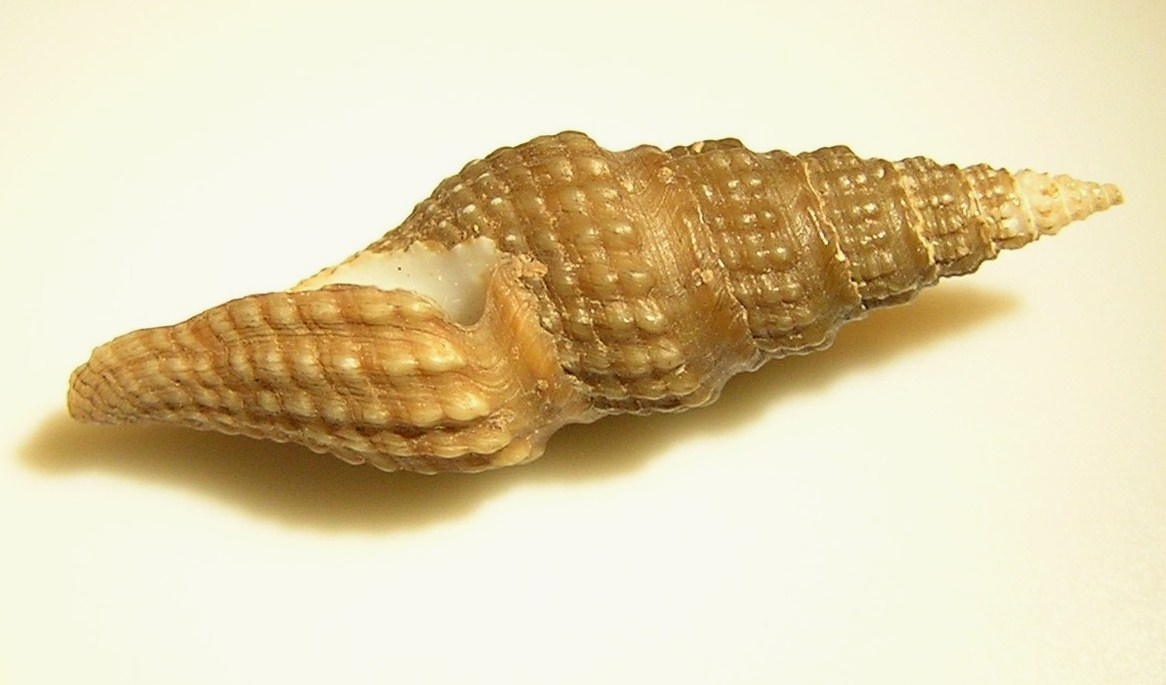

Scientific classification
- Kingdom: Animalia
- Phylum: Mollusca
- Class: Gastropoda
- Subclass: Caenogastropoda
- Order: Neogastropoda
- Superfamily: Conoidea
- Family: Pseudomelatomidae
- Genus: Hindsiclava; Hertlein & A.M. Strong, 1955

Type species
- Pleurotoma militaris Reeve, 1843

Species
- See text

Synonyms
- Turrigemma Berry, 1958

= Hindsiclava =

Genus of gastropods

Hindsiclava is a genus of sea snails, marine gastropod mollusks in the family Pseudomelatomidae,

== Description ==
Hindsiclava is characterized by strong axial ribs and cords, giving the surface of the shell a reticulate appearance. They all have a well-developed anal node of callus, appearing only in adult specimens.

== Distribution ==
This genus is only known from the New World in its fossil and Recent species.

== Species ==
Species within the genus Hindsiclava include:

- Hindsiclava alesidota (Dall, 1889)
- Hindsiclava andromeda (Dall, 1919)
- † Hindsiclava antealesidota (Mansfield, 1930)
- Hindsiclava appelii (Weinkauff & Kobelt, 1876)
- † Hindsiclava blountensis (Mansfield, 1935)
- † Hindsiclava calligonoides (Gardner, 1938)
- † Hindsiclava caroniana (Maury, 1925)
- Hindsiclava consors (Sowerby I, 1850)
- † Hindsiclava eupora (Dall, 1915)
- † Hindsiclava henekeni (Sowerby I, 1850)
- Hindsiclava hertleini Emerson & Radwin, 1969
- † Hindsiclava ignorata Frassinetti & Covacevich, 1995
- Hindsiclava jungi (Macsotay & Campos Villarroel, 2001)
- Hindsiclava macilenta (Dall, 1889)
- Hindsiclava militaris (Reeve, 1843)
- † Hindsiclava perspirata (Dall, 1890)
- Hindsiclava polytorta (Dall, 1881)
- † Hindsiclava paraconsors (Gardner, 1938)
- † Hindsiclava pyrgoma Woodring, 1970
- Hindsiclava resina (Dall, 1908)
- Hindsiclava rosenstielanus Tippett, 2007
- Hindsiclava tippetti Petuch, 1987
- † Hindsiclava wiedenmayeri Landau, Da Silva & Heitz, 2016

Species brought into synonymy

- Hindsiclava chazaliei (Dautzenberg, 1900): synonym of Crassispira chazaliei (Dautzenberg, 1900)
- Hindsiclava dotella Dall, 1908: synonym of Hindsiclava militaris (Hinds, in Reeve, 1843)
- Hindsiclava notilla Dall, 1919 : synonym of Hindsiclava militaris (Hinds, in Reeve, 1843)
- Hindsiclava torquifer Berry, 1958: synonym of Hindsiclava andromeda (Dall, 1919)
