= Hindsiclava jungi =

Scientific classification
- Kingdom: Animalia
- Phylum: Mollusca
- Class: Gastropoda
- Subclass: Caenogastropoda
- Order: Neogastropoda
- Superfamily: Conoidea
- Family: Pseudomelatomidae
- Genus: Hindsiclava
- Species: H. jungi

Binomial name
- Hindsiclava jungi (Macsotay & Campos Villarroel, 2001)

Synonyms
- Crassispira jungi Macsotay & Campos Villarroel, 2001

Species of gastropod

Hindsiclava jungi is a species of sea snails, a marine gastropod mollusc in the family Pseudomelatomidae, the turrids.

== Description ==
The length of the shell attains 59 mm.

== Distribution ==
This marine species occurs off Isla Margarita, Venezuela.
