= Hindsiclava henekeni =

Scientific classification
- Kingdom: Animalia
- Phylum: Mollusca
- Class: Gastropoda
- Subclass: Caenogastropoda
- Order: Neogastropoda
- Superfamily: Conoidea
- Family: Pseudomelatomidae
- Genus: Hindsiclava
- Species: H. henekeni

Binomial name
- Hindsiclava henekeni (G. B. Sowerby I, 1850)

Synonyms
- † Conocardium abruptum Barrande, 1881; † Crassispira (Crassispira) henekeni (G. B. Sowerby I, 1850); † Crassispira henekeni (G. B. Sowerby I, 1850); † Drillia henekeni (G. B. Sowerby I, 1850); † Pleurotoma henekeni G. B. Sowerby I, 1850 (original combination); † Pleurotoma henikeri (G. B. Sowerby I, 1850); † Turris (Surcula) henekeni (G. B. Sowerby I, 1850)

Extinct species of gastropod

Hindsiclava henekeni is an extinct species of sea snail, a marine gastropod mollusc in the family Pseudomelatomidae, the turrids and allies.

Subspecies

- † Hindsiclava henekeni leptalea W. P. Woodring, 1970

== Distribution ==
Fossils of this marine species were found in Pliocene strata and in Miocene strata in the Caribbean Sea area; age range: 15.97 to 3.6 Ma
