= Hindsiclava hertleini =

Scientific classification
- Kingdom: Animalia
- Phylum: Mollusca
- Class: Gastropoda
- Subclass: Caenogastropoda
- Order: Neogastropoda
- Superfamily: Conoidea
- Family: Pseudomelatomidae
- Genus: Hindsiclava
- Species: H. hertleini

Binomial name
- Hindsiclava hertleini Emerson & Radwin, 1969

Species of gastropod

Hindsiclava hertleini is a species of sea snails, a marine gastropod mollusc in the family Pseudomelatomidae, the turrids and allies

== Description ==
The length of the shell varies between 17 mm and 50 mm.

== Distribution ==
This marine species occurs off the Galapagos Islands
