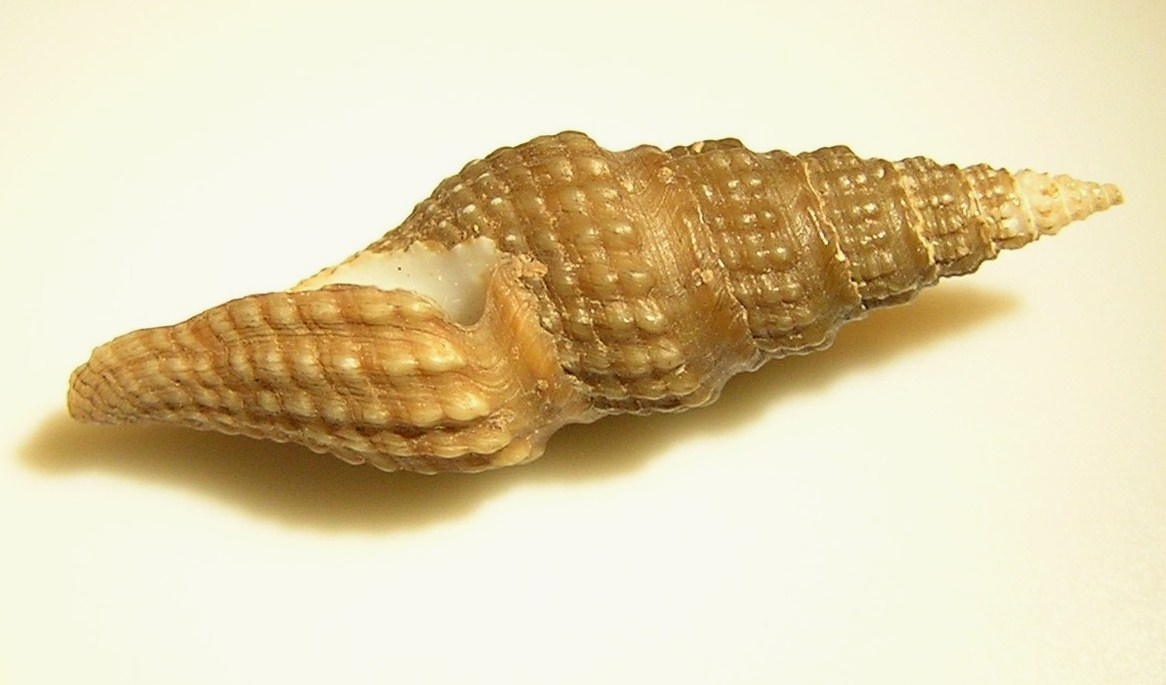
- Apertural view of a shell of Hindsiclava andromeda

Scientific classification
- Kingdom: Animalia
- Phylum: Mollusca
- Class: Gastropoda
- Subclass: Caenogastropoda
- Order: Neogastropoda
- Superfamily: Conoidea
- Family: Pseudomelatomidae
- Genus: Hindsiclava
- Species: H. andromeda

Binomial name
- Hindsiclava andromeda (Dall, 1919)

Synonyms
- Clathrodrillia andromeda Dall, 1919 (original combination); Turrigemma torquifer Berry, 1958

= Hindsiclava andromeda =

Species of gastropod

Hindsiclava andromeda is a species of sea snail, a marine gastropod mollusk in the family Pseudomelatomidae.

== Description ==
The length of the shell varies between 16 mm and 60 mm.

(Original description) The acute, fusiform shell is whitish with a brown periostracum. The protoconch is small, the apex is minutely globular and, with the succeeding inflated whorl, smooth. The subsequent eight whorls are regularly increasing in diameter. The suture is closely appressed, obscure, bordered in front by two undulated cords, the anterior cord larger. The axial sculpture consists of (on the body whorl 18) equal narrow nodulous ribs with subequal interspaces. The ribs extend well over the base from the anterior margin of the anal fasciole, where they form a marked shoulder. The incremental lines are hardly noticeable except on the fasciole. The spiral sculpture consists of (on the spire three) strong cords, the posterior slightly larger, which become swollen and nodulous where they intersect the summit of the ribs. On the body whorl there are 7 of these cords and 10 minor threads in front of the base and on the siphonal canal. In the interspaces between the major cords there are from one to three fine threads which do not become nodulous. The anal fasciole is narrow, concave, somewhat removed from the suture, the sulcus shallow. In the type specimen the outer lip is thin and sharp. The inner lip is erased, but if the specimen is immature the outer lip would probably be thickened with a subsutural callus in the adult. The white columella is straight, and attenuated in front. The siphonal canal is distinct and not recurved.

== Distribution ==
This marine species occurs from to Sea of Cortez, Western Mexico to Panama
