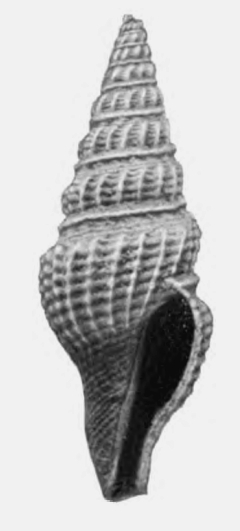
- Image of a shell of † Crassispira calligona

Scientific classification
- Kingdom: Animalia
- Phylum: Mollusca
- Class: Gastropoda
- Subclass: Caenogastropoda
- Order: Neogastropoda
- Superfamily: Conoidea
- Family: Pseudomelatomidae
- Genus: Crassispira
- Species: C. calligona

Binomial name
- Crassispira calligona (Maury, 1910)

Synonyms
- † Drillia calligona Maury, 1910

= Crassispira calligona =

Extinct species of gastropod

Crassispira calligona is an extinct species of sea snail, a marine gastropod mollusk in the family Pseudomelatomidae, the turrids and allies.

Subspecies

- † Crassispira calligona paraconsors Gardner, 1938 (synonym of † Hindsiclava paraconsors J. Gardner, 1938

== Description ==
The length of the shell attains 21 mm, its diameter 7.5 mm.

The elongated shell resembles in form the recent Pyrgospira ostrearum (Stearns, 1872). The spire is acute with 2 whorls in the protoconch followed by seven subsequent whorls. The 2 earlier whorls show well-marked transverse ribs but little or no spiral sculpture. The spirals on the later whorls are stronger, consisting of primaries with alternating finer, secondary threads in pairs; transverse ribs stronger and more numerous on the later whorls (25 on the last) and more sharply defined. The intersecting ribs and spirals form a beautiful cancellation ornamenting the whorls up to the margin of the groove, where the ribs end abruptly. In the groove, lines of growth and fine, subequal spirals form the only sculpture. The upper margin of the groove is marked by a sharp carination sloping steeply to the suture. The aperture is narrow with a smooth callus.

The whorls of the protoconch are probably 3 in the adult; those of the spire 10. The protoconch is smooth, highly polished, and somewhat papillate, the initial whorl for the most part submerged, the succeeding volution rather low and broadly inflated, the final whorl of the protoconch flattened laterally and relatively high. The line of demarcation between the spire and the protoconch is initiated by a protractive thickening of the shell and the introduction of 10 to 12 undulatory protractive riblets on the earlier whorls of the spire, persistent from the appressed posterior margin to the anterior suture. The spiral sculpture first appears near the beginning of the second whorl in the shape of 5 or 6 very faintly impressed sulci. The sculpture is modified with the growth of the shell, so that on the later whorls of the adult the axials increase to as many as 25 and are very sharply pinched, equal and regular in size and spacing, even near the aperture and persistent with uniform strength from the anterior margin of the fasciole to the anterior suture and on the body whorl almost to the base of the columella. They are separated by slightly concave intercostals of more than double their width. The anal fasciole is smoothly concave, more than one-third the width of the whorl in the adult, margined posteriorly by a well-defined sutural cord lirated with 2 or 3 low threads but devoid of any axial ribbing or undulations. The primary spirals in front of the periphery are low, broad, equal, and regular in size and spacing both upon the costal and intercostal areas numbering 4 to 6 on the later whorls of the spire, and separated by shallow channels in which two or three microscopically fine secondaries are usually intercalated. The suture lines are inconspicuous and minutely undulated by the costals of the preceding volution. The aperture is narrowly clavate; the constriction at the base of the body feeble. The outer lip is thin and sharp and expands incrementally. The notch at the posterior fasciole is broadly and symmetrically U-shaped and not very deep. The anterior canal is long for the genus, broad, and very feebly recurved. The anterior fasciole is well defined, closely lirate, incrementally striate, and broadly emarginate at its extremity.

== Distribution ==
Fossils have been found in Oligocene strata of the Chipola Formation, Florida, United States.
