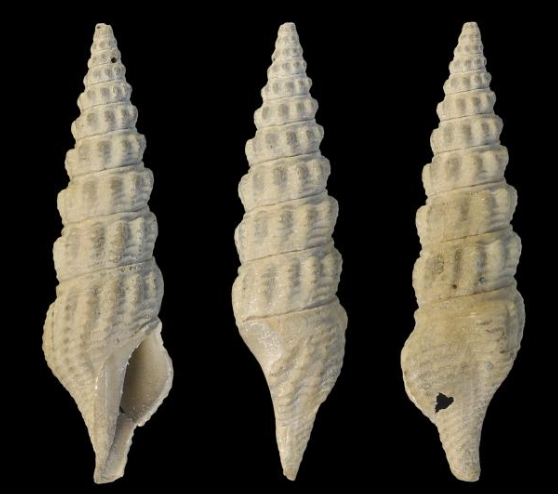
- Shell and protoconch of Hindsiclava polytorta (holotype at the Smithsonian Institution)

Scientific classification
- Kingdom: Animalia
- Phylum: Mollusca
- Class: Gastropoda
- Subclass: Caenogastropoda
- Order: Neogastropoda
- Superfamily: Conoidea
- Family: Pseudomelatomidae
- Genus: Hindsiclava
- Species: H. polytorta

Binomial name
- Hindsiclava polytorta (Dall, 1881)

Synonyms
- Compsodrillia polytorta (Dall, 1881); Drillia polytorta (W.H. Dall, 1881); Pleurotoma (Drillia) polytorta Dall, 1881 (original combination)

= Hindsiclava polytorta =

Species of gastropod

Hindsiclava polytorta is a species of sea snail, a marine gastropod mollusk in the family Pseudomelatomidae.

== Description ==
The length of the shell varies between 30 mm and 60 mm.

(Original description) The large, slender, solid, shell contains about thirteen whorls. These are of a dull ashen color and unpolished surface. The protoconch is missing. The succeeding whorls are transversely sculptured by twelve or thirteen rounded, shouldered ribs. These begin and are largest just before the notch-band, crossing the whorls a little obliquely or even in a directly transverse direction. They become widest at the beginning, becoming narrower and less prominent anteriorly. They fade out or become indistinct on the body whorl on the anterior half, and are less numerous or partially obliterated over the latter part of this whorl in fully developed adults. The lines of growth are more or less distinct, but not uniform, while the ribs on one whorl bear no uniform relation in position to those on the next or preceding whorls. Longitudinally each whorl is appressed in a thickened band against the suture, next in front of which band is the (except on the last half-whorl) narrow unsculptured band indicating the path of the notch. This on the last half-whorl widens out considerably if the specimen in hand be typical, though in this case it may be an individual characteristic. Before the notch-band, and even encroaching a little on it, and extending over the surface of the whorls, are six or seven (on the body whorl seventeen) slightly raised rounded revolving lines, with slightly wider shallow interspaces, which are about equally prominent over the transverse ribs and between them. There is no other sculpture. The aperture is rather short and narrow, slightly more than one third the whole length of the shell. The outer lip is probably thickened. There is a considerable amount of smooth callus on the body whorl and columella. The notch is rather narrow, of variable depth at different stages. The siphonal canal is short, rather open and nearly straight. The body whorl is less than half the length of the shell.

== Distribution ==
H. polytorta can be found in the Yucatan Strait in the Gulf of Mexico.; also off Cape San Antonio, Cuba and off Colombia.
