= Hindsiclava wiedenmayeri =

Scientific classification
- Kingdom: Animalia
- Phylum: Mollusca
- Class: Gastropoda
- Subclass: Caenogastropoda
- Order: Neogastropoda
- Superfamily: Conoidea
- Family: Pseudomelatomidae
- Genus: Hindsiclava
- Species: H. wiedenmayeri

Binomial name
- Hindsiclava wiedenmayeri B.M. Landau, F. Da Silva & S.M. Heitz, 2016

Synonyms
- † Narona wiedenmeyeri [sic] Landau, Petit, Etter, & Silva, 2012

Extinct species of gastropod

Hindsiclava wiedenmayeri is an extinct species of sea snail, a marine gastropod mollusc in the family Pseudomelatomidae, the turrids, allies.

== Distribution ==
Fossils of this marine species have been found in Miocene strata in Venezuela.
