= Hindsiclava caroniana =

Scientific classification
- Kingdom: Animalia
- Phylum: Mollusca
- Class: Gastropoda
- Subclass: Caenogastropoda
- Order: Neogastropoda
- Superfamily: Conoidea
- Family: Pseudomelatomidae
- Genus: Hindsiclava
- Species: H. caroniana

Binomial name
- Hindsiclava caroniana (C.J. Maury, 1925)

Synonyms
- † Crassispira (Crassispira) caroniana (C.J. Maury, 1925); † Crassispira henekeni caroniana (C.J. Maury, 1925); † Drillia henekeni caroniana C.J. Maury, 1925

Extinct species of gastropod

Hindsiclava caroniana is an extinct species of sea snail, a marine gastropod mollusc in the family Pseudomelatomidae, the turrids and allies.

== Distribution ==
Fossils of this marine species were found in Pliocene strata of Venezuela and in Miocene strata of Trinidad and Tobago; age range: 11.608 to 2.588 Ma
