= Hindsiclava pyrgoma =

Scientific classification
- Kingdom: Animalia
- Phylum: Mollusca
- Class: Gastropoda
- Subclass: Caenogastropoda
- Order: Neogastropoda
- Superfamily: Conoidea
- Family: Pseudomelatomidae
- Genus: Hindsiclava
- Species: H. pyrgoma

Binomial name
- Hindsiclava pyrgoma Woodring, 1970

Synonyms
- † Crassispira (Hindsiclava) pyrgoma Woodring, 1970

Extinct species of gastropod

Hindsiclava pyrgoma is an extinct species of sea snail, a marine gastropod mollusc in the family Pseudomelatomidae, the turrids and allies.

== Description ==
The length of the shell attains 35.5 mm, its diameter is 10.5 mm.

== Distribution ==
Fossils of this marine species have been found in Miocene strata in Panama; age range: 7.246 to 5.332 Ma.
