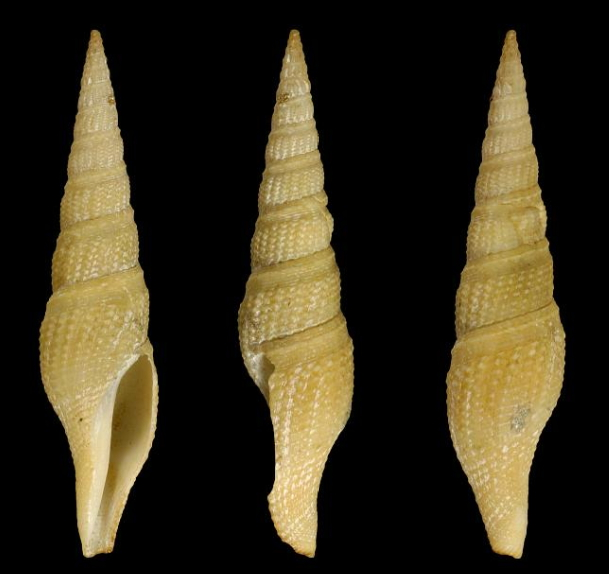
- Shell of Hindsiclava macilenta (syntype at the Smithsonian Institution)

Scientific classification
- Kingdom: Animalia
- Phylum: Mollusca
- Class: Gastropoda
- Subclass: Caenogastropoda
- Order: Neogastropoda
- Superfamily: Conoidea
- Family: Pseudomelatomidae
- Genus: Hindsiclava
- Species: H. macilenta

Binomial name
- Hindsiclava macilenta (Dall, 1889)

Synonyms
- Crassispira (Hindsiclava) macilenta (Dall, 1889); Drillia alesidota var. macilenta Dall, 1889

= Hindsiclava macilenta =

Species of gastropod

Hindsiclava macilenta is a species of sea snail, a marine gastropod mollusc in the family Pseudomelatomidae, the turrids and allies.

== Description ==
The length of the shell varies between 35 mm and 43 mm.

(Original description) In comparison with Hindsiclava alesidota, the shell is more slender, the sculpture more elegant, the spiral element proportionally stronger, existing on the fasciole and siphonal canal, as well as over the rest of the surface. This is a very plain, simple looking species of a dull color.

== Distribution ==
This marine species occurs from North Carolina to West Florida, United States; and off Barbados and Guadeloupe. Early Pliocene fossils have been found in Venezuela.
