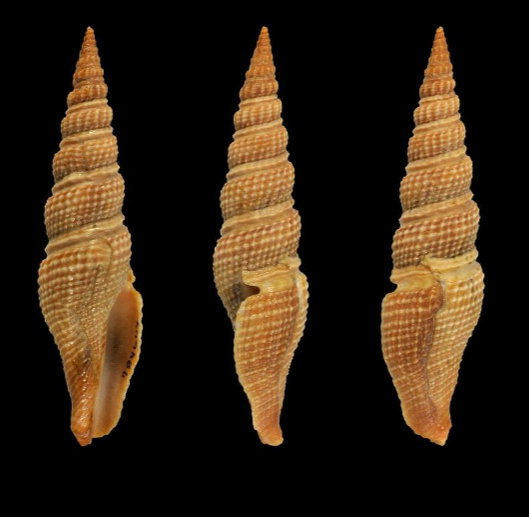
- Shell of Hindsiclava tippetti (holotype at the Smithsonian Institution)

Scientific classification
- Kingdom: Animalia
- Phylum: Mollusca
- Class: Gastropoda
- Subclass: Caenogastropoda
- Order: Neogastropoda
- Superfamily: Conoidea
- Family: Pseudomelatomidae
- Genus: Hindsiclava
- Species: H. tippetti

Binomial name
- Hindsiclava tippetti Petuch, 1987

= Hindsiclava tippetti =

Species of gastropod

Hindsiclava tippetti is a species of sea snail, a marine gastropod mollusk in the family Pseudomelatomidae, the turrids and allies.

== Description ==
Original description: "Shell large for genus, elongate, with elevated spire; shell ornamented with numerous equal-sized axial and spiral cords that are arranged in cancellate pattern; intersection of axial and spiral cord producing large, rounded bead; early whorls with large beaded axial ribs; axial ribs are replaced with cancellate-beaded sculpture on later whorls; subsutural area with large, wide, raised band and channeled unsculptured area that corresponds to anal notch; anal notch wide, deep; aperture narrow; shell color dark brown with tan beads; early whorls and protoconch dark brown; interior of aperture brown."

The length of the shell varies between 27 mm and 75 mm.

== Distribution ==
Locus typicus: "35 m. depth, Rosalind Bank, Honduras."

This species occurs in the Caribbean Sea off Honduras.
