= Hindsiclava blountensis =

Scientific classification
- Kingdom: Animalia
- Phylum: Mollusca
- Class: Gastropoda
- Subclass: Caenogastropoda
- Order: Neogastropoda
- Superfamily: Conoidea
- Family: Pseudomelatomidae
- Genus: Hindsiclava
- Species: H. blountensis

Binomial name
- Hindsiclava blountensis (W.C. Mansfield, 1935)

Synonyms
- † Crassispira (Hindsiclava) blountensis Mansfield 1930

Extinct species of gastropod

Hindsiclava blountensis is an extinct species of sea snail, a marine gastropod mollusc in the family Pseudomelatomidae, the turrids and allies.

== Distribution ==
Fossils of this marine species were found in Miocene strata in Florida, United States.
