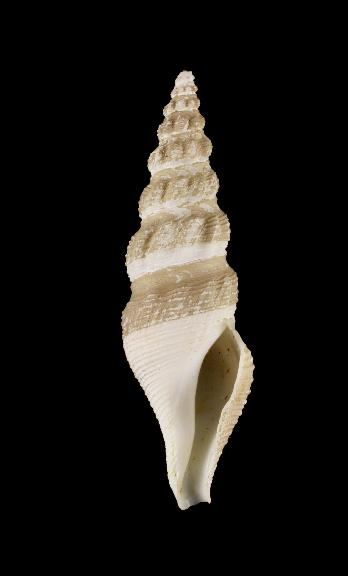
- Shell of Hindsiclava rosenstielanus (specimen at MNHN, Paris)

Scientific classification
- Kingdom: Animalia
- Phylum: Mollusca
- Class: Gastropoda
- Subclass: Caenogastropoda
- Order: Neogastropoda
- Superfamily: Conoidea
- Family: Pseudomelatomidae
- Genus: Hindsiclava
- Species: H. rosenstielanus

Binomial name
- Hindsiclava rosenstielanus Tippett, 2007

= Hindsiclava rosenstielanus =

Species of gastropod

Hindsiclava rosenstielanus is a species of sea snail, a marine gastropod mollusk in the family Pseudomelatomidae, the turrids.

== Distribution ==
This marine species occurs off French Guiana
