= Hindsiclava antealesidota =

Scientific classification
- Kingdom: Animalia
- Phylum: Mollusca
- Class: Gastropoda
- Subclass: Caenogastropoda
- Order: Neogastropoda
- Superfamily: Conoidea
- Family: Pseudomelatomidae
- Genus: Hindsiclava
- Species: H. antealesidota

Binomial name
- Hindsiclava antealesidota (W.C. Mansfield, 1930 )

Synonyms
- † Crassispira (Hindsiclava) antealesidota Mansfield 1930

Extinct species of gastropod

Hindsiclava antealesidota is an extinct species of sea snail, a marine gastropod mollusc in the family Pseudomelatomidae, the turrids and allies.

== Distribution ==
Fossils of this marine species were found in Pliocene strata in Florida, United States; age range: 3.6 to 2.588 Ma.
