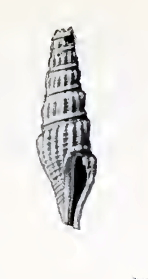
- Original image of a shell of Hindsiclava eupora

Scientific classification
- Kingdom: Animalia
- Phylum: Mollusca
- Class: Gastropoda
- Subclass: Caenogastropoda
- Order: Neogastropoda
- Superfamily: Conoidea
- Family: Pseudomelatomidae
- Genus: Hindsiclava
- Species: H. eupora

Binomial name
- Hindsiclava eupora (W. H. Dall, 1915)

Synonyms
- † Crassispira (Hindsiclava) eupora (W.H. Dall, 1915); † Drillia eupora W. H. Dall, 1915 (original combination)

= Hindsiclava eupora =

Extinct species of gastropod

Hindsiclava eupora is an extinct species of sea snail, a marine gastropod mollusc in the family Pseudomelatomidae, the turrids and allies.

== Description ==
The five whorls have a height of 16 mm and a maximum diameter 5.75 mm.

The small, slender shell is elongate. It contains more than 6 flattish whorls (specimen decollate). The suture is distinct, separated from the fasciole in front by an elevated spiral ridge, carinated and beveled from the carina to the suture which is slightly undulated by the ribs. The anal fasciole is excavated and spirally faintly striated, especially on the anterior slope. The axial sculpture consists of (on the body whorl) about 20 sharp low straight narrow ribs, with much wider interspaces, and extending from the shoulder to the siphonal canal. The spiral sculpture between the sutures consists of 4 fine elevated threads, including 1 at the shoulder and a fifth on which the suture is laid, with wider flat interspaces. On the body whorl, there are 14 or 15 equal and equally spaced similar threads. The aperture is narrow. The wide anal sulcus is shallow. The outer lip is defective. The rather narrow siphonal canal is long and straight. The columella and the body shows a rather thick smooth layer of callus.

== Distribution ==
Fossils of this marine species were found in Miocene strata in Colombia and in Oligocene to Miocene strata in Florida, United States; age range: 23.03 to 20.43 Ma.
