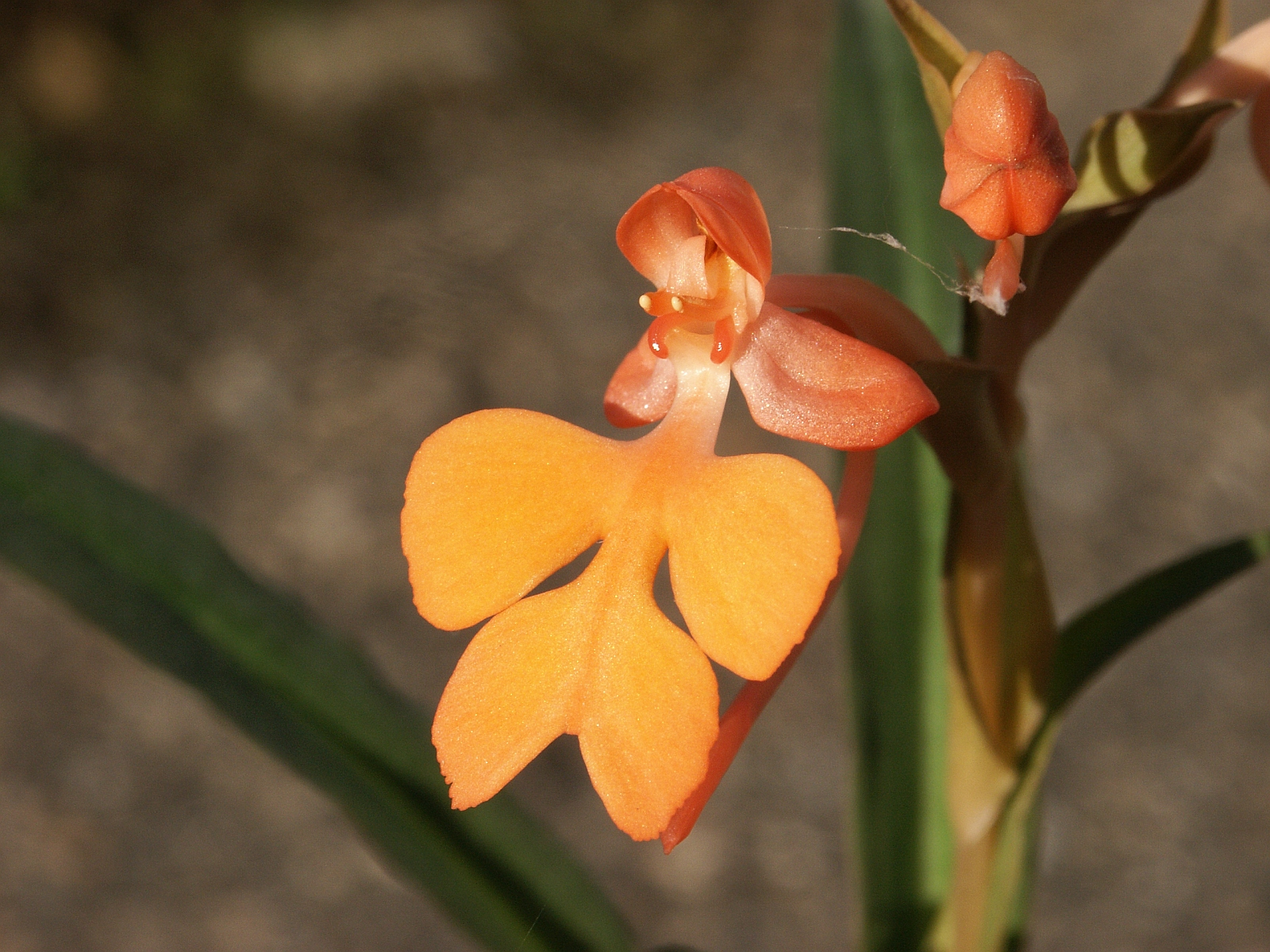

Conservation status
- CITES Appendix II

Scientific classification
- Kingdom: Plantae
- Clade: Tracheophytes
- Clade: Angiosperms
- Clade: Monocots
- Order: Asparagales
- Family: Orchidaceae
- Subfamily: Orchidoideae
- Genus: Habenaria
- Species: H. rhodocheila

Binomial name
- Habenaria rhodocheila Hance

Subspecies
- Habenaria rhodocheila subsp. philippinensis (Ames) Christenson; Habenaria rhodocheila subsp. rhodocheila

Synonyms
- Smithanthe rhodochelia (Hance) Szlach. & Marg.; Pecteilis rhodocheila (Hance) M.A.Clem. & D.L.Jones; subsp. philippinensis: Habenaria militaris var. philippinensis Ames; Smithanthe rhodochelia subsp. philippinensis (Ames) Szlach. & Marg.; Pecteilis rhodocheila subsp. philippinensis (Ames) Cootes; subsp. rhodocheila: Habenaria pusilla Rchb.f.; Habenaria militaris Rchb.f.; Habenaria xanthocheila Ridl.; Habenaria roebelenii Rolfe; Smithanthe erichmichaelii (Christenson) Szlach. & Marg.; Habenaria erichmichelii Christenson

= Habenaria rhodocheila =

Species of orchid

Habenaria rhodocheila is a species of orchid that occurs from South China to peninsular Malaysia and the Philippines.
