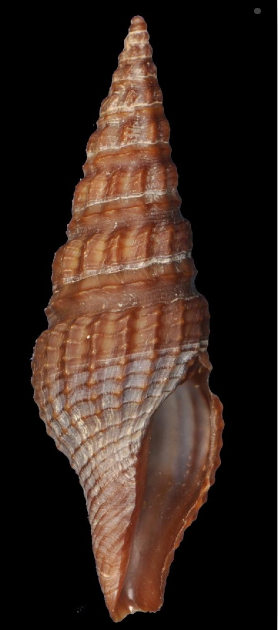
- Shell of Crassispira chazaliei (specimen at MNHN, Paris)

Scientific classification
- Kingdom: Animalia
- Phylum: Mollusca
- Class: Gastropoda
- Subclass: Caenogastropoda
- Order: Neogastropoda
- Superfamily: Conoidea
- Family: Pseudomelatomidae
- Genus: Crassispira
- Species: C. chazaliei

Binomial name
- Crassispira chazaliei (Dautzenberg, 1900)

Synonyms
- Crassispira anthamilla (Melvill, 1923); Drillia anthamilla Melvill, 1923; Drillia chazaliei Dautzenberg, 1900; Hindsiclava chazaliei (Dautzenberg, 1900)

= Crassispira chazaliei =

Species of gastropod

Crassispira chazaliei is a species of sea snail, a marine gastropod mollusk in the family Pseudomelatomidae.

== Description ==
The length of the shell varies between 25 mm and 43 mm.

The shell has a narrowly fusiform shape. Its surface is rather dull and blackish-fuscous. It contains 11 whorls, of which the apical are smooth, shining, apparently carinate centrally, but the type specimen is a little worn and imperfect in this particular. The lower whorls are suturally impressed just below the sutures, at the summit of each whorl, once spirally acutely keeled, the remaining portion being rather ventricose, longitudinally obliquely multicostate, crossed by, on the four penultimate whorls, three to five spiral revolving lines, gemmulate at the several points of junction with the ribs. The gemmules are shining, often pale. The body whorl possesses fourteen such lirae, with over twenty closely grained ribs. The aperture is narrow and oblong. The outer lip is not effuse, columellar nearly straight, the sinus shallow, but well expressed. The siphonal canal is slightly recurved.

== Distribution ==
This species occurs in the Caribbean Sea from Panama to Suriname
