= Hindsiclava ignorata =

Scientific classification
- Kingdom: Animalia
- Phylum: Mollusca
- Class: Gastropoda
- Subclass: Caenogastropoda
- Order: Neogastropoda
- Superfamily: Conoidea
- Family: Pseudomelatomidae
- Genus: Hindsiclava
- Species: H. ignorata

Binomial name
- Hindsiclava ignorata Frassinetti, D.; Covacevich, V. 1995

Extinct species of gastropod

Hindsiclava ignorata is an extinct species of sea snail, a marine gastropod mollusc in the family Pseudomelatomidae, the turrids and allies.

== Distribution ==
Fossils of this marine species were found in Upper Pliocene strata in Chile.
