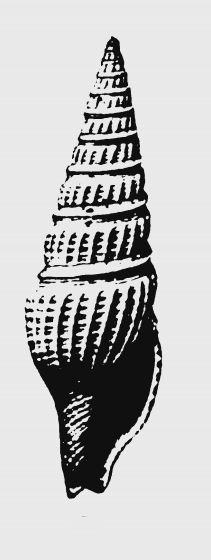
- Original image of a shell of † Hindsiclava paraconsors

Scientific classification
- Kingdom: Animalia
- Phylum: Mollusca
- Class: Gastropoda
- Subclass: Caenogastropoda
- Order: Neogastropoda
- Superfamily: Conoidea
- Family: Pseudomelatomidae
- Genus: Hindsiclava
- Species: H. paraconsors

Binomial name
- Hindsiclava paraconsors (J. Gardner, 1938)

Synonyms
- † Crassispira calligona paraconsors J. Gardner, 1938

= Hindsiclava paraconsors =

Extinct species of gastropod

Hindsiclava paraconsors is an extinct species of sea snail, a marine gastropod mollusc in the family Pseudomelatomidae, the turrids and allies.

== Description ==
The length of the shell attains 30 mm, its diameter 9 mm.

(Original description) The slender, turreted shell is rather large for the group. The body whorl and the spire almost equal in altitude. The shell contains 10 whorls. The protoconch is broken but small and smooth, probably paucispiral. The adult sculpture reticulate. There are15 axials on the early whorls of the spire, increasing to 24 on the body. They are narrow, sharp, uniformly elevated from the posterior fasciole to the anterior suture and well down upon the base of the body. The spirals are low, regularly spaced fillets overriding the costals. They number 4 on the medial whorls, a fifth appearing directly behind the anterior suture near the body, 15 upon the body whorl. Secondaries are regularly intercalated and, on the body. Tertiaries occur fortuitously. The anterior fasciole is very finely threaded. The posterior fasciole is broad, concave, sharply delimited both by its concavity and the abrupt disappearance of the axials. A prominent cord shows in front of the suture. There are three or four sharp spirals between the cord and the anterior margin of the fasciole and a few irregular filaments between the cord and the closely appressed posterior margin. The suture line is undulated in harmony with the axials. The aperture is narrow and lanceolate. The outer lip is imperfect, not thickened within. The sinus is moderately deep, placed midway between the sutural cord and the anterior margin of the fasciole. The outer lip is obliquely constricted at the base of the body. The parietal wash is thin. The anterior canal is relatively long and slender.

== Distribution ==
Fossils of this marine species were found in Middle Miocene strata in the Chippola Formation, Florida, United States.
