= Dichomeris ignorata =

Scientific classification
- Kingdom: Animalia
- Phylum: Arthropoda
- Class: Insecta
- Order: Lepidoptera
- Family: Gelechiidae
- Genus: Dichomeris
- Species: D. ignorata

Binomial name
- Dichomeris ignorata Meyrick, 1921

Species of moth

Dichomeris ignorata is a moth in the family Gelechiidae. It was described by Edward Meyrick in 1921. It is found on Java in Indonesia.

The wingspan is about 14 mm (0.55 in). The forewings are dark fuscous, slightly pale speckled, and the hindwings are grey.
