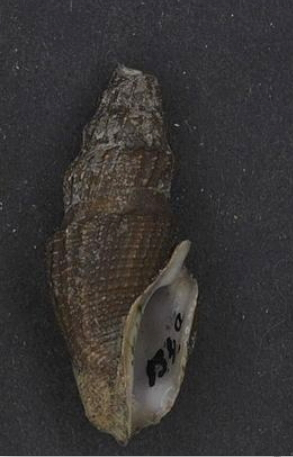
- Shell of Crassispira callosa (specimen at Naturalis Biodiversity Center)

Scientific classification
- Kingdom: Animalia
- Phylum: Mollusca
- Class: Gastropoda
- Subclass: Caenogastropoda
- Order: Neogastropoda
- Superfamily: Conoidea
- Family: Pseudomelatomidae
- Genus: Crassispira
- Species: C. callosa

Binomial name
- Crassispira callosa (Kiener, 1840)

Synonyms
- Pleurotoma callosa Kiener, 1840; Pleurotoma (Crassispira) callosa (Kiener, 1840)

= Crassispira callosa =

Species of gastropod

Crassispira callosa is a species of sea snail, a marine gastropod mollusk in the family Pseudomelatomidae.

== Description ==
The length of the shell varies between 35 mm and 50 mm.

The chocolate-colored shell is very solid, with a well-defined shoulder, and sulcate space above it. The longitudinal ribs lare ow, rounded, closer than in Crassispira bottae. The interspaces are very narrow, crossed by raised revolving lines.

== Distribution ==
This species occurs in the Atlantic Ocean from Senegal to Angola
