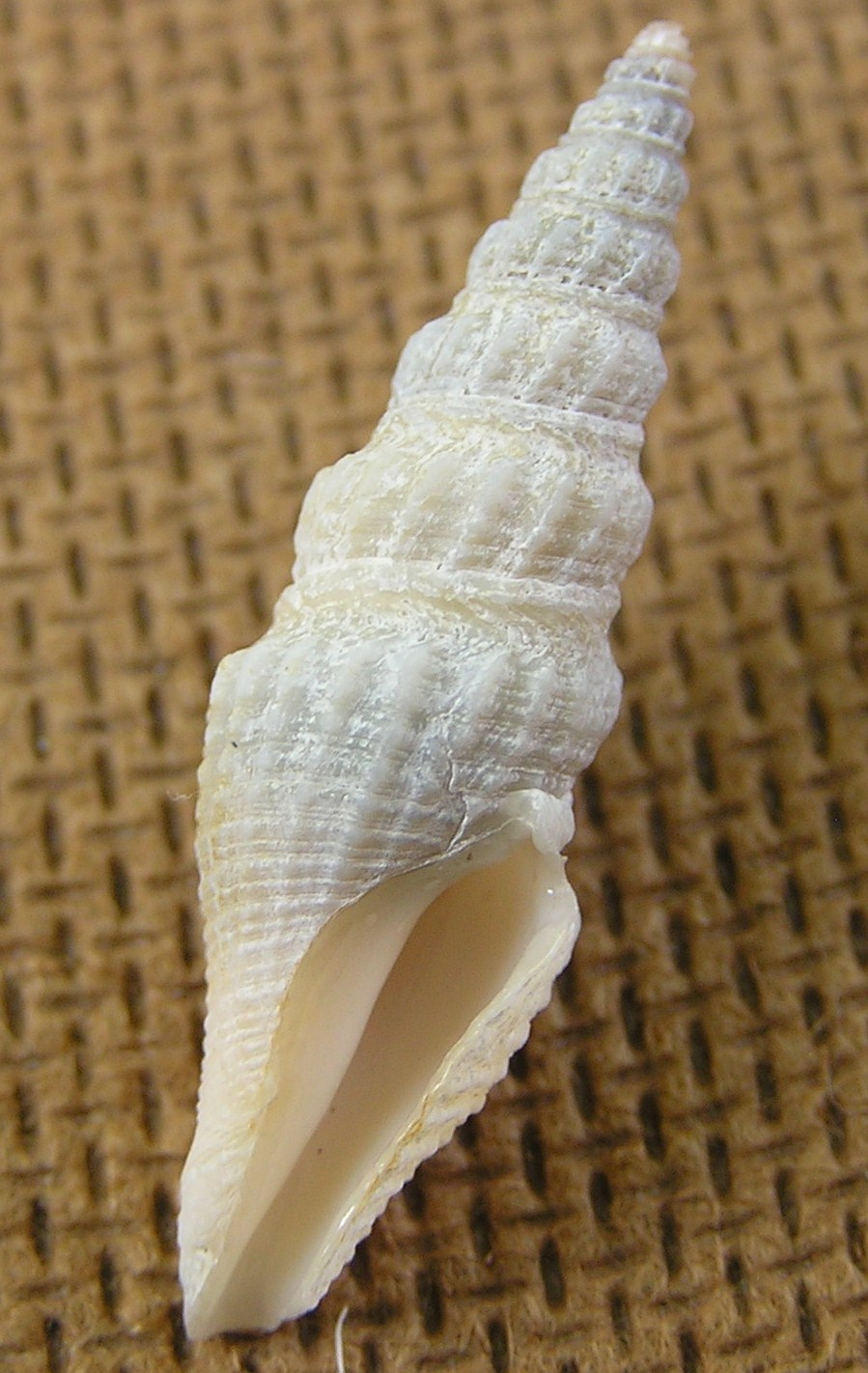
- Apertural view of a shell of Hindsiclava militaris

Scientific classification
- Kingdom: Animalia
- Phylum: Mollusca
- Class: Gastropoda
- Subclass: Caenogastropoda
- Order: Neogastropoda
- Superfamily: Conoidea
- Family: Pseudomelatomidae
- Genus: Hindsiclava
- Species: H. militaris

Binomial name
- Hindsiclava militaris (Reeve, 1843)

Synonyms
- Clavitula militaris Hinds, 1843; Drillia militaris "Hinds" Tryon, 1884; Pleurotoma militaris Reeve, 1843; Pleurotoma (Drillia) militaris Reeve, Weinkauf, 1887; ? Turris (Surcula) resina Dall, 1908

= Hindsiclava militaris =

Species of gastropod

Hindsiclava militaris is a species of sea snail, a marine gastropod mollusk in the family Pseudomelatomidae.

== Description ==
The length of the shell varies between 25 mm and 50 mm.

The acuminately turreted shell is yellowish white, sometimes stained with brown. The whorls are decussated with nodulous longitudinal ridges and spiral striae. The upper part of the whorls are concave, edged with a slightly nodulous keel.

== Distribution ==
This marine species occurs from Baja California, Mexico to Colombia. Fossils have been found in Late Neogene strata of Ecuador.
