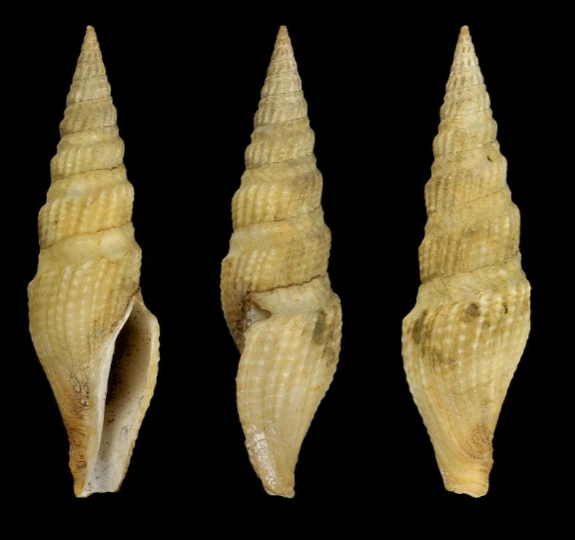
- Shell of Hindsiclava alesidota (holotype at the Smithsonian Institution)

Scientific classification
- Kingdom: Animalia
- Phylum: Mollusca
- Class: Gastropoda
- Subclass: Caenogastropoda
- Order: Neogastropoda
- Superfamily: Conoidea
- Family: Pseudomelatomidae
- Genus: Hindsiclava
- Species: H. alesidota

Binomial name
- Hindsiclava alesidota (Dall, 1889)

Synonyms
- Drillia alesidota Dall, 1889

= Hindsiclava alesidota =

Species of gastropod

Hindsiclava alesidota, common name the lean turris, is a species of sea snail, a marine gastropod mollusc in the family Pseudomelatomidae, the turrids.

== Description ==
The length of the shell varies between 20 mm and 53 mm.

(Original description) The large, slender shell is ashy brown or light brown, pointed, and rudely sculptured. It contains 10 whorls, with a protoconch of about two whorls, round, small, glassy, smooth, and inflated. The fasciole is slightly concave, nearly smooth, very steep, separated from the suture by a smoothish space, and marginated by a slightly raised thread. The suture is appressed. The spiral sculpture consists of numerous subequal little elevated revolving threads with wider interspaces. They are strongest on the summit of the riblets and faint in the interspaces. There are about five in front of the fasciole and between it and the next suture. They are fainter on the siphonal canal. The transverse sculpture consists of numerous (on the penultimate whorl 28) narrow, little elevated, slightly oblique riblets, beginning and strongest at the fasciole, and passing over the whorl to fade away on the base. The thin margin of the suture is sometimes undulated by passing over them. The aperture is narrow and long. The notch is rounded and not deep. The outer lip is simple, thin, arched forward, and not constricted for the siphonal canal. The inner lip is simple and shows a slight callus, thicker at the posterior angle opposite the notch. The columella is straight, attenuated, and somewhat twisted in front. The siphonal canal is wide and slightly recurved.

== Distribution ==
This marine species occurs between North Carolina and Texas, United States; and off Barbados and French Guiana.
