= Militaris =

Militaris may refer to:

- Via Militaris, an ancient Roman road
- Vir militaris, a Roman legate that governed a consular military province of the Roman Empire

== See also ==
- Militari
