= Hoya ignorata =

Scientific classification
- Kingdom: Plantae
- Clade: Tracheophytes
- Clade: Angiosperms
- Clade: Eudicots
- Clade: Asterids
- Order: Gentianales
- Family: Apocynaceae
- Genus: Hoya
- Species: H. ignorata

Binomial name
- Hoya ignorata T.B.Tran, Rodda, Simonsson & Joongku Lee (2011)

Synonyms
- Hiepia corymbosa V.T.Pham & Aver. (2011)

Genus of plants

Hoya ignorata is a species of flowering plant in the dogbane family Apocynaceae. It is an epiphytic shrub native to Vietnam, Thailand, Peninsular Malaysia, and Borneo.

Hiepia corymbosa V.T.Pham & Aver. is a synonym for the species. The genus name of Hiepia is in honour of Tiên Hiêp Nguyên (b. 1947), a Vietnamese botanist, who organized field research excursions in south-east Asia. The Latin specific epithet of corymbosa refers to Corymb, which is derived from the Ancient Greek word korymbos meaning "bunch of flowers or fruit". Hiepia and Hiepia corymbosa were first described and published in Turczaninowia Vol.14, Issue 3 on page 6 in 2011.
