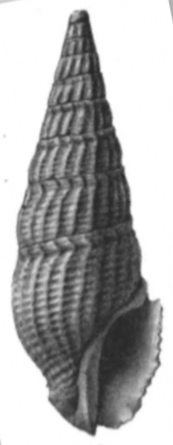
- Shell of Crassispira perrugata

Scientific classification
- Kingdom: Animalia
- Phylum: Mollusca
- Class: Gastropoda
- Subclass: Caenogastropoda
- Order: Neogastropoda
- Superfamily: Conoidea
- Family: Pseudomelatomidae
- Genus: Crassispira
- Species: C. perrugata

Binomial name
- Crassispira perrugata (Dall, 1890)

Synonyms
- † Drillia abundans perrugata Dall, 1890

= Crassispira perrugata =

Extinct species of gastropod

Crassispira perrugata is an extinct species of sea snail, a marine gastropod mollusk in the family Pseudomelatomidae, the turrids and allies.

== Description ==
The length of the shell attains 29.5 mm, its diameter is 9.5 mm.

== Distribution ==
Fossils have been found in Quaternary strata in Florida and North Carolina, United States; age range: 2.588 to 0.781 Ma
