= Crassispira lyopleura =

Scientific classification
- Kingdom: Animalia
- Phylum: Mollusca
- Class: Gastropoda
- Subclass: Caenogastropoda
- Order: Neogastropoda
- Superfamily: Conoidea
- Family: Pseudomelatomidae
- Genus: Crassispira
- Species: C. lyopleura

Binomial name
- Crassispira lyopleura McNeil, 1984

Extinct species of gastropod

Crassispira lyopleura is an extinct species of sea snail, a marine gastropod mollusk in the family Pseudomelatomidae, the turrids and allies.

== Description ==
The length of the shell attains 17 mm.

== Distribution ==
Fossils have been found in Oligocene strata in Mississippi, United States.
