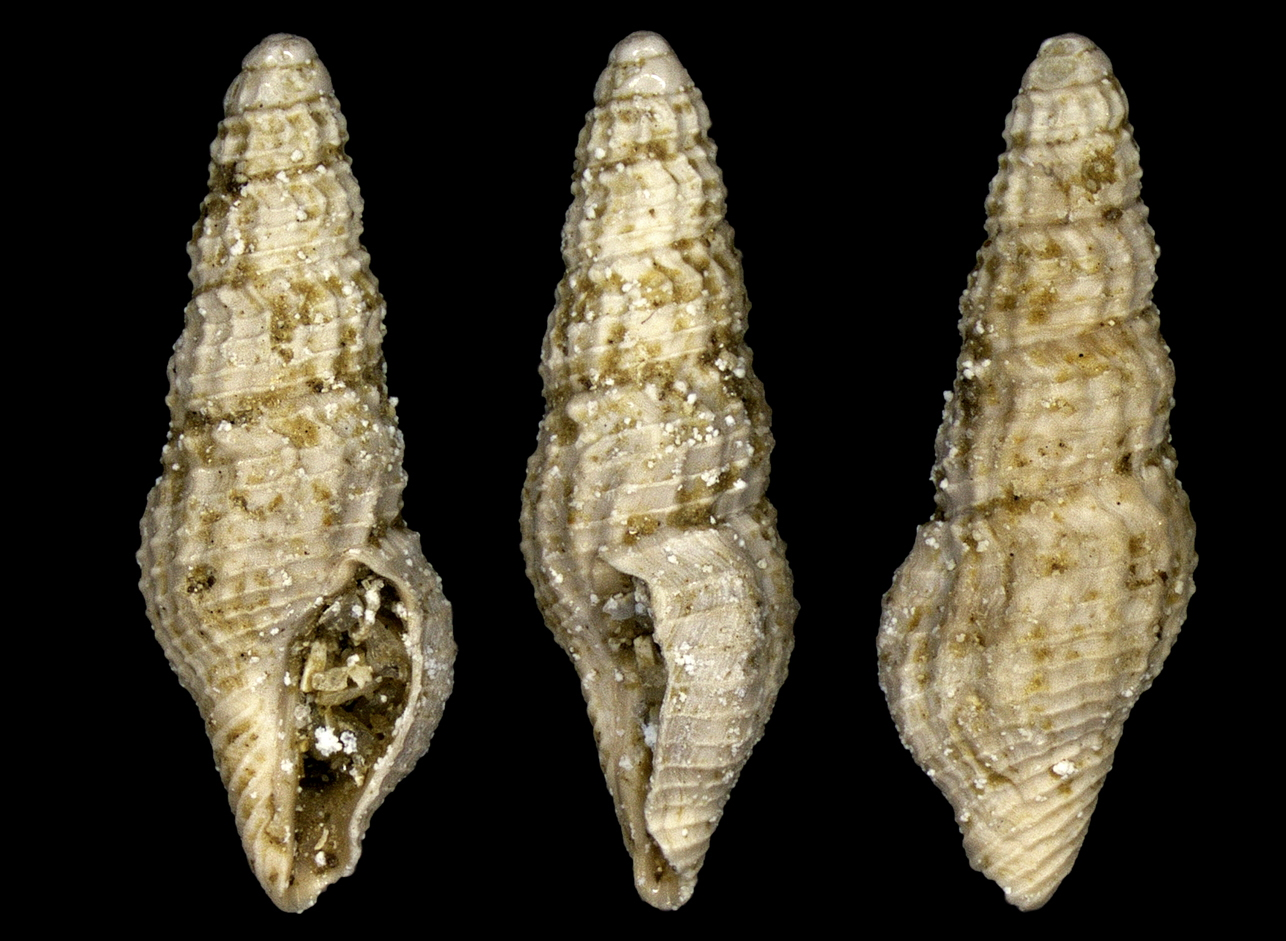
- Shells of Crassispira erronea (syntype at MNHN, Paris)

Scientific classification
- Kingdom: Animalia
- Phylum: Mollusca
- Class: Gastropoda
- Subclass: Caenogastropoda
- Order: Neogastropoda
- Superfamily: Conoidea
- Family: Pseudomelatomidae
- Genus: Crassispira
- Species: C. erronea

Binomial name
- Crassispira erronea (Cossmann, 1902)

Synonyms
- † Drillia (Crassispira) erronea Cossmann, 1902

= Crassispira erronea =

Extinct species of gastropod

Crassispira erronea is an extinct species of sea snail, a marine gastropod mollusk in the family Pseudomelatomidae, the turrids and allies.

== Distribution ==
Fossils have been found in Eocene strata in Loire Atlantique, France.
