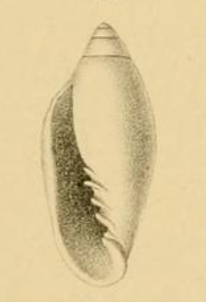
- Drawing of a shell of Volvarina eurychilus (holotype)

Scientific classification
- Kingdom: Animalia
- Phylum: Mollusca
- Class: Gastropoda
- Subclass: Caenogastropoda
- Order: Neogastropoda
- Family: Marginellidae
- Subfamily: Marginellinae
- Genus: Volvarina
- Species: †V. eurychilus

Binomial name
- †Volvarina eurychilus (Cossmann, 1892)

Synonyms
- † Marginella eurychilus Cossmann, 1892 superseded combination

= Volvarina eurychilus =

Species of gastropod

Volvarina eurychilus is an extinct species of sea snail, a marine gastropod mollusk in the family Marginellidae, the margin snails.

== Description ==
The length of the shell attains 7.5 mm, its diameter 3.5 mm.

(Original description in French) The narrow and elongated shell is slightly compressed. It is oliviform, with a very short whorl, terminating in an obtuse apex. The shell consists of four subulate whorls, barely convex, separated by an inconspicuous suture. The body whorl is very large, depressed and subangular posteriorly, where a narrow ramp surmounts the suture and attenuated anteriorly, where it terminates in a fairly wide truncation of the siphonal canal, which is not indented. The aperture is elongated, with almost parallel lips, occupying more than two-thirds and almost three-quarters of the total height. The outer lip is bordered by a very wide and flat bead, which goes up to the suture of the penultimate whorl and which circumvents the anterior truncation of the siphonal canal. The outer lip is vertical, sinuous, slightly indented on the posterior side. The columellar margin is thin and widely spreading, provided with five slightly thick and decreasing plaits: the first in front is flattened and forms the continuation of the rim of the lip, the fifth behind is thin and more sunken than the others.

== Distribution ==
Fossils of this marine species were found in Eocene strata in Paris Basin, France.
