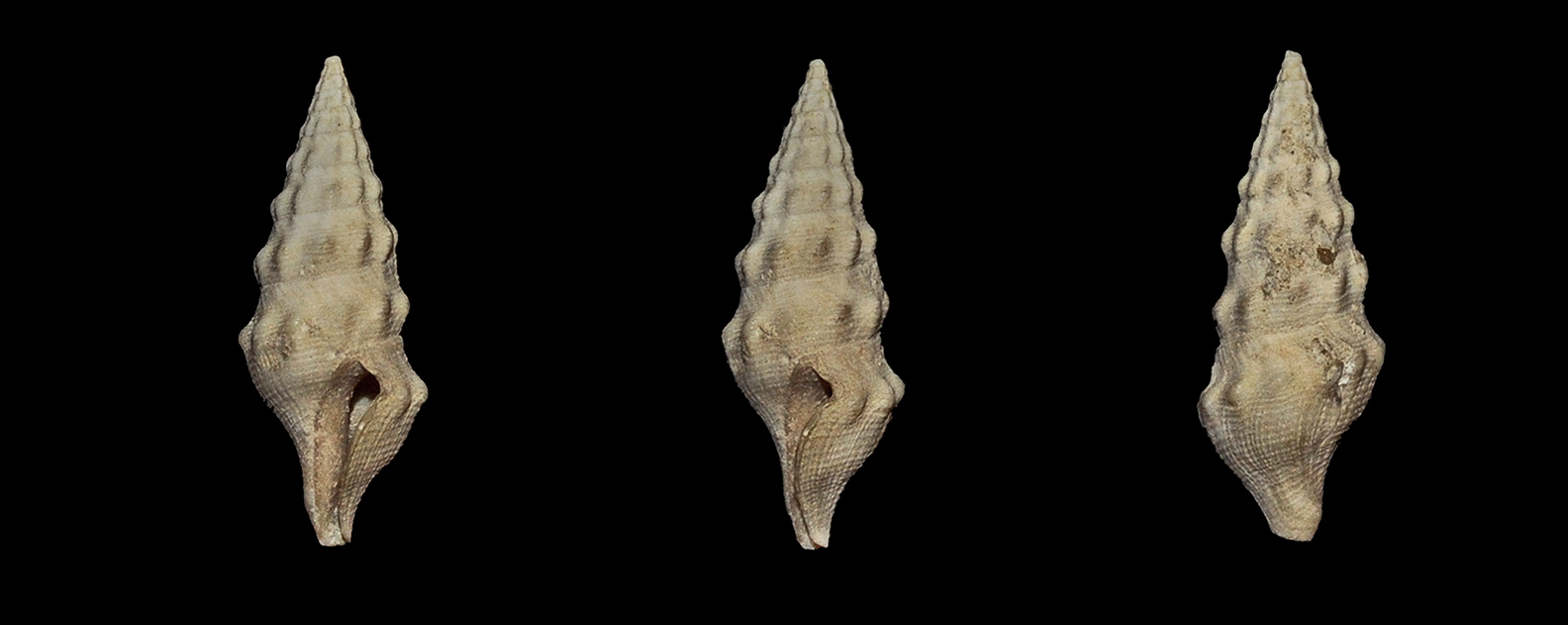
- Shells of Crassispira obliquata (specimen at MNHN, Paris)

Scientific classification
- Kingdom: Animalia
- Phylum: Mollusca
- Class: Gastropoda
- Subclass: Caenogastropoda
- Order: Neogastropoda
- Superfamily: Conoidea
- Family: Pseudomelatomidae
- Genus: Crassispira
- Species: C. obliquata

Binomial name
- Crassispira obliquata (Cossmann, 1889)

Synonyms
- † Drillia obliquata Cossmann, 1889

= Crassispira obliquata =

Extinct species of gastropod

Crassispira obliquata is an extinct species of sea snail, a marine gastropod mollusk in the family Pseudomelatomidae, the turrids and allies.

== Description ==
The length of the shell attains 20 mm.

== Distribution ==
Fossils have been found in Eocene strata in the Paris Basin, France.
