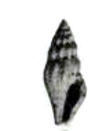
- Original image of a shell of † Mangelia gouetensis

Scientific classification
- Kingdom: Animalia
- Phylum: Mollusca
- Class: Gastropoda
- Subclass: Caenogastropoda
- Order: Neogastropoda
- Superfamily: Conoidea
- Family: Mangeliidae
- Genus: Mangelia
- Species: M. gouetensis

Binomial name
- Mangelia gouetensis A.E.M. Cossmann, 1896

Synonyms
- † Mangilia gouetensis A.E.M. Cossmann, 1896

= Mangelia gouetensis =

Extinct species of gastropod

Mangelia gouetensis is an extinct species of sea snail, a marine gastropod mollusk in the family Mangeliidae.

The species was named after the Bois-Gouêt, where it was found.

== Description ==
The length of the shell attains 6.5 mm, its diameter 2.75 mm.

The small shell has a fusiform shape. The rather short shell contains 6 convex whorls, separated by a deep and undulating suture. They show 12 thick and rounded axial ribs between the sutures, but not succeeding each other from one whorl to the next. They are crossed by spiral cords that do not protrude much. The body whorl measures two-thirds of the total length of the shell. The siphonal canal is short. The aperture is oval. The outer lip is oblique, thickened by the last rib with a notch above the suture. The columellar margin is thin and narrow.

== Distribution ==
This extinct marine species was found in Eocene strata of Brittany, France.
