= Crassispira toulai =

Scientific classification
- Kingdom: Animalia
- Phylum: Mollusca
- Class: Gastropoda
- Subclass: Caenogastropoda
- Order: Neogastropoda
- Superfamily: Conoidea
- Family: Pseudomelatomidae
- Genus: Crassispira
- Species: C. toulai

Binomial name
- Crassispira toulai (Cossmann, 1913)

Synonyms
- † Drillia (Crassispira) toulai Cossmann, 1913

Extinct species of gastropod

Crassispira toulai is an extinct species of sea snail, a marine gastropod mollusk in the family Pseudomelatomidae, the turrids and allies.

== Distribution ==
Fossils have been found in Miocene strata in Martinique.
