= Crassispira propeangulosa =

Scientific classification
- Kingdom: Animalia
- Phylum: Mollusca
- Class: Gastropoda
- Subclass: Caenogastropoda
- Order: Neogastropoda
- Superfamily: Conoidea
- Family: Pseudomelatomidae
- Genus: Crassispira
- Species: C. propeangulosa

Binomial name
- Crassispira propeangulosa (Cossmann, 1889)

Synonyms
- † Crassispira (Tripia) propeangulosa (Cossmann, 1889)

Extinct species of gastropod

Crassispira propeangulosa is an extinct species of sea snail, a marine gastropod mollusk in the family Pseudomelatomidae, the turrids and allies. Fossils have been found in Eocene strata in Picardy, France.
