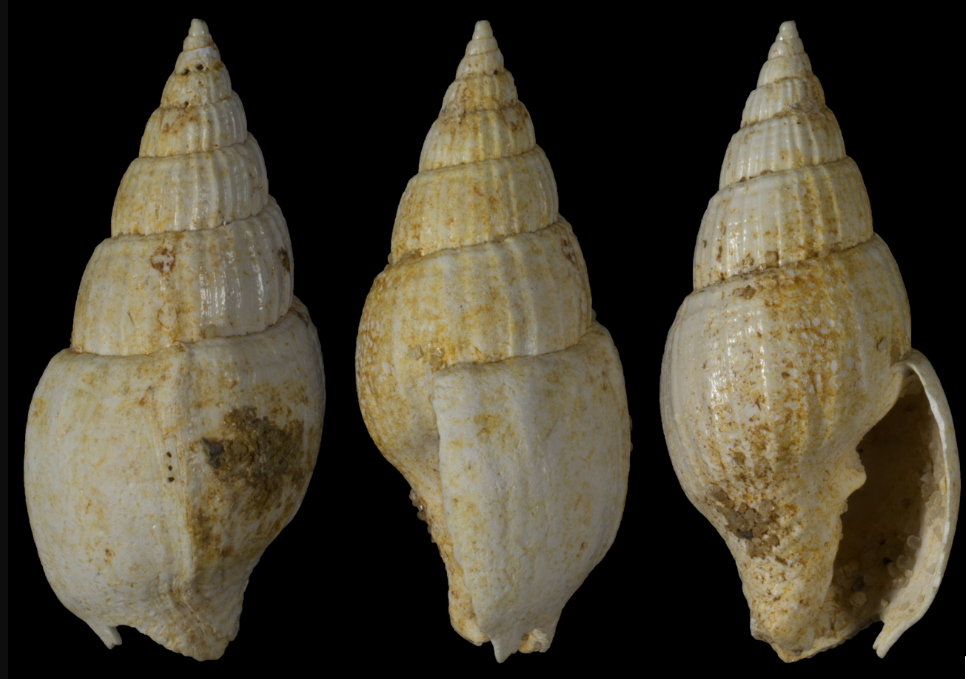
- Shell of † Vexillum bouryi (specimen at MNHN, Paris)

Scientific classification
- Kingdom: Animalia
- Phylum: Mollusca
- Class: Gastropoda
- Subclass: Caenogastropoda
- Order: Neogastropoda
- Superfamily: Turbinelloidea
- Family: Costellariidae
- Genus: Vexillum
- Species: †V. bouryi

Binomial name
- †Vexillum bouryi (Cossmann, 1889)

Synonyms
- † Mitra bouryi Cossmann, 1889 > superseded combination; † Turricula (Fusimitra) bouryi (Cossmann, 1889); † Vexillum (Uromitra) bouryi (Cossmann, 1889) superseded combination

= Vexillum bouryi =

Species of gastropod

Vexillum bouryi is an extinct species of sea snail, a marine gastropod mollusk in the family Costellariidae, the ribbed miters.

== Description ==
The length of the shell attains 18 mm, its diameter 7 mm.

== Distribution ==
Fossils of this marine species were found in Eocene strata in Ile-de-France, France.
