= Raphitoma ganensis =

Scientific classification
- Kingdom: Animalia
- Phylum: Mollusca
- Class: Gastropoda
- Subclass: Caenogastropoda
- Order: Neogastropoda
- Family: Raphitomidae
- Genus: Raphitoma
- Species: R. ganensis

Binomial name
- Raphitoma ganensis (Cossmann, 1923)

Synonyms
- Turricula (Crenaturricula) ganensis (Cossmann, 1923)

Extinct species of gastropod

Raphitoma ganensis is an extinct species of sea snail, a marine gastropod mollusc in the family Raphitomidae.

== Description ==
The length of the shell can reach between 9mm to 25mm of size. Within the Conoidea, the Raphitomidae are one of the most difficult family to describe by shell morphology only. Indeed, none of the external characteristics or group of characteristics shared by all the genera of this family is peculiar enough to be of any use in a description.

== Distribution ==
Fossils of this extinct marine species were found in Eocene strata in Aquitaine, France
