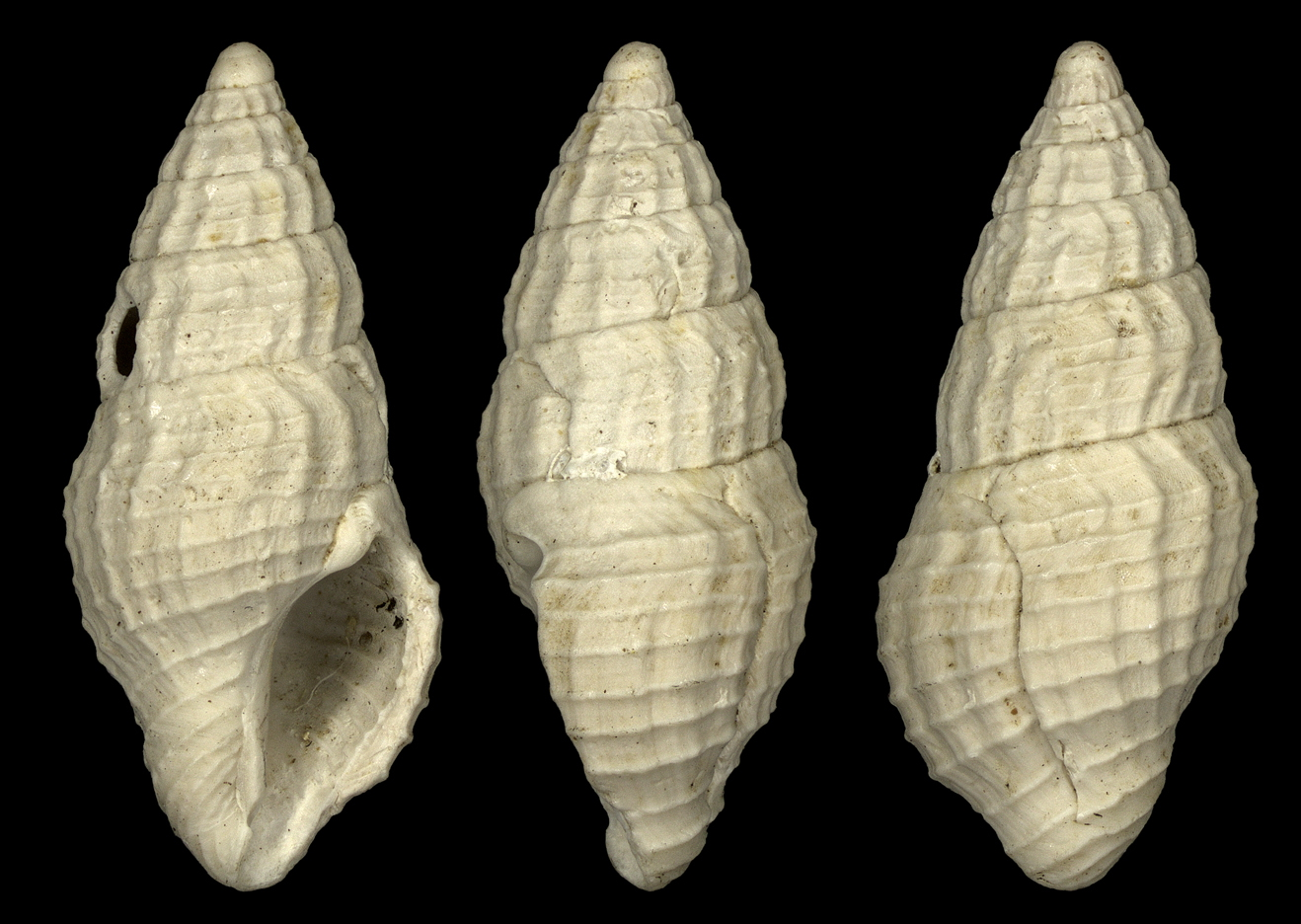
- Shells of † Crassispira labroplicata (holotype at MNHN, Paris)

Scientific classification
- Kingdom: Animalia
- Phylum: Mollusca
- Class: Gastropoda
- Subclass: Caenogastropoda
- Order: Neogastropoda
- Superfamily: Conoidea
- Family: Pseudomelatomidae
- Genus: Crassispira
- Species: C. labroplicata

Binomial name
- Crassispira labroplicata (Cossmann, 1896)

Synonyms
- † Drillia (Crassispira) labroplicata Cossmann, 1896

= Crassispira labroplicata =

Extinct species of gastropod

Crassispira labroplicata is an extinct species of sea snail, a marine gastropod mollusk in the family Pseudomelatomidae, the turrids and allies.

== Distribution ==
Fossils have been found in Eocene strata in Loire-Atlantique, France
