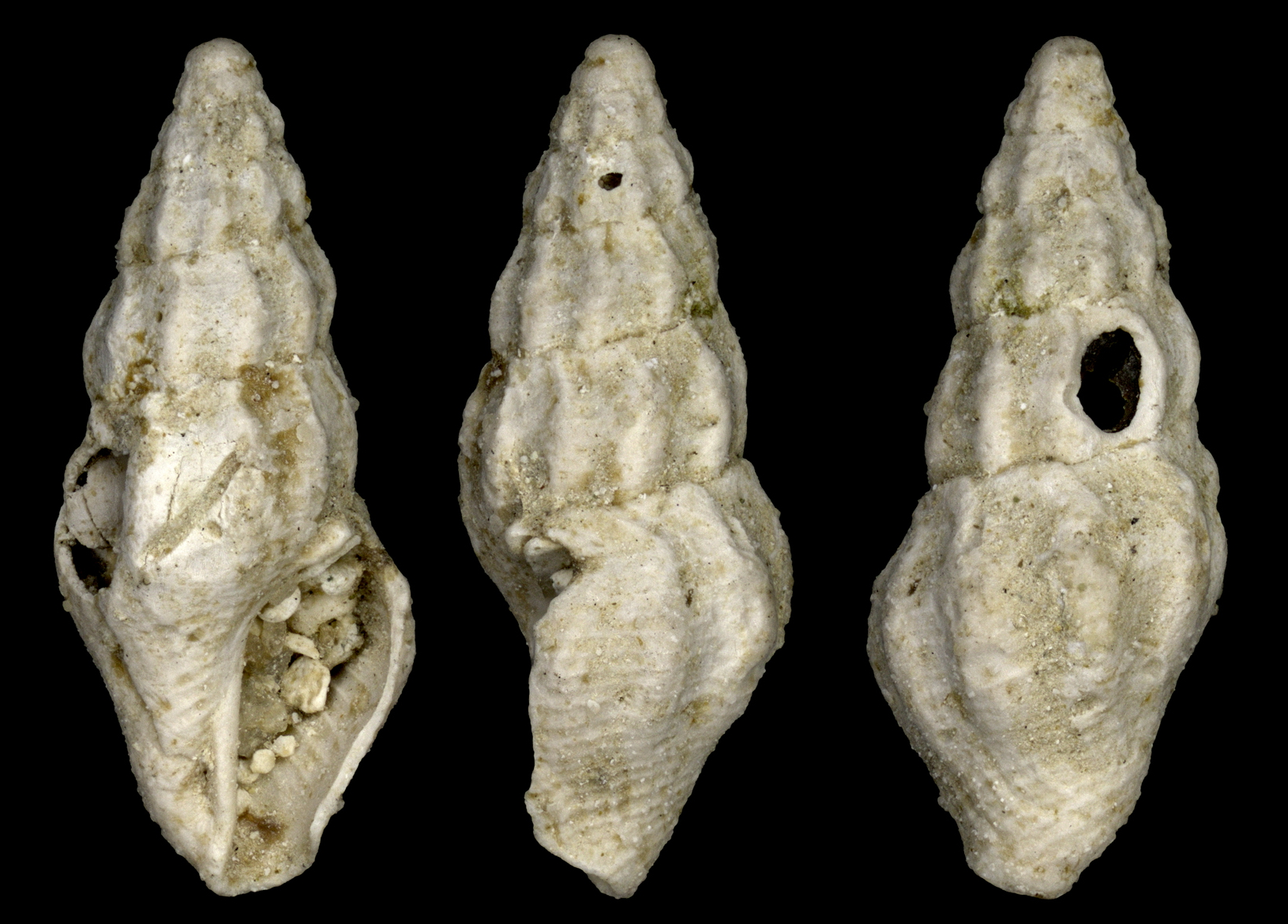
- Shells of † Crassispira vasseuri (paratype at MNHN, Paris)

Scientific classification
- Kingdom: Animalia
- Phylum: Mollusca
- Class: Gastropoda
- Subclass: Caenogastropoda
- Order: Neogastropoda
- Superfamily: Conoidea
- Family: Pseudomelatomidae
- Genus: Crassispira
- Species: C. vasseuri

Binomial name
- Crassispira vasseuri (Cossmann, 1896)

Synonyms
- † Drillia (Crassispira) vasseuri Cossmann, 1896

= Crassispira vasseuri =

Extinct species of gastropod

Crassispira vasseuri is an extinct species of sea snail, a marine gastropod mollusk in the family Pseudomelatomidae, the turrids and allies. Fossils have been found in Eocene strata in Loire-Atlantique, France.
