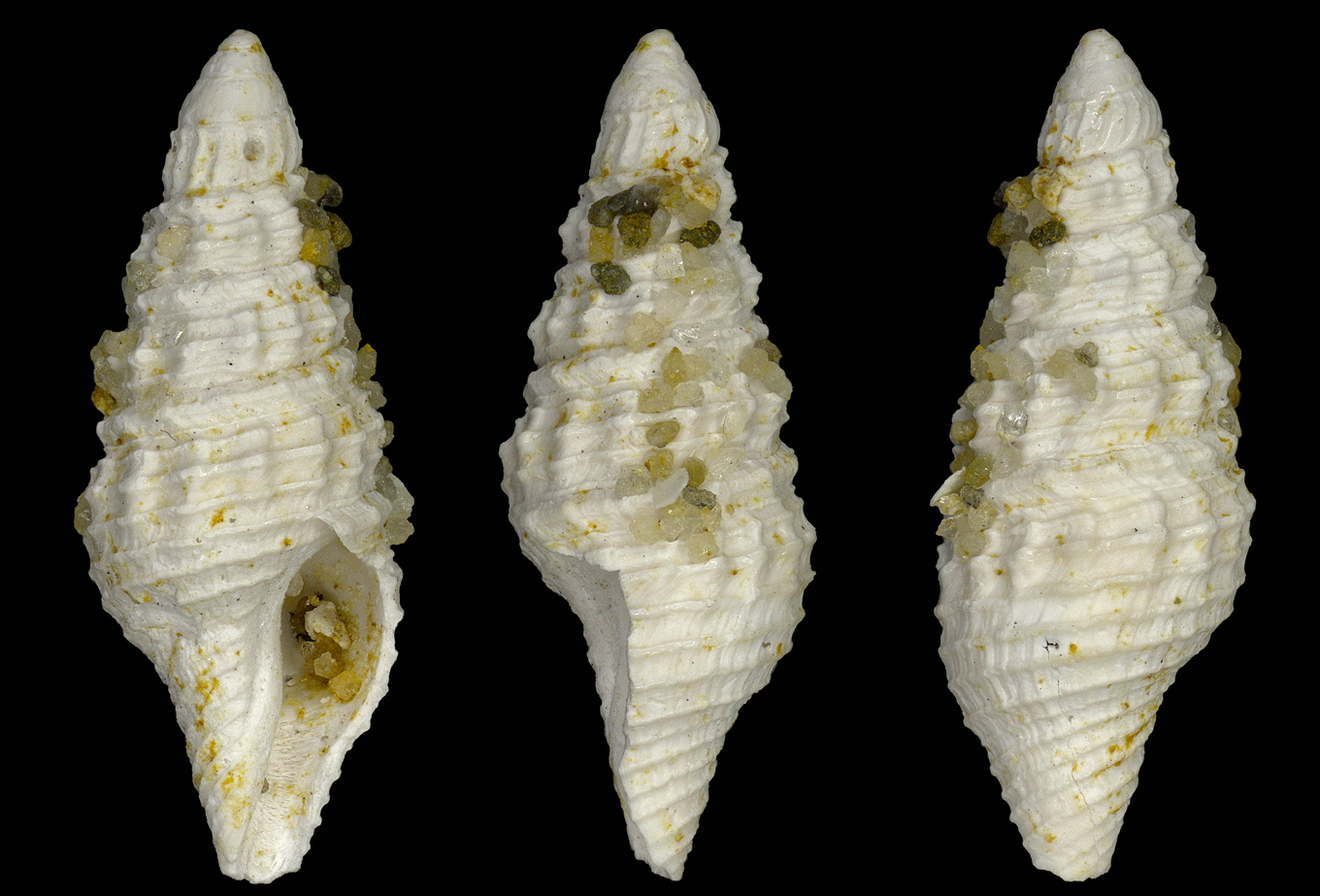
- Shells of Crassispira mausseneti (specimen at MNHN, Paris)

Scientific classification
- Kingdom: Animalia
- Phylum: Mollusca
- Class: Gastropoda
- Subclass: Caenogastropoda
- Order: Neogastropoda
- Superfamily: Conoidea
- Family: Pseudomelatomidae
- Genus: Crassispira
- Species: C. mausseneti

Binomial name
- Crassispira mausseneti (Cossmann, 1889)

Synonyms
- † Drillia (Crassispira) mausseneti Cossmann, 1889

= Crassispira mausseneti =

Extinct species of gastropod

Crassispira mausseneti is an extinct species of sea snail, a marine gastropod mollusk in the family Pseudomelatomidae, the turrids and allies.

== Description ==
The length of the shell attains 5 mm and a diameter of 2 mm. It lived in marine environments.

"Small, short shell, with a conoid and obtuse apex, composed of slightly convex whorls, slightly excavated at the back, separated by a suture accompanied by a prominent and almost smooth rim, adorned with small curved ribs crenellating four prominent cords and giving the surface a rough appearance that persists on the last whorl; this is almost equal to half the length, attenuated at the base, which bears four or five smooth and spaced keels, crossed by fine and sinuous folds; opening small, rounded; canal wide and short, barely inflected."

== Distribution ==
Fossils have been found in Eocene strata in the Paris Basin, France.
