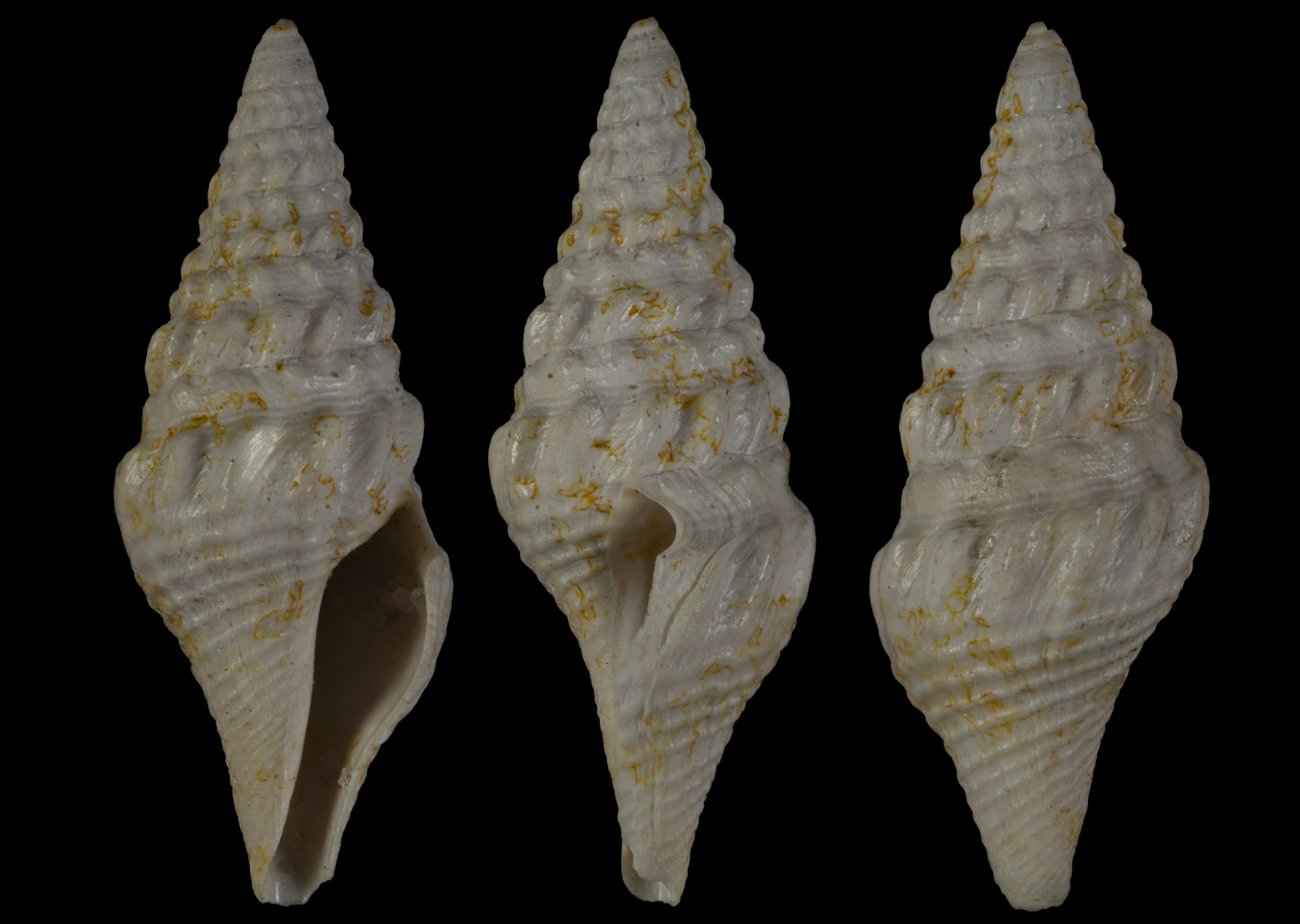
- Shells of Crassispira contabulata (syntype at MNHN, Paris)

Scientific classification
- Kingdom: Animalia
- Phylum: Mollusca
- Class: Gastropoda
- Subclass: Caenogastropoda
- Order: Neogastropoda
- Superfamily: Conoidea
- Family: Pseudomelatomidae
- Genus: Crassispira
- Species: C. contabulata

Binomial name
- Crassispira contabulata (Cossmann, 1889)

Synonyms
- † Drillia (Crassispira) contabulata (Cossmann, 1889); † Pleurotoma (Oxyacrum) contabulata Cossmann, 1889

= Crassispira contabulata =

Extinct species of gastropod

Crassispira contabulata is an extinct species of sea snail, a marine gastropod mollusk in the family Pseudomelatomidae, the turrids and allies.

== Description ==
The length of the shell attains 11 mm.

== Distribution ==
Fossils have been found in Eocene strata in the Paris Basin, France.
