= Vexillum boutillieri =

Scientific classification
- Kingdom: Animalia
- Phylum: Mollusca
- Class: Gastropoda
- Subclass: Caenogastropoda
- Order: Neogastropoda
- Family: Costellariidae
- Genus: Vexillum
- Species: †V. boutillieri

Binomial name
- †Vexillum boutillieri (Cossmann, 1889)

Synonyms
- † Mitra boutillieri Cossmann, 1889 superseded combination; † Vexillum (Uromitra) boutillieri (Cossmann, 1889)

Species of gastropod

Vexillum boutillieri is an extinct species of sea snail, a marine gastropod mollusk, in the family Costellariidae, the ribbed miters.

== Description ==
The length of the shell attains 11.5 mm, its diameter is 4.5 mm.

== Distribution ==
Fossils of this marine species were found in Eocene strata in Ile-de-France, France.
