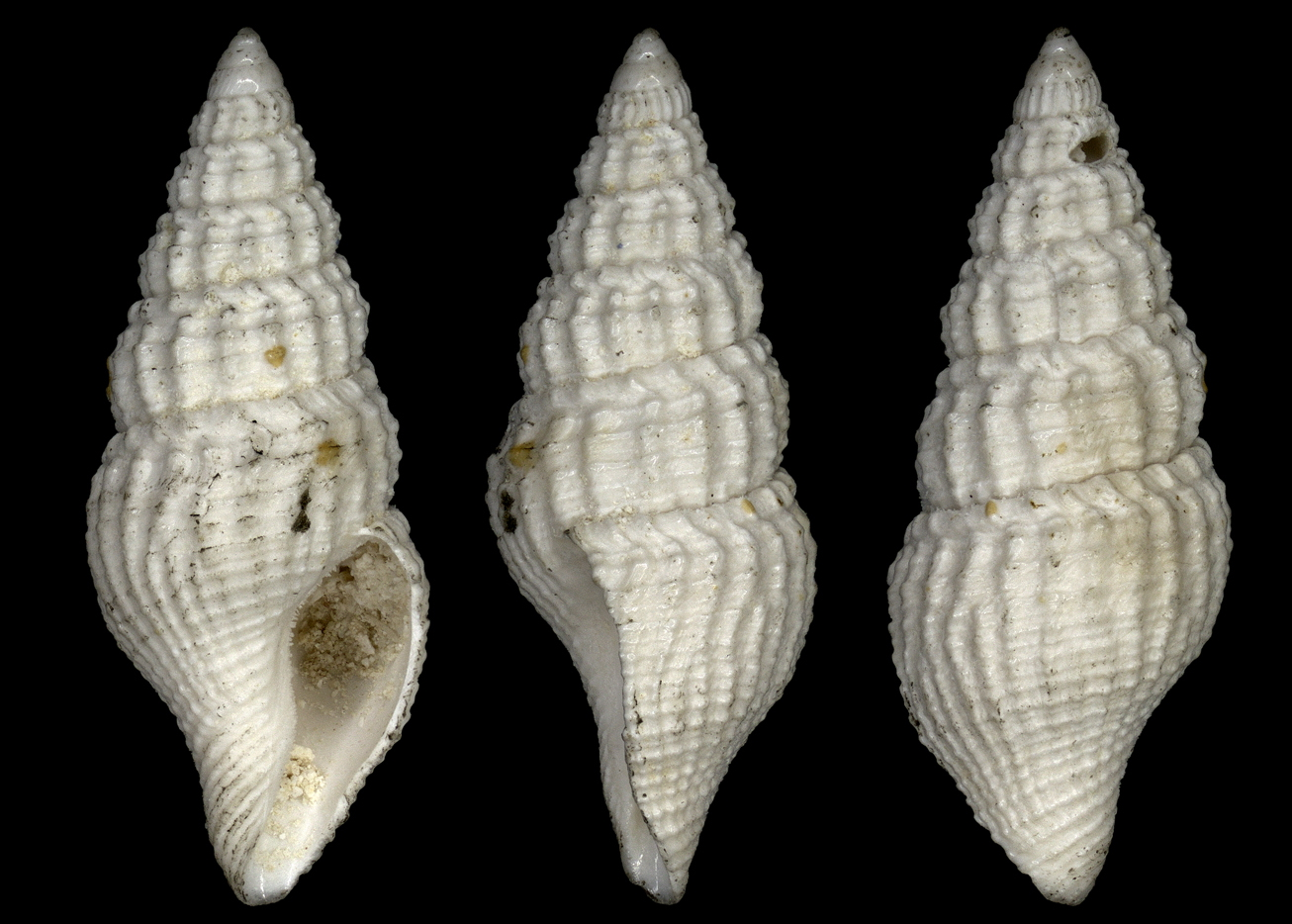
- Shells of Crassispira oxyacrum (specimen at MNHN, Paris)

Scientific classification
- Kingdom: Animalia
- Phylum: Mollusca
- Class: Gastropoda
- Subclass: Caenogastropoda
- Order: Neogastropoda
- Superfamily: Conoidea
- Family: Pseudomelatomidae
- Genus: Crassispira
- Species: C. oxyacrum

Binomial name
- Crassispira oxyacrum (Cossmann, 1889)

Synonyms
- Crassispira (Tripla) oxyacrum (Cossmann, 1889); † Drillia (Tripla) oxyacrum Cossmann, 1889

= Crassispira oxyacrum =

Extinct species of gastropod

Crassispira oxyacrum is an extinct species of sea snail, a marine gastropod mollusk in the family Pseudomelatomidae, the turrids and allies.

== Description ==
The length of the shell attains 7 mm; its diameter 2 mm.

(Original description in French) The shell is small and spindle-shaped, with a smooth, conical apex culminating in a minute point. In addition to the embryonic whorls, six convex whorls are present, each displaying a subtle angularity. These whorls are adorned with small, oblique ribs that curve backward towards the right, forming a row of bead-like structures along the lower suture. These ribs are further embellished by five prominent, alternating cords, particularly noticeable at the base of the shell, where the ribs often bifurcate. The body whorl constitutes approximately half the total shell length. The siphonal canal is very short, relatively wide, and twisted. The columella exhibits a slight callus, and the outer lip is notched near the suture.

== Distribution ==
Fossils have been found in Eocene strata in the Paris Basin, France.
