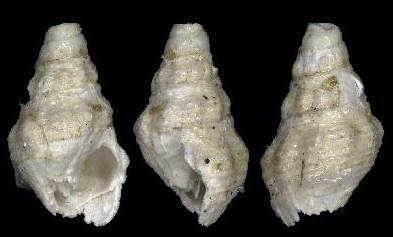
- Shell of Raphitoma sapicurtensis (holotype at MNHN, Paris)

Scientific classification
- Kingdom: Animalia
- Phylum: Mollusca
- Class: Gastropoda
- Subclass: Caenogastropoda
- Order: Neogastropoda
- Superfamily: Conoidea
- Family: Raphitomidae
- Genus: Raphitoma
- Species: †R. sapicurtensis

Binomial name
- †Raphitoma sapicurtensis Cossmann, 1902

= Raphitoma sapicurtensis =

Extinct species of gastropod

Raphitoma fischeri is an extinct species of sea snail, a marine gastropod mollusc in the family Raphitomidae.

== Distribution ==
Fossils of this extinct marine species were found in Eocene strata in France.
