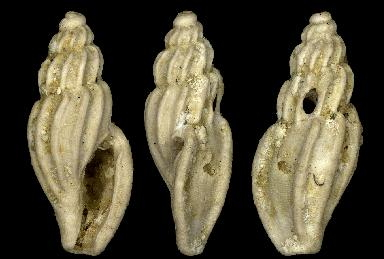
- Shell of † Mangelia labratula (syntype at MNHN, Paris)

Scientific classification
- Kingdom: Animalia
- Phylum: Mollusca
- Class: Gastropoda
- Subclass: Caenogastropoda
- Order: Neogastropoda
- Superfamily: Conoidea
- Family: Mangeliidae
- Genus: Mangelia
- Species: M. labratula

Binomial name
- Mangelia labratula A.E.M. Cossmann, 1889

Synonyms
- † Mangilia labratula A.E.M. Cossmann, 1889

= Mangelia labratula =

Extinct species of gastropod

Mangelia labratula is an extinct species of sea snail, a marine gastropod mollusk in the family Mangeliidae.

== Description ==
The length of the shell attains 4 mm..

== Distribution ==
This extinct marine species was found in Eocene strata of the Paris Basin, France.
