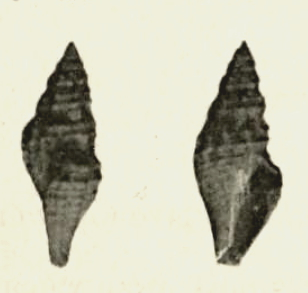
- Original image of a shell of Raphitoma diozodes

Scientific classification
- Kingdom: Animalia
- Phylum: Mollusca
- Class: Gastropoda
- Subclass: Caenogastropoda
- Order: Neogastropoda
- Superfamily: Conoidea
- Family: Raphitomidae
- Genus: Raphitoma
- Species: †R. diozodes

Binomial name
- †Raphitoma diozodes Cossmann, 1898

= Raphitoma diozodes =

Extinct species of gastropod

Raphitoma diozodes is an extinct species of sea snail, a marine gastropod mollusc in the family Raphitomidae.

== Description ==
The length of the shell reaches 7.5 mm, its diameter 3 mm.

(Original description) The small shell has a narrow and slender shape. The rather long spire shows a conical shape. The protoconch is polygynous, conoidal, with convex whorls and a pointed apex. The teleoconch contains six whorls. The first one is convex and finely ribbed. The others are biangular, the height of which exceeds half the width. They are separated by linear and wavy sutures, ornated with thick ribs, spaced apart, forming two knots crenellated by the two angles which share the height in three equal spaces. There is only spiral nets on the body whorl, the two upper regions are smooth. The body whorl measures more than five-eighths of the total length. It is ovally attenuated at the base, on which sinuous ribs extend, crossed by an alternating reticulation, which tightens by winding around the siphonal canal. The aperture is very narrow, with almost parallel edges, truncated by the siphonal canal. The outer lip is straight. The columella is slightly callous and almost straight.

== Distribution ==
Fossils of this extinct marine species were found in Eocene strata in Brittany, France
