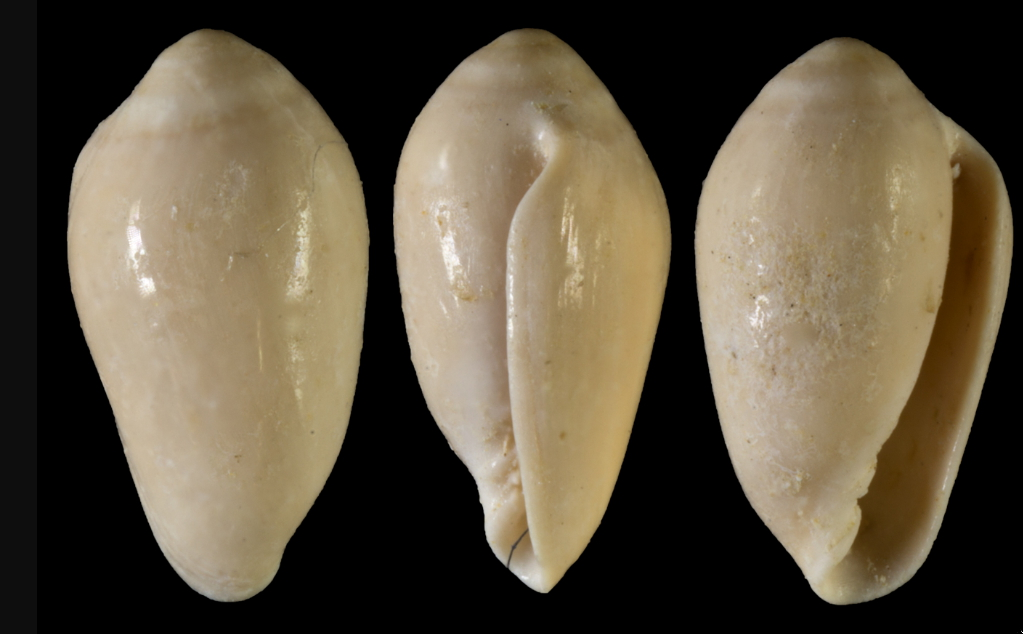
- Shell of Volvarina bouryi (specimen at MNHN, Paris)

Scientific classification
- Kingdom: Animalia
- Phylum: Mollusca
- Class: Gastropoda
- Subclass: Caenogastropoda
- Order: Neogastropoda
- Family: Marginellidae
- Subfamily: Marginellinae
- Genus: Volvarina
- Species: †V. bouryi

Binomial name
- †Volvarina bouryi (Cossmann, 1889)

Synonyms
- † Marginella bouryi Cossmann, 1889 ·

= Volvarina bouryi =

Species of gastropod

Volvarina bouryi is an extinct species of sea snail, a marine gastropod mollusk in the family Marginellidae, the margin snails.

== Description ==
The length of the shell attains 2 mm, its diameter 1 mm.

This is a very small and narrow shell, coniform or subcylindrical. The very short spire consists of subulate whorls, separated by indistinct sutures. The body whorl is very large, olivoid and attenuated in front. The aperture is narrowed in the middle by the contraction of the outer lip which folds up a little inside, although it is not very thick. The columella contains four folds.

== Distribution ==
Fossils of this marine species were found in Eocene strata in Paris Basin, France.
