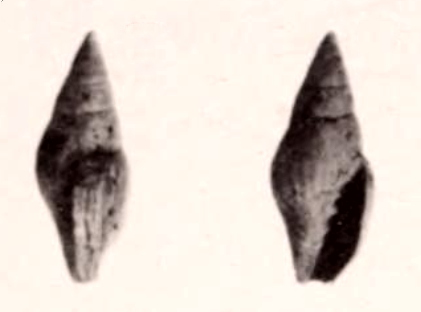
- Shell of † Vexillum hemigymnum (holotype)

Scientific classification
- Kingdom: Animalia
- Phylum: Mollusca
- Class: Gastropoda
- Subclass: Caenogastropoda
- Order: Neogastropoda
- Superfamily: Turbinelloidea
- Family: Costellariidae
- Genus: Vexillum
- Species: †V. hemigymnum

Binomial name
- †Vexillum hemigymnum (Cossmann & Pissarro, 1901)

Synonyms
- † Turricula hemigymna Cossmann & Pissarro, 1901 superseded combination; † Vexillum (Costellaria) hemigymnum (Cossmann & Pissarro, 1901) superseded combination

= Vexillum hemigymnum =

Species of gastropod

Vexillum hemigymnum is an extinct species of sea snail, a marine gastropod mollusk, in the family Costellariidae, the ribbed miters.

== Description ==
The length of the shell attains 13 mm, and its diameter is 5 mm.

The fairly slender shell is rather short. The short spire is curved and conical. The protoconch is smooth and consists of 1½ whorls. The teleoconch consists of five narrow, almost flat whorls, separated by shallow sutures, adorned with small oblique costules at the lower part. These straighten up abruptly and cover the entire surface of the towers. The body whorl is rather big and equal to two-thirds of the total height. The base of the shell is excavated, on which the ribs persist until this excavation, leaving a smooth area towards the lower quarter of the body whorl. The aperture is wide, dilated in front, terminated by a very wide, not indented siphonal canal. The outer lip is slender, slightly convex, notched at its lower part and not wrinkled inside. The columella has four plaits, located in the middle of the columella, the two anterior are slender and oblique, the two posterior ones thicker and horizontal. The columellar border shows a callus and is almost straight.

== Distribution ==
Fossils of this marine species were found in Eocene strata in Cotentin, France.
