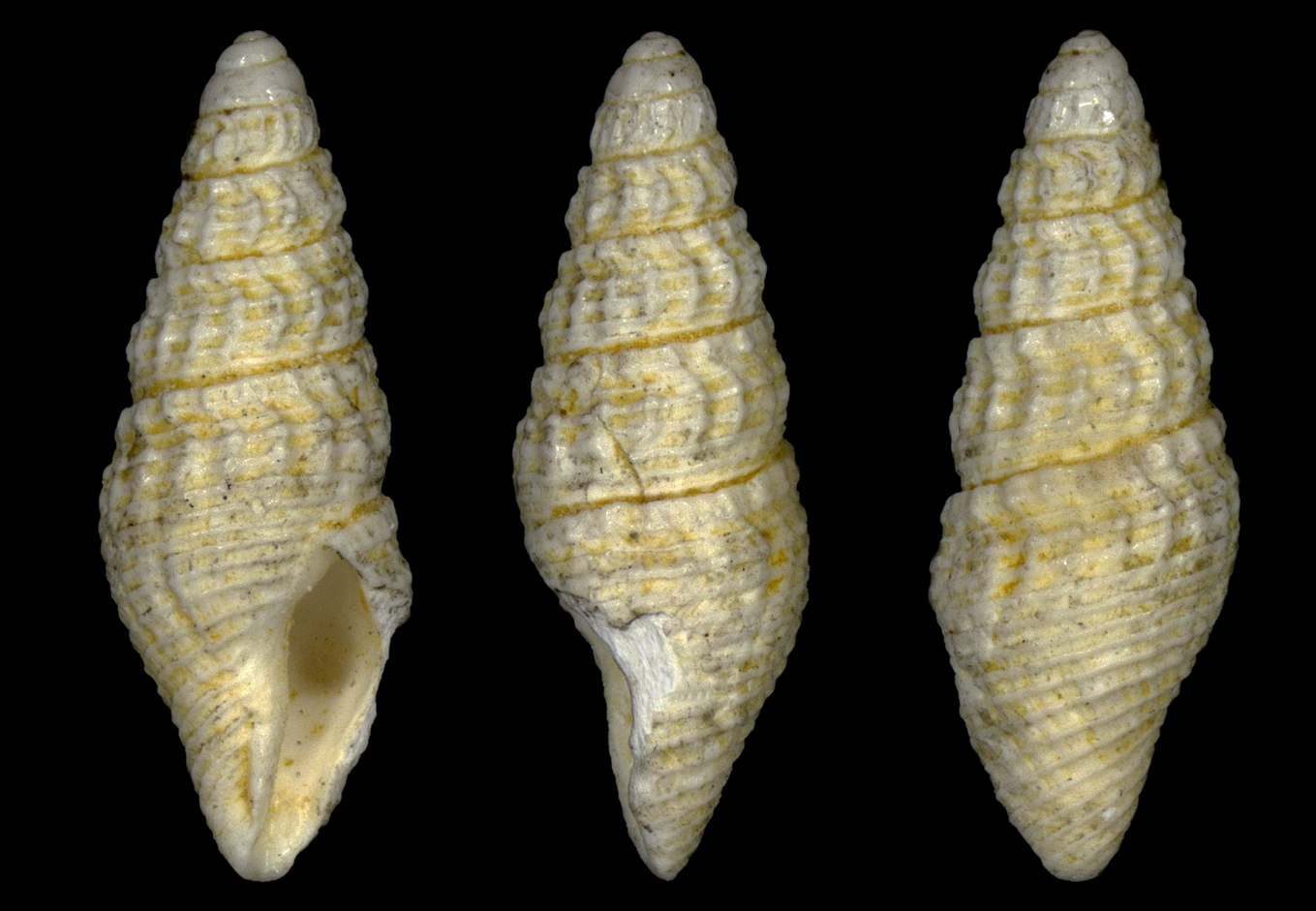
- Shells of Crassispira grignonensis (specimens at MNHN, Paris)

Scientific classification
- Kingdom: Animalia
- Phylum: Mollusca
- Class: Gastropoda
- Subclass: Caenogastropoda
- Order: Neogastropoda
- Superfamily: Conoidea
- Family: Pseudomelatomidae
- Genus: Crassispira
- Species: C. grignonensis

Binomial name
- Crassispira grignonensis (Cossmann, 1889)

Synonyms
- † Crassispira (Tripia) grignonensis (Cossmann, 1889)

= Crassispira grignonensis =

Extinct species of gastropod

Crassispira grignonensis is an extinct species of sea snail, a marine gastropod mollusk in the family Pseudomelatomidae, the turrids and allies.

== Distribution ==
Fossils have been found in Eocene strata in the Ile-de-France, France.
