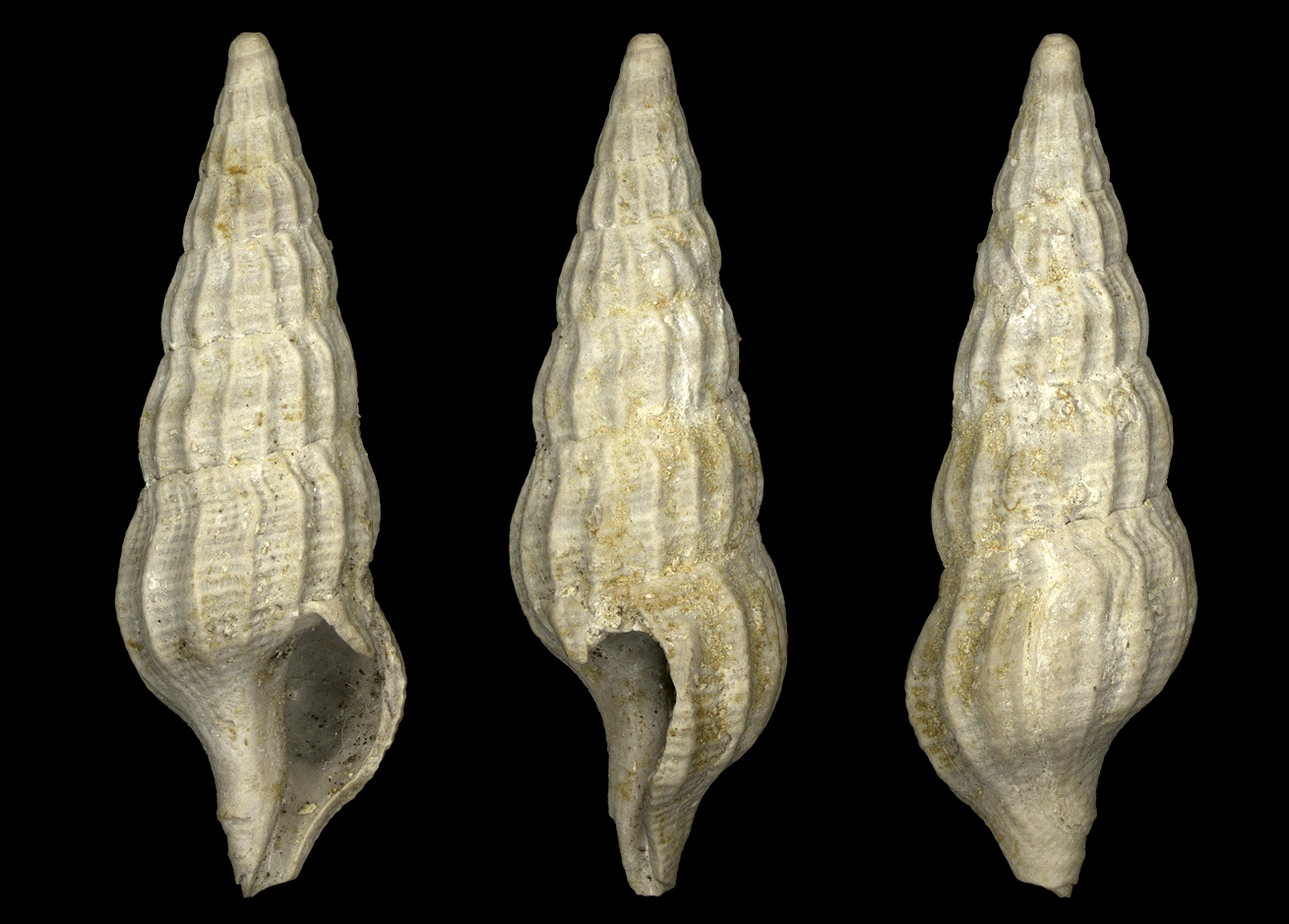
- Shells of † Crassispira ischnomorpha (paratype at MNHN, Paris)

Scientific classification
- Kingdom: Animalia
- Phylum: Mollusca
- Class: Gastropoda
- Subclass: Caenogastropoda
- Order: Neogastropoda
- Superfamily: Conoidea
- Family: Pseudomelatomidae
- Genus: Crassispira
- Species: C. ischnomorpha

Binomial name
- Crassispira ischnomorpha (Cossmann & Pissarro, 1900)

Synonyms
- † Drillia (Crassispira) ischnomorpha Cossmann & Pissarro, 1900

= Crassispira ischnomorpha =

Extinct species of gastropod

Crassispira glaphyrella is an extinct species of sea snail, a marine gastropod mollusk in the family Pseudomelatomidae, the turrids and allies. Fossils have been found in Eocene strata in Lower Normandy, France.
