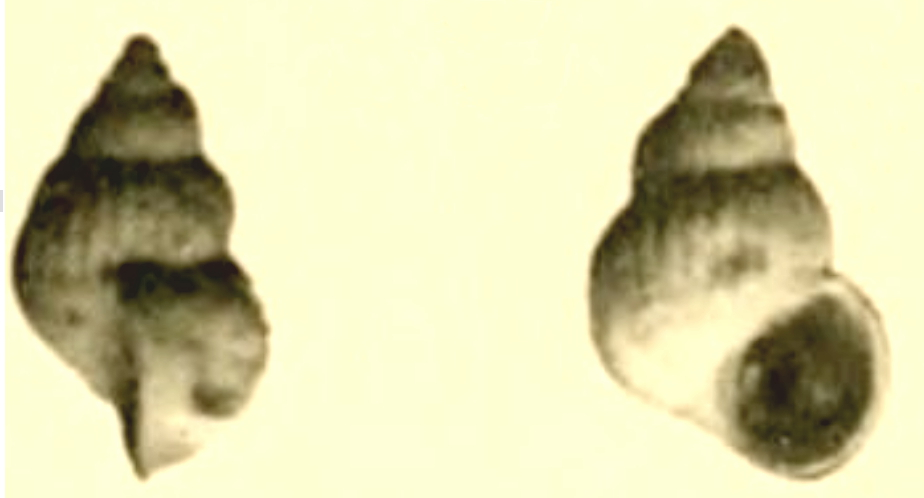
- Shell of Alvania houdasi (holotype)

Scientific classification
- Kingdom: Animalia
- Phylum: Mollusca
- Class: Gastropoda
- Subclass: Caenogastropoda
- Order: Littorinimorpha
- Superfamily: Rissooidea
- Family: Rissoidae
- Genus: Alvania
- Species: †A. houdasi

Binomial name
- †Alvania houdasi (Cossmann, 1921)

Synonyms
- † Rissoa houdasi Cossmann, 1907

= Alvania houdasi =

Species of gastropod

Alvania houdasi is an extinct species of minute sea snail, a marine gastropod mollusc or micromollusk in the family Rissoidae.

== Description ==
The length of the shell attains 2.5 mm, its diameter is 1 mm.

== Distribution ==
Fossils of this species were found in Eocene strata in Île-de-France, France.
