= Chatsworth Formation =

Cretaceous geologic formation in Southern California

- Stratigraphic range: Campanian & Maestrichtian epochs of Cretaceous
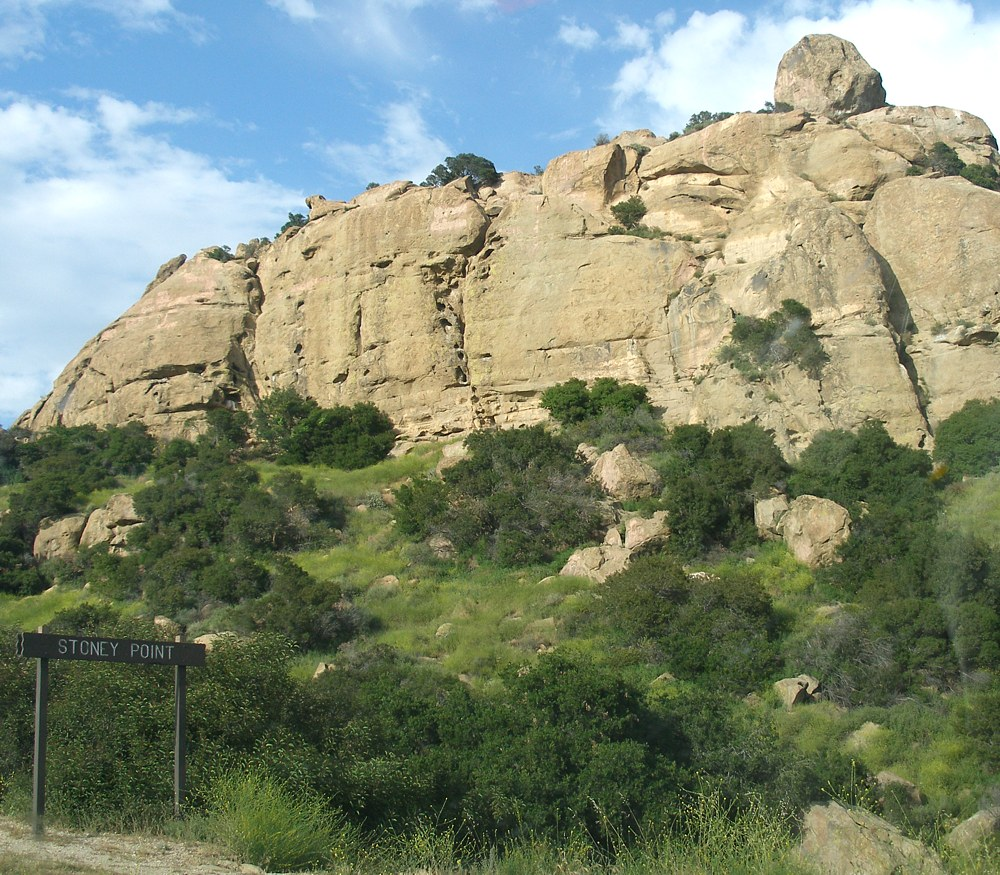
- Chatsworth Formation at Stoney Point California
- Type: Formation

Location
- Region: Los Angeles County and Ventura County, California
- Country: United States
- Extent: Simi Hills, Santa Susana Mountains

The Chatsworth Formation is a Cretaceous period sandstone geologic formation in the Simi Hills and western Santa Susana Mountains of southern California.

It is found in western Los Angeles County and eastern Ventura County. The formation's thickness can be more than 610 metres (2,000 ft).

== Fossils ==
The sedimentary marine formation preserves fossils dating from the Middle Campanian to Early Maestrichtian epochs of the Cretaceous period. It has diverse molluscan faunas.

The most common taxa are:

- ringiculid Biplica
- naticids Gyrodes and Euspira
- trochid Atira
- aporrhaids Anchuras and Lispodesthes
- turritellid Turritella
- perissityid Perissitys

== See also ==
- Stoney Point (California) — Chatsworth Formation landmark.
- Cretaceous California
- Geology of Los Angeles County, California
- List of fossiliferous stratigraphic units in California
- Paleontology in California
