= Pholidotomoidea =

Scientific classification
- Kingdom: Animalia
- Phylum: Mollusca
- Class: Gastropoda
- Subclass: Caenogastropoda
- Order: Neogastropoda
- Superfamily: †Pholidotomoidea; Cossman, 1896

Superfamily of molluscs

Pholidotomoidea is an extinct superfamily of predatory sea snails from the Late Cretaceous. It was originally described by French paleontologist Maurice Cossmann in 1896. Information about it is extremely scarce.

== Families ==
The superfamily Pholidotomoidea contains 4 families:

=== Sarganidae Stephenson, 1923 † ===
The type genus, Sargana, is described as having a "low, almost flat spire, the broad, deep spiral suleus which emerges from beneath the inner lip about midway of the aperture and extends around to the lower end of the outer lip, and a pronounced fold or ridge at the angle separating the columella from the canal."

=== Weeksiidae Sohl, 1961 † ===
Officially described as "Peripherally biangulated discoidal gastropods with simple protoconchs; ornament usually poorly developed, except at the whorl angulations; growth lines prosocline on upper whorl surface and form broad sinus in interangulation area."

=== Synonyms ===
- Pyrifusoidea Bandel & Dockery, 2001 †: Synonym of Pholidotomoidea Cossmann, 1896 †
- Sarganoidea Stephenson, 1923 †: Synonym of Pholidotomoidea Cossmann, 1896 †
- Pyrifusidae Bandel & Stinnesbeck, 2000 †: Synonym of Pyrifusinae Bandel & Stinnesbeck, 2000 †
- Pyropsidae Stephenson, 1941 †: Synonym of Pyropsinae Stephenson, 1941 †
- Volutodermatidae Pilsbry & Olsson, 1954 †: Synonym of Volutodermatinae Pilsbry & Olsson, 1954 †
