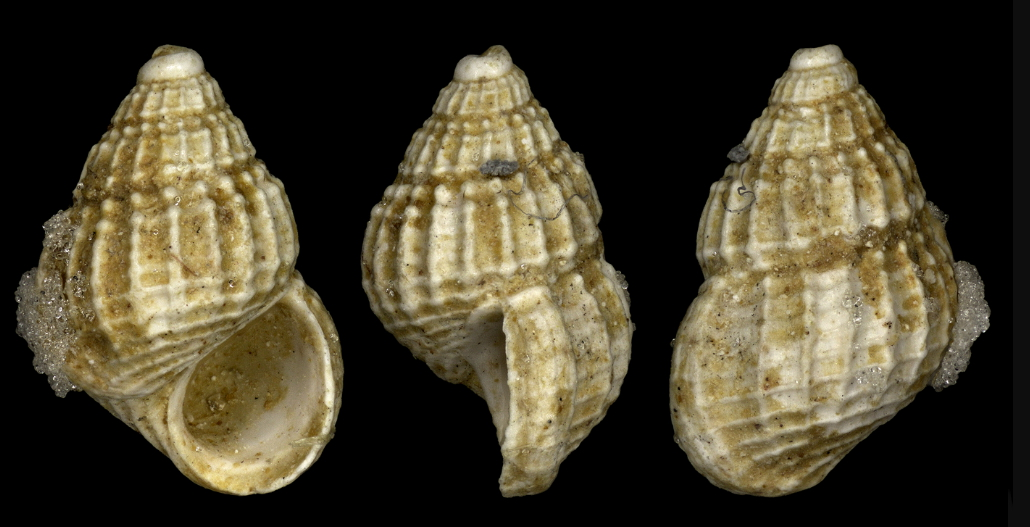
- Shell of Alvania sacyi (holotype at MNHN, Paris)

Scientific classification
- Kingdom: Animalia
- Phylum: Mollusca
- Class: Gastropoda
- Subclass: Caenogastropoda
- Order: Littorinimorpha
- Superfamily: Rissooidea
- Family: Rissoidae
- Genus: Alvania
- Species: †A. sacyi

Binomial name
- †Alvania sacyi Cossmann, 1921

= Alvania sacyi =

Species of gastropod

Alvania sacyi is an extinct species of minute sea snail, a marine gastropod mollusc or micromollusk in the family Rissoidae.

== Description ==
The length of the shell attains 3 mm, its diameter 2.5 mm.

== Distribution ==
Fossils of this species were found in Oligocene strata in Aquitaine, France.
