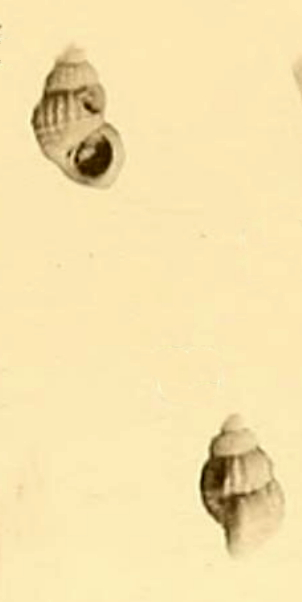
- Shell of Alvania raulini (holotype)

Scientific classification
- Kingdom: Animalia
- Phylum: Mollusca
- Class: Gastropoda
- Subclass: Caenogastropoda
- Order: Littorinimorpha
- Superfamily: Rissooidea
- Family: Rissoidae
- Genus: Alvania
- Species: †A. raulini

Binomial name
- †Alvania raulini Cossmann & Peyrot, 1919

= Alvania raulini =

Species of gastropod

Alvania raulini is an extinct species of minute sea snail, a marine gastropod mollusk or micromollusk in the family Rissoidae.

== Description ==
The shell has a notable turbinate shape and a bumpy exterior. The aperture is quite large and strudy. The length of the shell attains 1.5 mm, its diameter 1 mm.

== Distribution ==
Fossils have been found in Neogene strata in Aquitaine, France.
