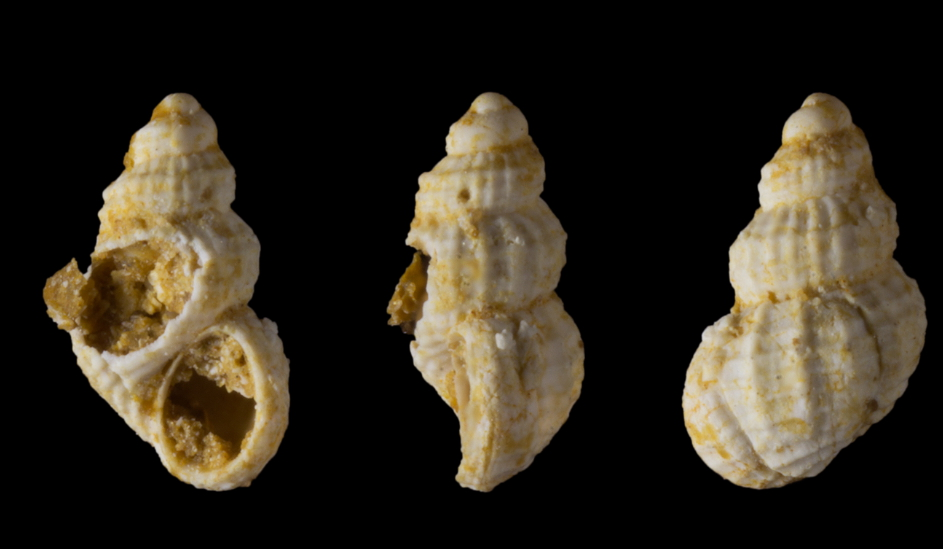
- Shell of † Alvania dollfusi (holotype at MNHN, Paris)

Scientific classification
- Kingdom: Animalia
- Phylum: Mollusca
- Class: Gastropoda
- Subclass: Caenogastropoda
- Order: Littorinimorpha
- Superfamily: Rissooidea
- Family: Rissoidae
- Genus: Alvania
- Species: †A. dollfusi

Binomial name
- †Alvania dollfusi (Cossmann & Pissarro, 1902)

Synonyms
- † Rissoia dollfusi Cossmann & Pissarro, 1902 (Rissoia incorrect subsequent spelling of Rissoa; Alvania accepted as genus)

= Alvania dollfusi =

Species of gastropod

Alvania dollfusi is an extinct species of minute sea snail, a marine gastropod mollusc or micromollusk in the family Rissoidae.

== Description ==
The length of the shell attains 2 mm, its diameter is 1 mm.

== Distribution ==
Fossils of this species were found in Eocene strata in Lower Normandy, France.
