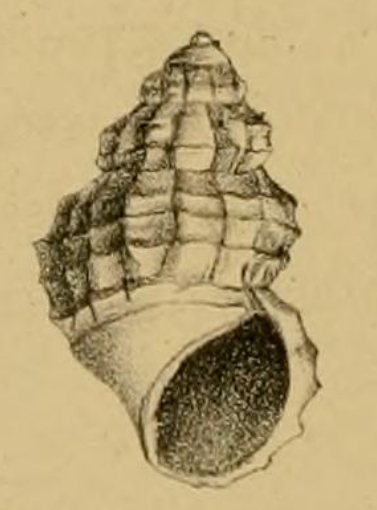
- Shell of Alvania eurydictium (holotype)

Scientific classification
- Kingdom: Animalia
- Phylum: Mollusca
- Class: Gastropoda
- Subclass: Caenogastropoda
- Order: Littorinimorpha
- Superfamily: Rissooidea
- Family: Rissoidae
- Genus: Alvania
- Species: †A. eurydictium

Binomial name
- †Alvania eurydictium (Cossmann, 1888)

Synonyms
- † Alvinia eurydictium (Cossmann, 1888) superseded combination; † Rissoia eurydictium Cossmann, 1888 (original combination)

= Alvania eurydictium =

Extinct species of gastropod

Alvania eurydictium is an extinct species of minute sea snail, a marine gastropod mollusc or micromollusk in the family Rissoidae.

== Description ==
The length of the shell attains 2.2 mm (0.087 in), its diameter 1.2 mm (0.047 in).

== Distribution ==
Fossils of this marine species were found in Eocene strata in the Paris Basin, France.
