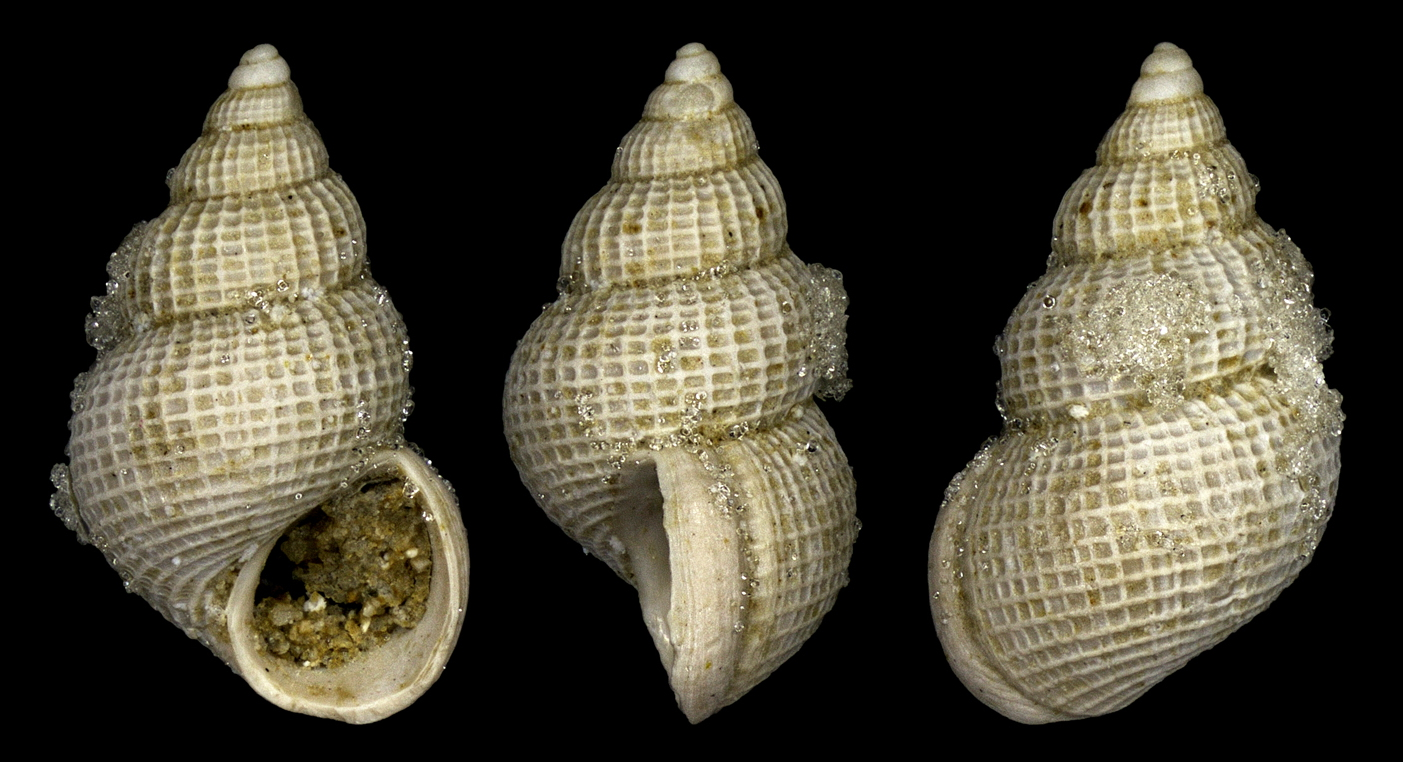
- Shell of Alvania frigida (specimen at MNHN, Paris)

Scientific classification
- Kingdom: Animalia
- Phylum: Mollusca
- Class: Gastropoda
- Subclass: Caenogastropoda
- Order: Littorinimorpha
- Superfamily: Rissooidea
- Family: Rissoidae
- Genus: Alvania
- Species: †A. frigida

Binomial name
- †Alvania frigida (Cossmann, 1921)

Synonyms
- † Alvania (Arsenia) frigida (Cossmann, 1921); † Arsenia frigida Cossmann, 1921 superseded combination; † Arsenia punctura var. frigida Cossmann, 1921 superseded rank

= Alvania frigida =

Extinct species of gastropods

Alvania frigida is an extinct species of minute sea snail, a marine gastropod mollusk or micromollusk in the family Rissoidae.

== Distribution ==
Fossils were found in Pleistocene strata in Sicily, Italy.
