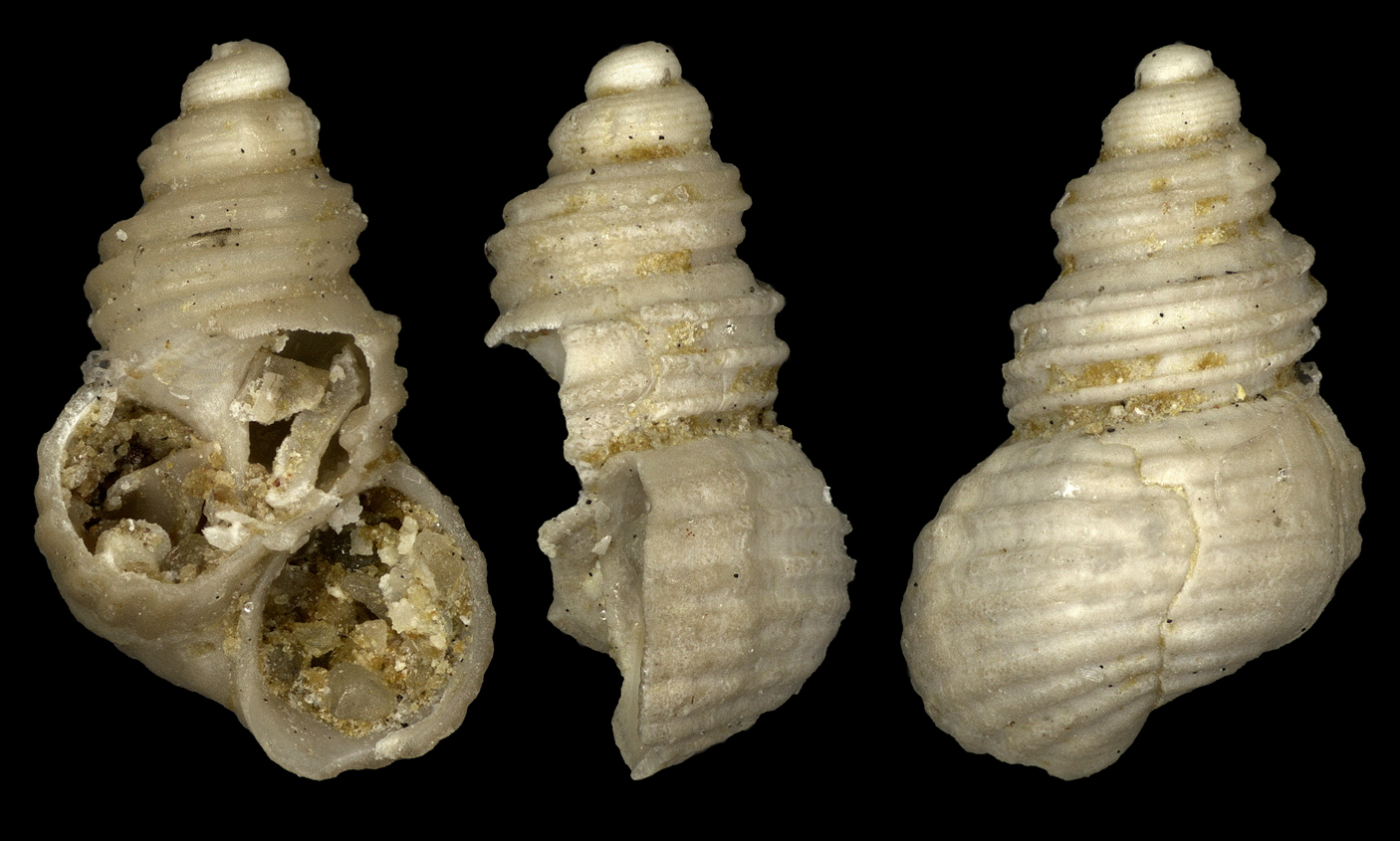
- Shell of Alvania littorinoides (holotype at MNHN, Paris)

Scientific classification
- Kingdom: Animalia
- Phylum: Mollusca
- Class: Gastropoda
- Subclass: Caenogastropoda
- Order: Littorinimorpha
- Superfamily: Rissooidea
- Family: Rissoidae
- Genus: Alvania
- Species: †A. littorinoides

Binomial name
- †Alvania littorinoides Cossmann, 1921

= Alvania littorinoides =

Species of gastropod

Alvania littorinoides is an extinct species of minute sea snail, a marine gastropod mollusc or micromollusk in the family Rissoidae.

== Description ==
The length of the shell attains 2.25 mm, its diameter 1.5 mm.

(Original description in French) The shell is minute and fragile. The spire is moderately elongated and exhibits a conical form, culminating in a smooth, obtuse protoconch. Five scalariform, convex whorls ascend rapidly, attaining approximately two-thirds of the maximum shell width. These whorls are characterized by a sloping ramp above the linear suture, and each bears three spiral keels that are decussated by growth lines. Additionally, the lower ramp is finely striated. The body whorl constitutes approximately half the total shell height, displaying a slightly convex profile and ornamentation similar to the spire. The base is rounded, sloping gently or remaining nearly flat, and exhibits a central excavation without forming a true umbilicus. The columella is barely detached, and the entire shell surface is adorned with six to seven fairly regularly spaced ribs, less prominent than the keels observed on the body whorl. The aperture is circular, possessing a thin, slightly inclined outer lip with a weakly defined external border. The columella is excavated, exhibiting a narrow, non-callous external border that does not reflect onto the basal depression.

== Distribution ==
Fossils of this species were found in Pliocene strata in Lower Normandy, France.
