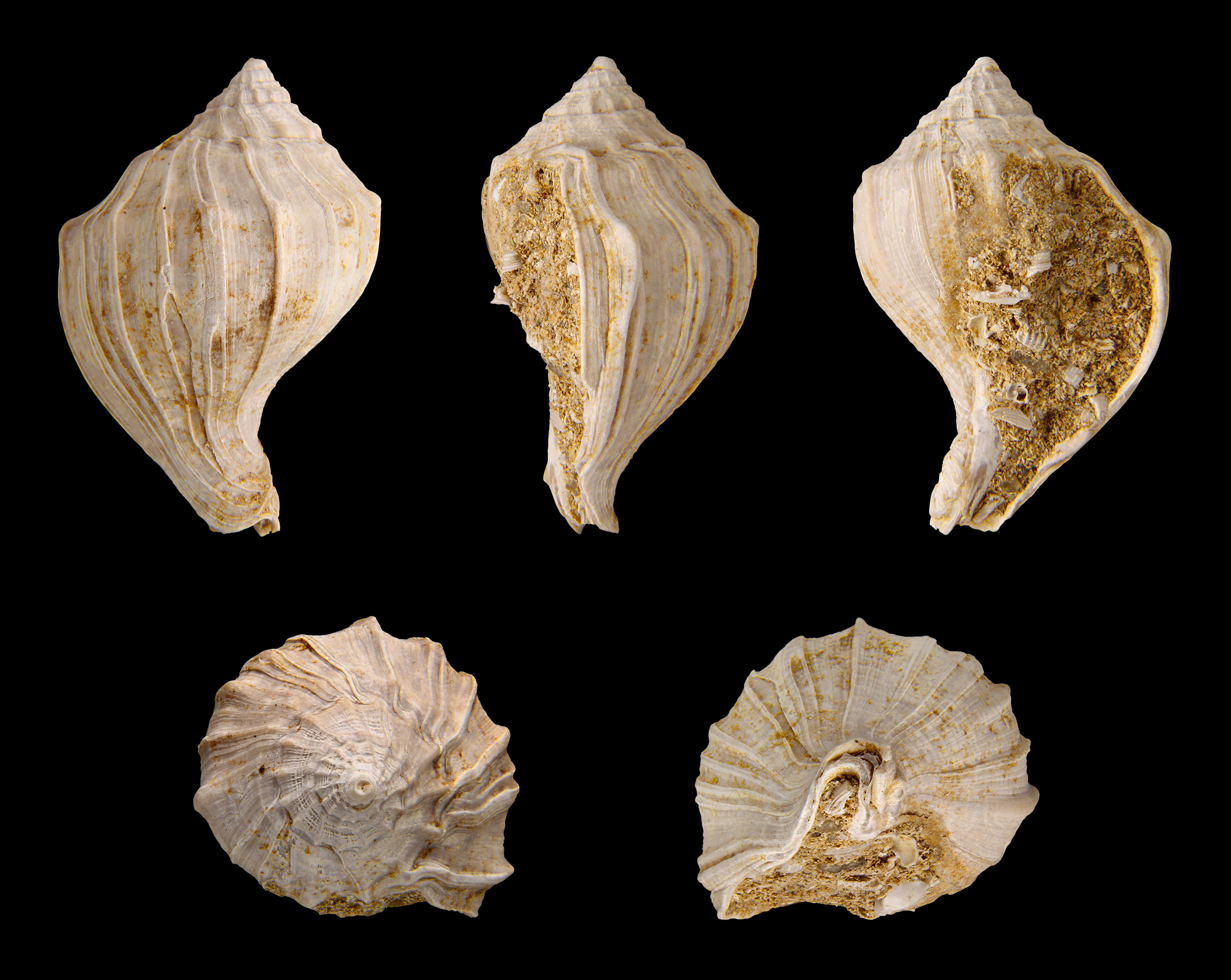
- Five views of a fossil shell of Strepsidura turgida

Scientific classification
- Kingdom: Animalia
- Phylum: Mollusca
- Class: Gastropoda
- Subclass: Caenogastropoda
- Order: Neogastropoda
- Superfamily: incertae sedis
- Family: Strepsiduridae; Cossmann, 1901

Synonyms
- Melapiidae Kantor, 1991

= Strepsiduridae =

Family of sea snails

Strepsiduridae is a taxonomic family of predatory sea snails, marine gastropod molluscs possibly in the superfamily Muricoidea, but its position is doubtful.

According to the taxonomy of the Gastropoda by Bouchet & Rocroi (2005) the family Strepsiduridae has no subfamilies.

== Genera ==
Genera within the family Strepsiduridae include:

- Strepsidura Swainson, 1840
  - The type species of the genus Strepsidura is fossil.
  - † Strepsidura ficus (Gabb)
  - † Strepsidura harrisi Givens & Garvie, 1994
  - †Strepsidura turgida (Solander, 1766)
- Melapium H. Adams & A. Adams, 1853
  - Melapium elatum (Schubert & Wagner, 1829)
  - Melapium lineatum (Lamarck, 1822)
