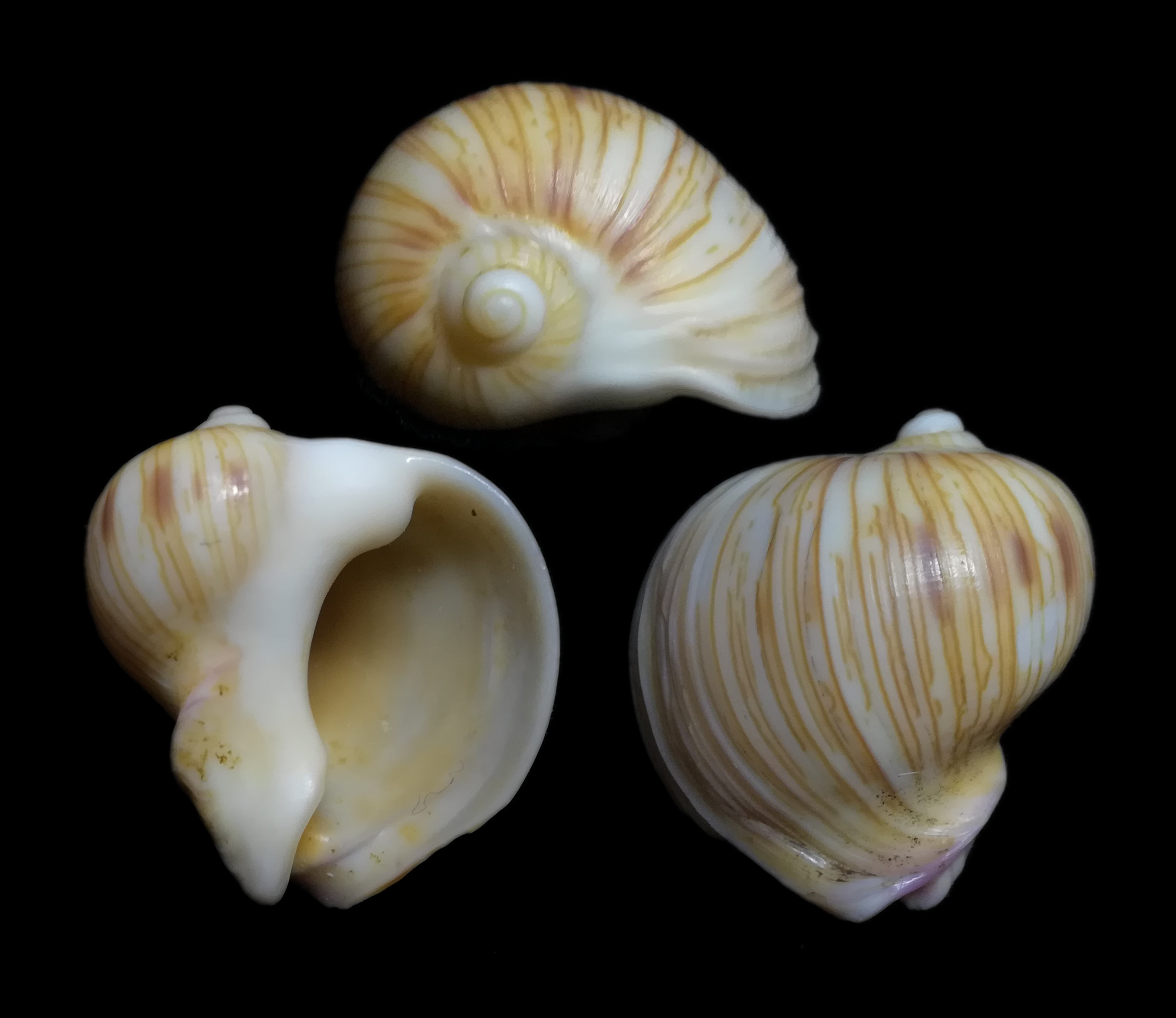

Scientific classification
- Kingdom: Animalia
- Phylum: Mollusca
- Class: Gastropoda
- Subclass: Caenogastropoda
- Order: Neogastropoda
- Family: Strepsiduridae
- Genus: Melapium
- Species: M. lineatum

Binomial name
- Melapium lineatum (Lamarck, 1822)

= Melapium lineatum =

Species of gastropod

Melapium lineatum is a species of sea snail, a marine gastropod mollusc in the family Strepsiduridae.

== Distribution ==
South Africa.
