= Melanella dubusi =

- Shell of Melanella dubusi (holotype)

Scientific classification
- Kingdom: Animalia
- Phylum: Mollusca
- Class: Gastropoda
- Subclass: Caenogastropoda
- Order: Littorinimorpha
- Family: Eulimidae
- Genus: Melanella
- Species: †M. dubusi

Binomial name
- †Melanella dubusi (Cossmann & Pissaro, 1902)

Synonyms
- Eulima dubusi Cossmann & Pissarro, 1902

Extinct species of gastropod

Melanella dubusi is an extinct species of sea snail, a marine gastropod mollusk in the family Eulimidae.

== Description ==
The length of the shell attains 5 mm, its diameter 2 mm.

(Original description in French) The size is small, and the form is stocky. The spire is long, twisted on itself, with a conical profile, and ends in a smooth, elongated protoconch of two whorls. There are seven narrow, barely convex whorls separated by well-marked sutures. The body whorl is large, slightly greater than two-fifths of the total height, and subangular at the base, which is convex. The aperture is oval and situated in a vertical plane; the outer lip is barely sinuous, the columella is excavated, and the columellar lip is callous and slightly detached from the base.

== Distribution ==
Fossils of this species have been found near Hauteville, France.
