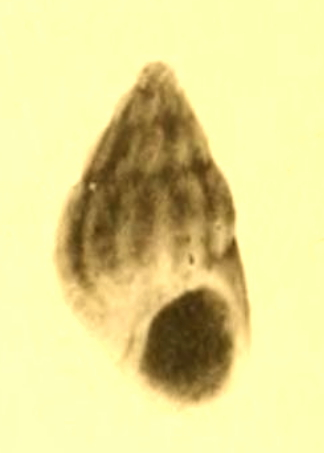
- Shell of Alvania dumasi (holotype)

Scientific classification
- Kingdom: Animalia
- Phylum: Mollusca
- Class: Gastropoda
- Subclass: Caenogastropoda
- Order: Littorinimorpha
- Superfamily: Rissooidea
- Family: Rissoidae
- Genus: Alvania
- Species: †A. dumasi

Binomial name
- †Alvania dumasi (Cossmann, 1899)

Synonyms
- † Rissoia dumasi Cossmann, 1899

= Alvania dumasi =

Species of gastropod

Alvania dumasi is an extinct species of minute sea snail, a marine gastropod mollusk or micromollusk in the family Rissoidae.

== Description ==
The length of the shell attains 3.25 mm, its diameter 2 mm.

== Distribution ==
Fossils were found in Eocene strata in the Lower Loire basin, France.
