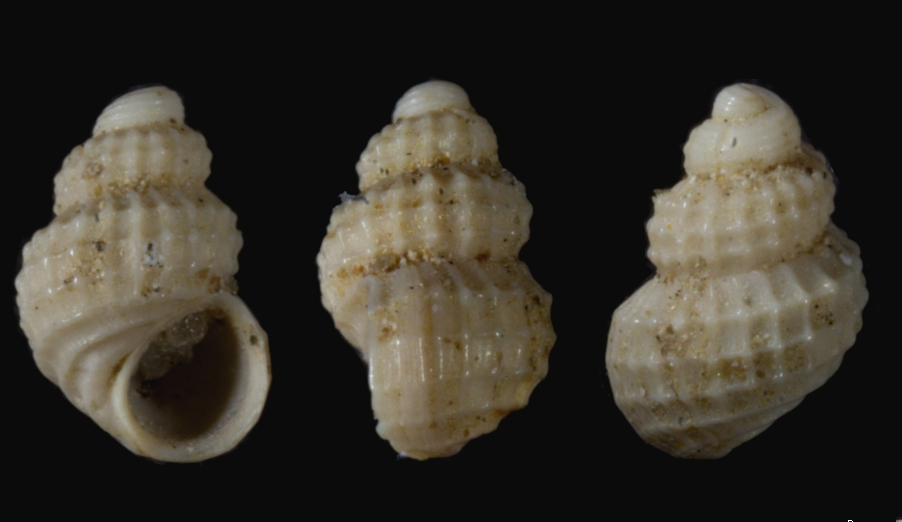
- Shell of † Alvania allixi (holotype at MNHN, Paris)

Scientific classification
- Kingdom: Animalia
- Phylum: Mollusca
- Class: Gastropoda
- Subclass: Caenogastropoda
- Order: Littorinimorpha
- Superfamily: Rissooidea
- Family: Rissoidae
- Genus: Alvania
- Species: †A. allixi

Binomial name
- †Alvania allixi Cossmann, 1919

Synonyms
- † Alvinia allixi (Cossmann, 1919)superseded combination

= Alvania allixi =

Species of gastropod

Alvania allixi is an extinct species of minute sea snail, a marine gastropod mollusc or micromollusk in the family Rissoidae.

== Description ==
The length of the shell attains 1.75 mm, its diameter is 1.25 mm.

== Distribution ==
Fossils of this species were found in Eocene strata in the Loire-Atlantique, France.
