= Pholidotomidae =

Scientific classification
- Kingdom: Animalia
- Phylum: Mollusca
- Class: Gastropoda
- Subclass: Caenogastropoda
- Order: Neogastropoda
- Superfamily: †Pholidotomoidea
- Family: †Pholidotomidae; Cossmann, 1896

Family of sea snails (fossil)

Pholidotomidae is an extinct taxonomic family of fossil predatory sea snails, marine gastropod molluscs in the superfamily Pholidotomoidea.
