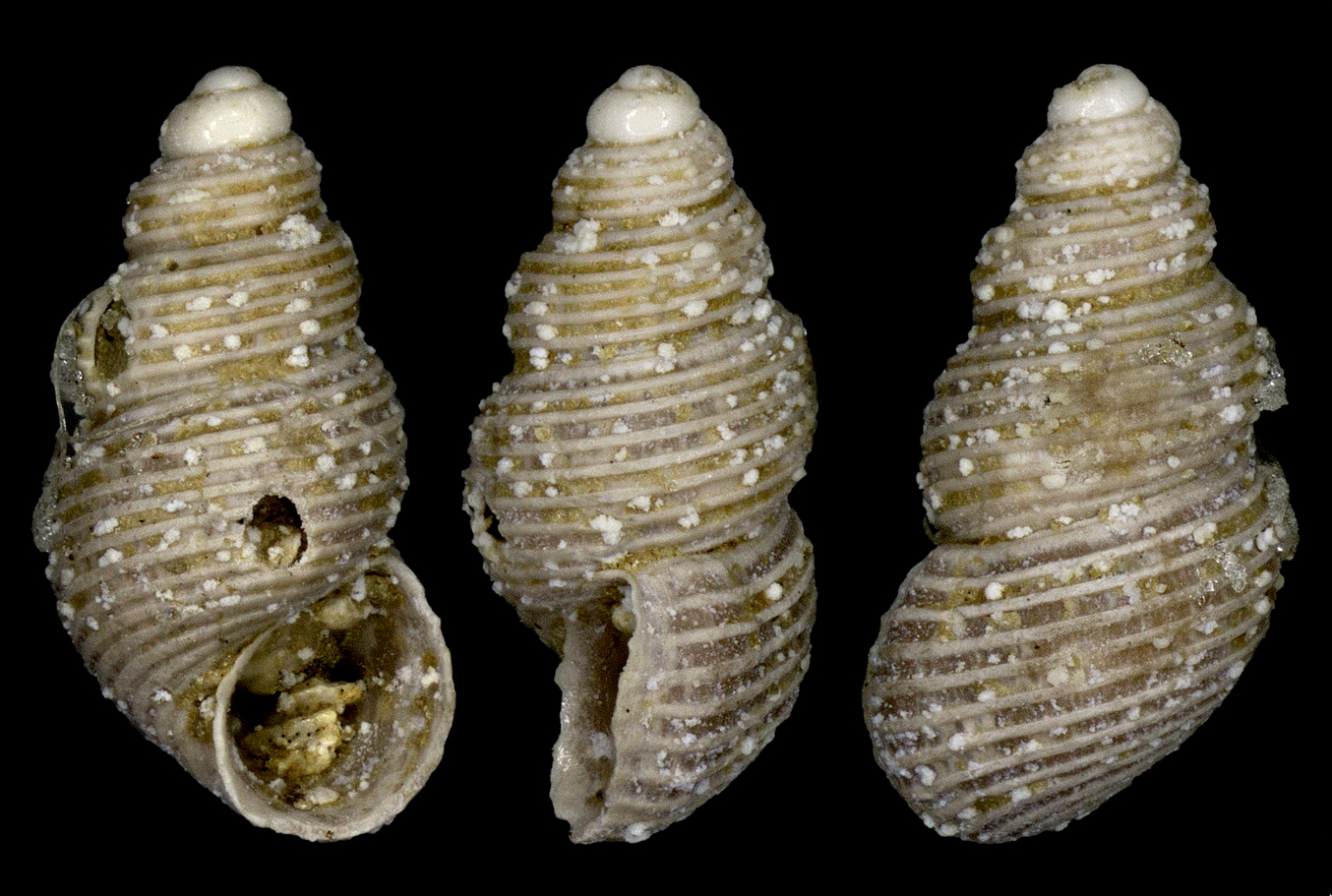
- Shell of † Alvania gourbesvillensis (holotype at MNHN, Paris)

Scientific classification
- Kingdom: Animalia
- Phylum: Mollusca
- Class: Gastropoda
- Subclass: Caenogastropoda
- Order: Littorinimorpha
- Superfamily: Rissooidea
- Family: Rissoidae
- Genus: Alvania
- Species: †A. gourbesvillensis

Binomial name
- †Alvania gourbesvillensis (Cossmann, 1921)

Synonyms
- † Arsenia gourbesvillensis Cossmann, 1921 (Arsenia regarded as a junior synonym of Alvania)

= Alvania gourbesvillensis =

Species of gastropod

Alvania gourbesvillensis is an extinct species of minute sea snail, a marine gastropod mollusc or micromollusk in the family Rissoidae.

== Distribution ==
Fossils of this species were found in Pliocene strata in Lower Normandy, France.
