= Johnwyattiidae =

Scientific classification
- Kingdom: Animalia
- Phylum: Mollusca
- Class: Gastropoda
- Subclass: Caenogastropoda
- Order: Neogastropoda
- Family: †Johnwyattiidae; Serna, 1979

Extinct family of gastropods

Johnwyattiidae is an extinct taxonomic family of fossil sea snails, marine gastropod mollusks.
