= Sarganidae =

Scientific classification
- Kingdom: Animalia
- Phylum: Mollusca
- Class: Gastropoda
- Subclass: Caenogastropoda
- Order: Neogastropoda
- Superfamily: †Pholidotomoidea
- Family: †Sarganidae; Stephenson, 1923

Extinct family of gastropods

Sarganidae is an extinct family of Cretaceous-aged predatory sea snails, marine gastropod molluscs in the clade Neogastropoda.

== Subfamilies ==
The family Sarganidae contains 6 genera in 4 subfamilies:

=== Hippocampoidinae Bandel & Dockery, 2012 † ===
Hippocampoides Wade, 1916 †

=== Pseudecphorinae Bandel & Dockery, 2001 † ===
Pseudecphora Bandel & Dockery, 2001 †

=== Sarganinae Stephenson, 1923 † ===
Praesargana Saul & Popenoe, 1993 †

Sargana Stephenson, 1923 †

=== Schizobasinae Bandel & Dockery, 2001 † ===
Schizobasis Wade, 1916 †
