= Weeksiidae =

Scientific classification
- Kingdom: Animalia
- Phylum: Mollusca
- Class: Gastropoda
- Subclass: Caenogastropoda
- Order: Neogastropoda
- Superfamily: †Pholidotomoidea
- Family: †Weeksiidae; Sohl, 1961

Extinct family of gastropods

Weeksiidae is an extinct family of fossil sea snails, marine gastropod molluscs.
