= Taiomidae =

Scientific classification
- Kingdom: Animalia
- Phylum: Mollusca
- Class: Gastropoda
- Subclass: Caenogastropoda
- Order: Neogastropoda
- Superfamily: incertae sedis
- Family: †Taiomidae; Finlay & Marwick, 1937

Extinct family of gastropods

Taiomidae is an extinct taxonomic family of fossil predatory sea snails, marine gastropod molluscs in the clade Neogastropoda.
