= Perissityidae =

Scientific classification
- Kingdom: Animalia
- Phylum: Mollusca
- Class: Gastropoda
- Subclass: Caenogastropoda
- Order: Neogastropoda
- Superfamily: incertae sedis
- Family: †Perissityidae; Popenoe & Saul, 1987

Extinct family of gastropods

Perissityidae is an extinct family of fossil sea snails, i.e., marine gastropod mollusks.
