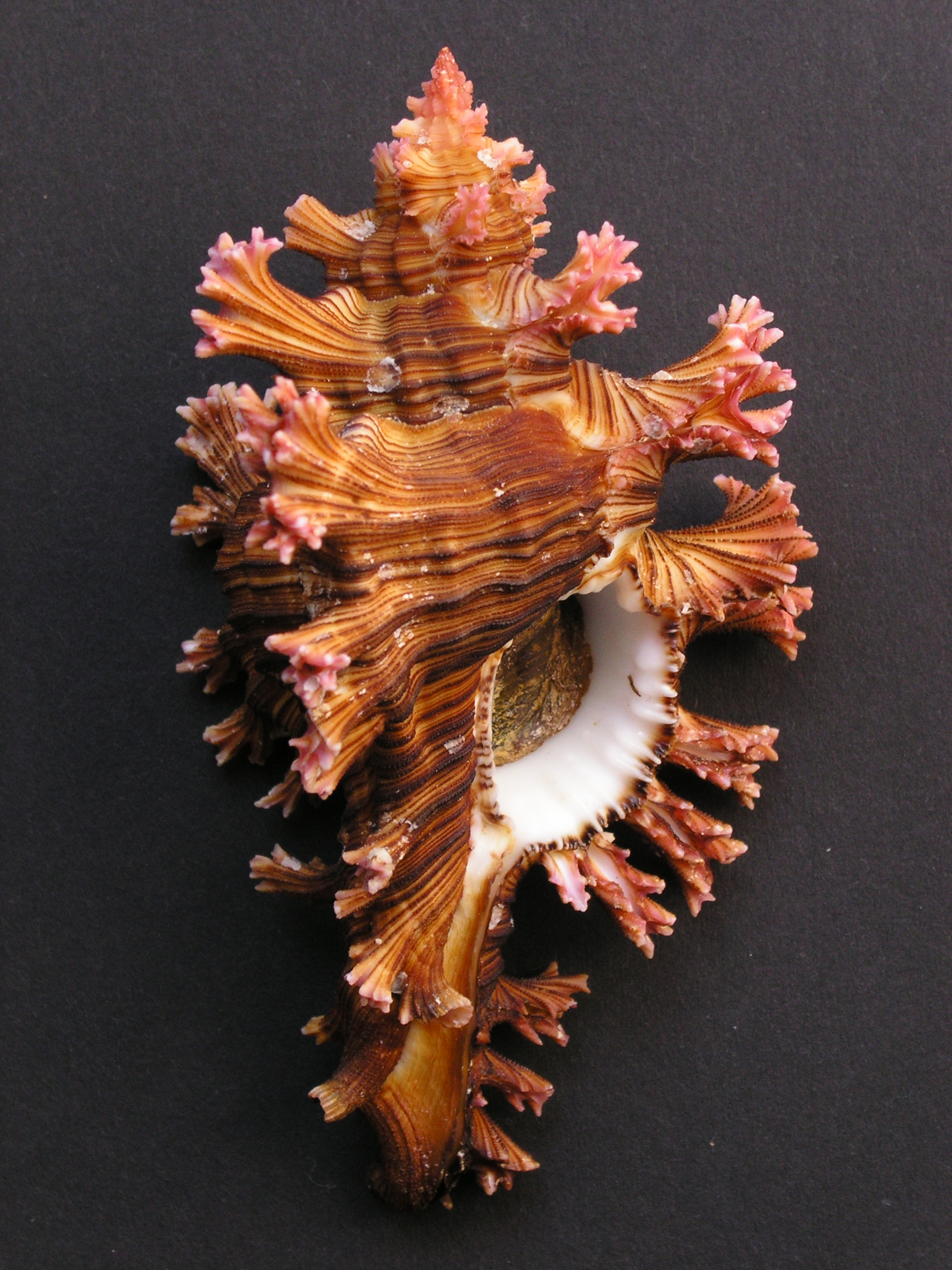
- The shell of a neogastropod, the muricid species Chicoreus palmarosae

Scientific classification
- Kingdom: Animalia
- Phylum: Mollusca
- Class: Gastropoda
- Subclass: Caenogastropoda
- Order: Neogastropoda; Wenz, 1938

Superfamilies
- See text

= Neogastropoda =

Neogastropoda Temporal range: Early Cretaceous-Recent

Clade of sea snails

Neogastropoda is an order of aquatic snails, both freshwater and marine gastropod molluscs. Neogastropods and their close relatives, such as Tonnoidea and Cypraeoidea, form the clade Latrogastropoda.

== Description ==
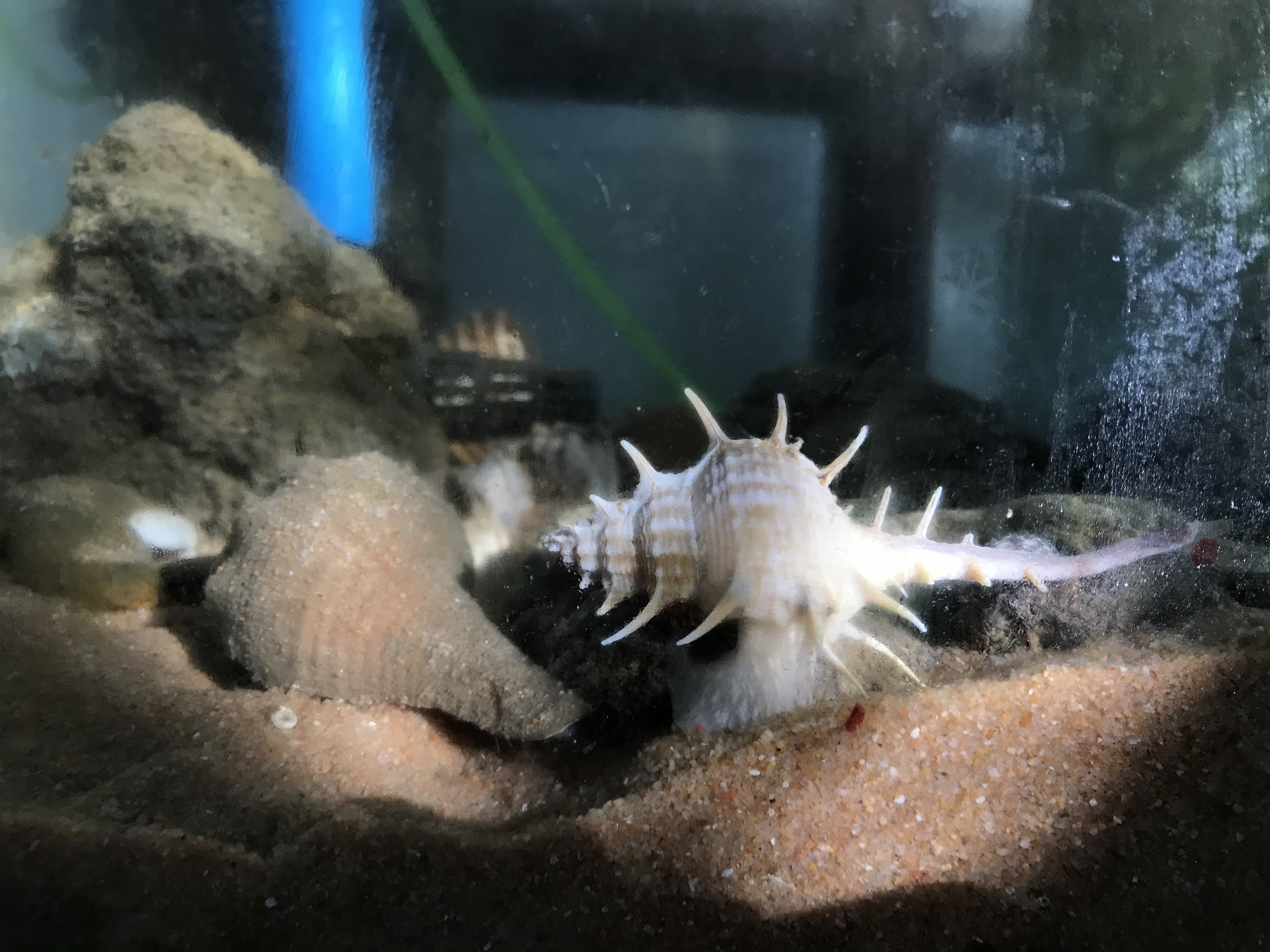
Two neogastropods, Brunneifusus ternatanus (left) and Murex trapa (right) in captivity.

The available fossil record of Neogastropoda is relatively complete, and supports a widely accepted evolutionary scenario of an Early Cretaceous origin of the group followed by two rapid diversification rounds in the late Cretaceous and the Paleocene.

These sea snails have only one auricle, one kidney and one monopectinate gill, i.e. the gill filaments develop on only one side of the central axis.

The shell has a well-developed siphonal canal. The elongated trunk-like siphon is an extensible tube, formed from a fold in the mantle. It is used to suck water into the mantle cavity. At the base of the siphon is the bipectinate (branching from a central axis) osphradium, a sensory receptacle and olfactory organ, that is more developed than the one in the Mesogastropoda. They achieved important morphological changes including e.g., the elongation of the siphonal canal, a shift in the mouth opening to a terminal position on the head, and the formation of a well-developed proboscis.

The nervous system is very concentrated. Many species have the ganglia in a compact space.

The rachiglossate (rasp-like) radula, a layer of serially arranged teeth within the mouth, has only three denticles (small teeth) in each transverse row.

The Neogastropoda have separate sexes.

There are about 16,000 species. Neogastropoda includes many well-known gastropods including the cone snails, conchs, mud snails, olive snails, oyster drills, tulip shells, and whelks. The Neogastropoda all live in the sea, except Clea, and Rivomarginella that are freshwater genera. The neogastropods are most diverse in tropical seas. They are mostly predators, but some are saprophagous (scavengers).

== Taxonomy ==
According to the taxonomy of the Gastropoda by Bouchet & Rocroi (2005) the clade Neogastropoda consists of these superfamilies:

- Buccinoidea Rafinesque, 1815
- Conoidea Fleming, 1822
- Cancellarioidea Forbes & Hanley, 1851: since 2017 treated as the superfamily Volutoidea Rafinesque, 1815
- Mitroidea Swainson, 1831 : added in 2017
- Muricoidea Rafinesque, 1815
- Olivoidea Latreille, 1825
- † Pholidotomoidea Cossmann, 1896
- Pseudolivoidea (de Gregorio, 1880): since 2017 treated as a synonym of the superfamily Olivoidea Latreille, 1825
- Turbinelloidea Rafinesque, 1815
- Volutoidea Rafinesque, 1815

When Neogastropoda was an order, it was placed within the prosobranch gastropods according to the taxonomy developed by Thiele (1921). The families which used to form the order Neogastropoda are now included in the clade Neogastropoda Cox, 1960.

Ever since Thiele (1929), Neogastropoda have been considered a natural group, clearly differentiated from other Caenogastropoda. The monophyly of the group is widely accepted among morphologists, and it is based on several synapomorphies mostly related with the anatomy of the digestive system. Current classifications of Neogastropoda generally recognize up to six superfamilies: Buccinoidea, Muricoidea, Olivoidea, Pseudolivoidea, Conoidea, and Cancellarioidea. Phylogenetic relationships among neogastropod superfamilies based on morphological characters are rather unstable, and for instance, Cancellarioidea or Buccinoidea have been alternatively proposed as the sister group of the remaining Neogastropoda.

== Families ==
According to the taxonomy of the Gastropoda by Bouchet & Rocroi (2005) the taxonomy of clade Neogastropoda is as follows:

- Unassigned to a superfamily- assigned to Neogastropoda incertae sedis (temporary name)
  - Family Babyloniidae Kuroda, Habe & Oyama, 1971
  - Genus Enigmavasum Poppe & Tagaro, 2005
  - Family Harpidae Bronn, 1849
  - † Family Johnwyattiidae Serna, 1979
  - † Family Perissityidae Popenoe & Saul, 1987
  - † Family Sarganidae Stephenson, 1923: belong to the superfamily † Pholidotomoidea
  - † Family Speightiidae A. W. B. Powell, 1942
  - Family Strepsiduridae Cossmann, 1901
  - † Family Taiomidae H. J. Finlay & Marwick, 1937
  - † Family Weeksiidae Sohl, 1961: belongs to the superfamily † Pholidotomoidea
- Superfamily Buccinoidea
  - Family Belomitridae Kantor, Puillandre, Rivasseau & Bouchet, 2012
  - Family Buccinidae
  - Family Busyconidae Wade, 1917 (1867)
  - Family Colubrariidae
  - Family Columbellidae
  - † Family Echinofulguridae Petuch, 1994
  - Family Fasciolariidae
  - Family Melongenidae
  - Family Nassariidae
- Superfamily Mitroidea Swainson, 1831
  - Family Charitodoronidae Fedosov, Herrmann, Kantor & Bouchet, 2018
  - Family Mitridae
  - Family Pyramimitridae Cossmann, 1901
- Superfamily Muricoidea
  - Family Muricidae
  - Family Costellariidae
  - Family Cystiscidae
  - Family Marginellidae
  - † Family Pholidotomidae
  - Family Pleioptygmatidae
  - Family Turbinellidae
  - Family Volutidae
  - Family Volutomitridae
- Superfamily Olivoidea
  - Family Olividae
  - Family Olivellidae
- Superfamily Pseudolivoidea: since 2017 treated as a synonym of the superfamily Olivoidea Latreille, 1825
  - Family Pseudolividae
  - Family Ptychatractidae
- Superfamily Conoidea
  - Family Conidae
  - Family Clavatulidae
  - Family Drilliidae
  - Family Pseudomelatomidae
  - Family Strictispiridae
  - Family Terebridae
  - Family Turridae
- Superfamily Cancellarioidea: since 2017 treated as the superfamily Volutoidea Rafinesque, 1815
  - Family Cancellariidae
