= Maurice Cossmann =

French paleontologist and malacologist

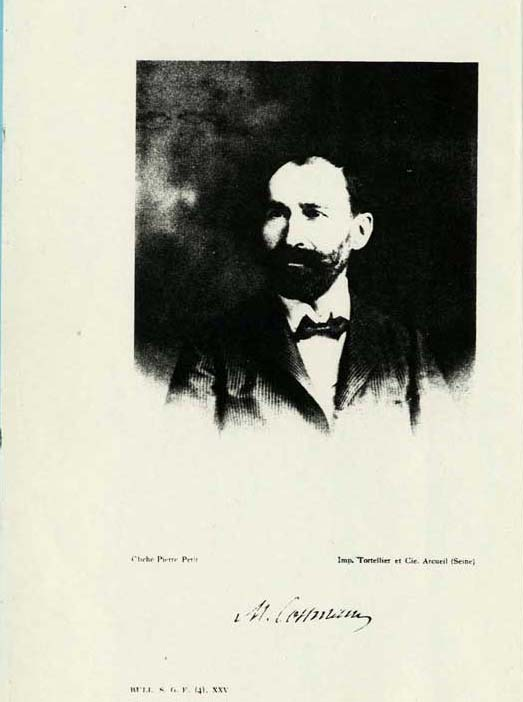
Maurice Cossmann

Maurice Cossmann, full name Alexandre Édouard Maurice Cossmann (16 October 1850 – 17 May 1924) was a French paleontologist and malacologist.

Maurice Cossmann's father was an artist draughtsman and a talented lithographer. His early education was at Condorcet College in Paris and he later gained the Diploma of the Central School of Arts and Manufacturing in the same city. He was then employed by the Compagnie des chemins de fer du Nord. Cossmann made all his career there, finally as Chief of the Engineering services (Ingénieur Chef des Services Techniques). Married and without a child, he loved to tell how the arrival of a small collection of fossils had led to his future studies of paleontology. Cossman specialised in the fossils of the Paleogene and Neogene periods. Certain of his works are still a major reference especially:

- Iconographie complète des coquilles fossiles de l'Éocène des environs de Paris, in English Iconography of the fossil shells of the Eocene of the Paris basin) written with G. Pissaro (1904–1913, c. 3000 pages and 110 plates) and
- Conchyliologie néogénique de l’Aquitaine in English Neogene Conchology of Aquitaine with A. Peyrot (in Actes de la Société Linnéenne de Bordeaux, 1909–1932, vol. 45–85, c. 4500 pages and 121 plates).

Cossman published, sometimes collaboratively, 186 works (scientific papers and monographs) between 1879 and 1926 and he was the Editor of Revue critique de paléozoologie et de paléophytologie Paris 1897–1919. His work is described in two obituaries written by G.F.Dollfus in 1925 and A.R.Kabat in 1989.
