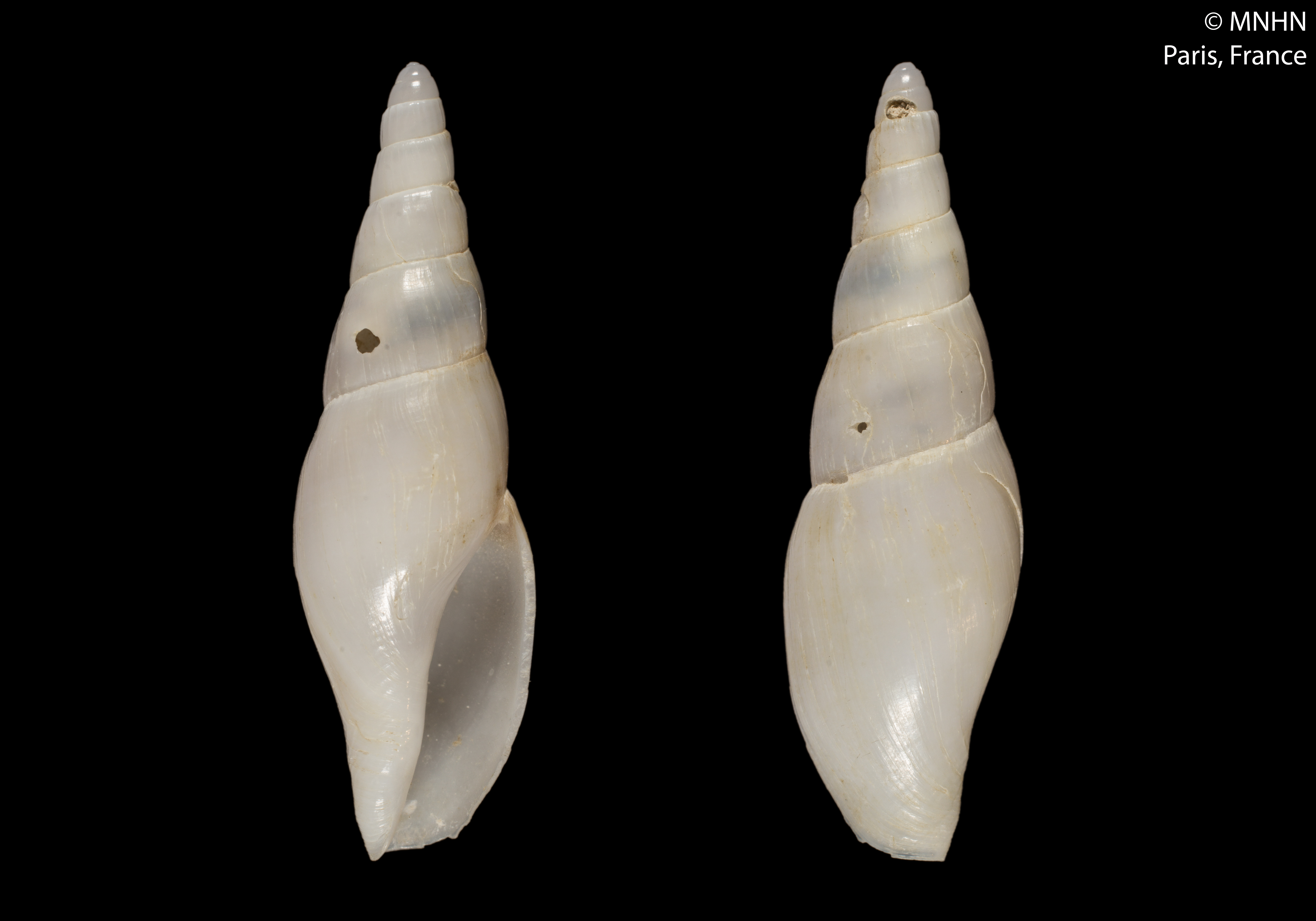
- Shell of Eumitra caledonica (holotype at MNHN, Paris)

Scientific classification
- Kingdom: Animalia
- Phylum: Mollusca
- Class: Gastropoda
- Subclass: Caenogastropoda
- Order: Neogastropoda
- Superfamily: Mitroidea
- Family: Mitridae
- Subfamily: Mitrinae
- Genus: Eumitra
- Species: E. caledonica

Binomial name
- Eumitra caledonica Lozouet, 1991

= Eumitra caledonica =

Species of gastropod

Eumitra caledonica is a species of sea snail, a marine gastropod mollusk, in the family Mitridae, the miters or miter snails.

== Distribution ==
This marine species occurs off New Caledonia.
