= Cancillopsis chuoi =

Scientific classification
- Kingdom: Animalia
- Phylum: Mollusca
- Class: Gastropoda
- Subclass: Caenogastropoda
- Order: Neogastropoda
- Superfamily: Mitroidea
- Family: Mitridae
- Subfamily: Mitrinae
- Genus: Cancillopsis
- Species: C. chuoi

Binomial name
- Cancillopsis chuoi (Huang & Salisbury, 2017)

Synonyms
- Calcimitra chuoi (S.-I Huang & R. Salisbury, 2017); Cancilla chuoi Huang & Salisbury, 2017

Species of gastropod

Cancillopsis chuoi is a species of sea snail, a marine gastropod mollusk, belonging to the family Mitridae, the miters or miter snails.
