= Quasimitra pseudobovei =

Scientific classification
- Kingdom: Animalia
- Phylum: Mollusca
- Class: Gastropoda
- Subclass: Caenogastropoda
- Order: Neogastropoda
- Superfamily: Mitroidea
- Family: Mitridae
- Subfamily: Mitrinae
- Genus: Quasimitra
- Species: Q. pseudobovei

Binomial name
- Quasimitra pseudobovei (T. Cossignani & V. Cossignani, 2005)

Synonyms
- Mitra (Mitra) pseudobovei T. Cossignani & V. Cossignani, 2005; Mitra pseudobovei T. Cossignani & V. Cossignani, 2005

Species of gastropod

Quasimitra pseudobovei is a species of sea snail, a marine gastropod mollusk, in the family Mitridae, the miters or miter snails.
