= Charitodoron barbara =

Scientific classification
- Kingdom: Animalia
- Phylum: Mollusca
- Class: Gastropoda
- Subclass: Caenogastropoda
- Order: Neogastropoda
- Superfamily: Mitroidea
- Family: Charitodoronidae
- Genus: Charitodoron
- Species: C. barbara

Binomial name
- Charitodoron barbara (Thiele, 1925)

Synonyms
- Charitodoron euphrosyne Tomlin, 1932; Columbella barbara Thiele, 1925 (original combination)

Species of gastropod

Charitodoron barbara is a species of sea snail, a marine gastropod mollusk in the family Charitodoronidae.
