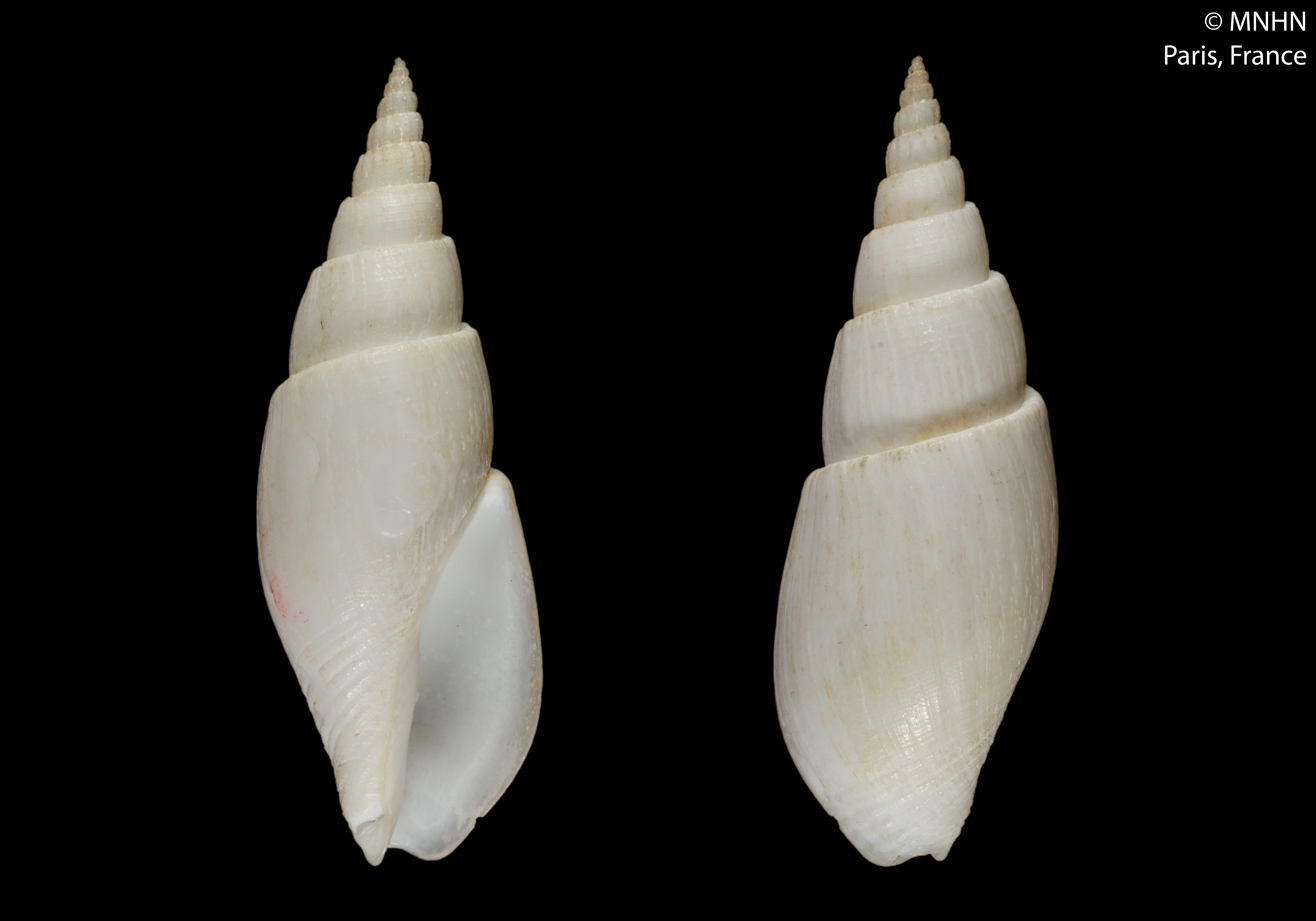
- Shell of Eumitra suduirauti (holotype at MNHN, Paris)

Scientific classification
- Kingdom: Animalia
- Phylum: Mollusca
- Class: Gastropoda
- Subclass: Caenogastropoda
- Order: Neogastropoda
- Superfamily: Mitroidea
- Family: Mitridae
- Subfamily: Mitrinae
- Genus: Eumitra
- Species: E. suduirauti

Binomial name
- Eumitra suduirauti Bozzetti, 1997

= Eumitra suduirauti =

Species of gastropod

Eumitra suduirauti is a species of sea snail, a marine gastropod mollusk, in the family Mitridae, the miters or miter snails.

== Description ==
The length of the shell attains 51.7 mm.

== Distribution ==
This marine species occurs off the Philippines.

== Distribution ==
This species occurs in Philippines.
