= Charitodoron thalia =

Scientific classification
- Kingdom: Animalia
- Phylum: Mollusca
- Class: Gastropoda
- Subclass: Caenogastropoda
- Order: Neogastropoda
- Superfamily: Mitroidea
- Family: Charitodoronidae
- Genus: Charitodoron
- Species: C. thalia

Binomial name
- Charitodoron thalia Tomlin, 1932

Synonyms
- Charitodoron pasithea Tomlin, 1943; Mitra bathybius Barnard, 1959

Species of gastropod

Charitodoron thalia is a species of sea snail, a marine gastropod mollusk in the family Charitodoronidae.
