= Eumitra alokiza =

Scientific classification
- Kingdom: Animalia
- Phylum: Mollusca
- Class: Gastropoda
- Subclass: Caenogastropoda
- Order: Neogastropoda
- Superfamily: Mitroidea
- Family: Mitridae
- Subfamily: Mitrinae
- Genus: Eumitra
- Species: †E. alokiza

Binomial name
- †Eumitra alokiza (Tenison Woods, 1879)

Synonyms
- †Mitra alokiza Tenison Woods, 1879

Extinct species of gastropod

Eumitra alokiza is an extinct species of sea snail, a marine gastropod mollusk, in the family Mitridae, the miters or miter snails.
