= Eumitra waitemataensis =

Scientific classification
- Kingdom: Animalia
- Phylum: Mollusca
- Class: Gastropoda
- Subclass: Caenogastropoda
- Order: Neogastropoda
- Superfamily: Mitroidea
- Family: Mitridae
- Subfamily: Mitrinae
- Genus: Eumitra
- Species: †E. waitemataensis

Binomial name
- †Eumitra waitemataensis (Powell & Bartrum, 1929)

Synonyms
- †Diplomitra waitemataensis Powell & Bartrum, 1929

Extinct species of gastropod

Eumitra waitemataensis is an extinct species of sea snail, a marine gastropod mollusk, in the family Mitridae, the miters or miter snails.

== Distribution ==
This species occurs in New Zealand.
