= Quasimitra brettinghami =

Scientific classification
- Kingdom: Animalia
- Phylum: Mollusca
- Class: Gastropoda
- Subclass: Caenogastropoda
- Order: Neogastropoda
- Superfamily: Mitroidea
- Family: Mitridae
- Subfamily: Mitrinae
- Genus: Quasimitra
- Species: Q. brettinghami

Binomial name
- Quasimitra brettinghami (E. A. Smith, 1906)

Synonyms
- Mitra (Mitra) nubila brettinghami E. A. Smith, 1906; Mitra brettinghami E. A. Smith, 1906; Mitra nubila brettinghami E. A. Smith, 1906

Species of gastropod

Quasimitra brettinghami is a species of sea snail, a marine gastropod mollusk, in the family Mitridae, the miters or miter snails.
