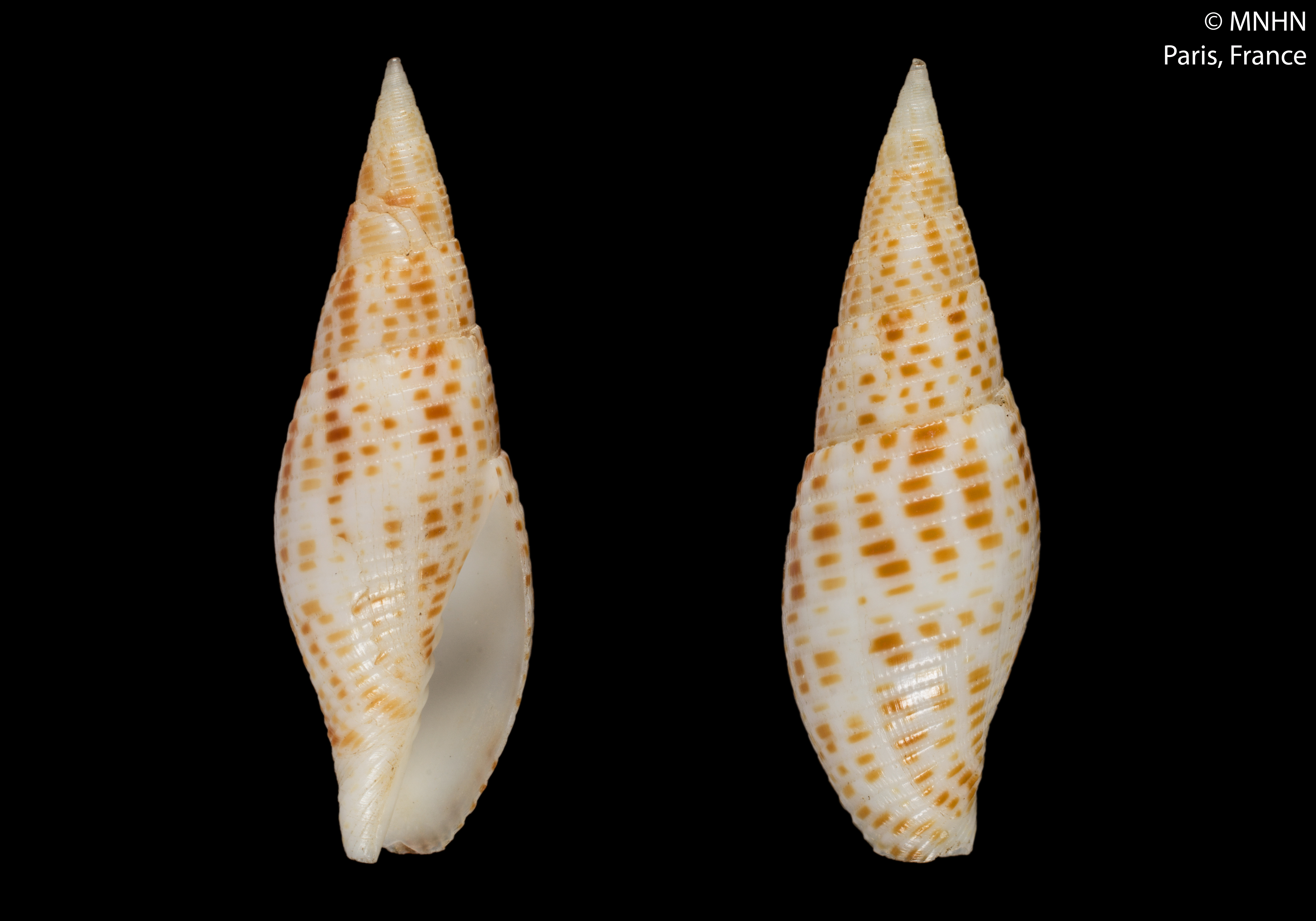
- Shell of Quasimitra raphaeli (holotype at MNHN, Paris)

Scientific classification
- Kingdom: Animalia
- Phylum: Mollusca
- Class: Gastropoda
- Subclass: Caenogastropoda
- Order: Neogastropoda
- Superfamily: Mitroidea
- Family: Mitridae
- Subfamily: Mitrinae
- Genus: Quasimitra
- Species: Q. raphaeli

Binomial name
- Quasimitra raphaeli (Drivas & Jay, 1990)

Synonyms
- Mitra raphaeli Drivas & Jay, 1990

= Quasimitra raphaeli =

Species of gastropod

Quasimitra raphaeli is a species of sea snail, a marine gastropod mollusk, in the family Mitridae, the miters or miter snails.

== Description ==
The length of the shell attains 30.6 mm.

== Distribution ==
This species occurs in the Indian Ocean off Réunion.
