= Cancillopsis meimiaoae =

Scientific classification
- Kingdom: Animalia
- Phylum: Mollusca
- Class: Gastropoda
- Subclass: Caenogastropoda
- Order: Neogastropoda
- Superfamily: Mitroidea
- Family: Mitridae
- Subfamily: Mitrinae
- Genus: Cancillopsis
- Species: C. meimiaoae

Binomial name
- Cancillopsis meimiaoae (Huang & Salisbury, 2017)

Synonyms
- Cancilla meimiaoae Huang & Salisbury, 2017

Species of gastropod

Cancillopsis meimiaoae is a species of sea snail, a marine gastropod mollusk, in the family Mitridae, the miters or miter snails.
