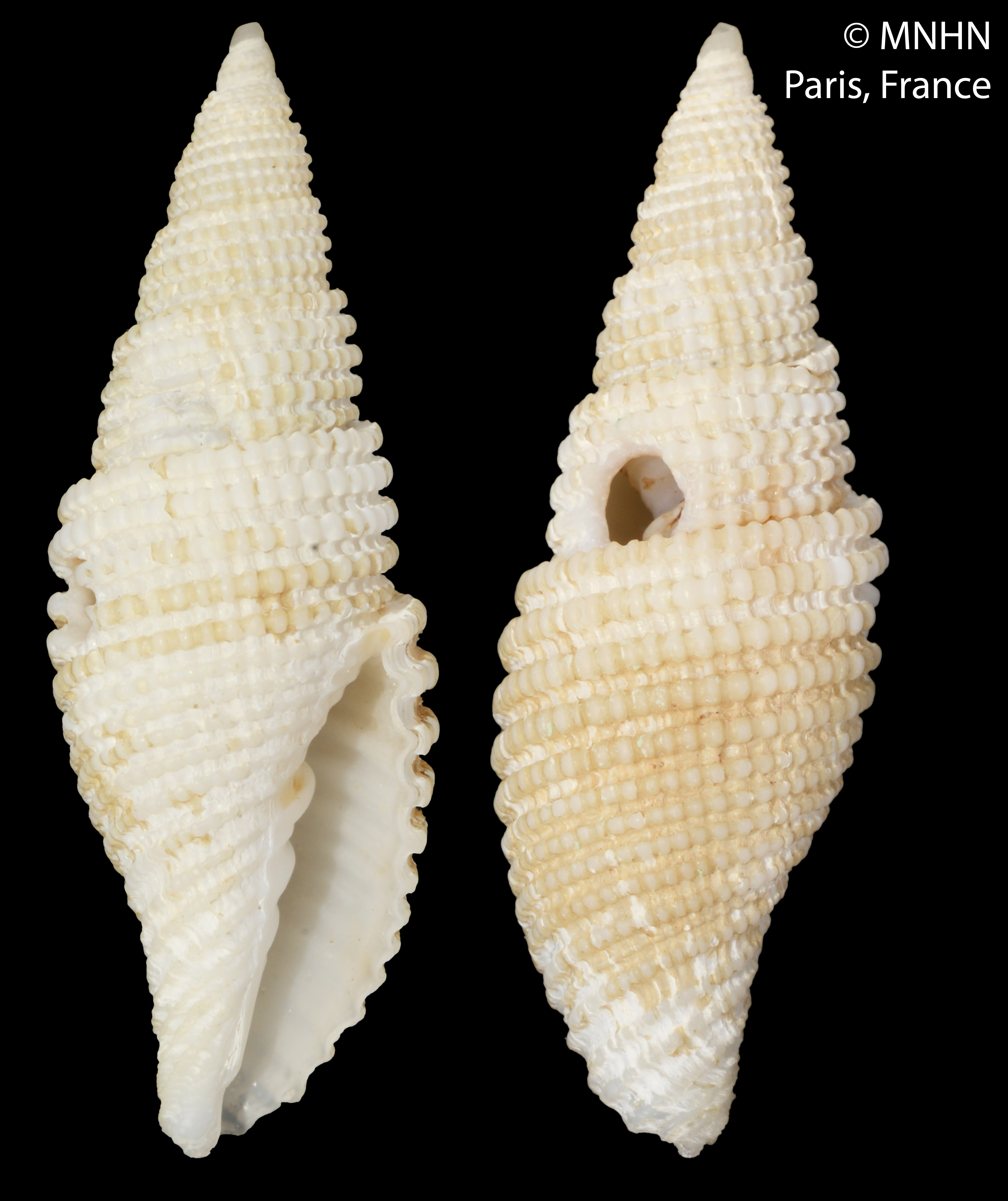
- Shell of Fusidomiporta ponderi (holotype at MNHN, Paris)

Scientific classification
- Kingdom: Animalia
- Phylum: Mollusca
- Class: Gastropoda
- Subclass: Caenogastropoda
- Order: Neogastropoda
- Superfamily: Mitroidea
- Family: Mitridae
- Subfamily: Mitrinae
- Genus: Fusidomiporta
- Species: F. ponderi

Binomial name
- Fusidomiporta ponderi Fedosov, Herrmann, Kantor & Bouchet, 2018

= Fusidomiporta ponderi =

Species of gastropod

Fusidomiporta ponderi is a species of sea snail, a marine gastropod mollusk, in the family Mitridae, the miters or miter snails.

== Description ==
The shell attains a length of 20 mm to 30 mm.

== Distribution ==
This species occurs in Papua New Guinea.
