= Charitodoron alcyone =

Scientific classification
- Kingdom: Animalia
- Phylum: Mollusca
- Class: Gastropoda
- Subclass: Caenogastropoda
- Order: Neogastropoda
- Superfamily: Mitroidea
- Family: Charitodoronidae
- Genus: Charitodoron
- Species: C. alcyone

Binomial name
- Charitodoron alcyone Lussi, 2009

Species of gastropod

Charitodoron alcyone is a species of sea snail, a marine gastropod mollusk in the family Charitodoronidae.
