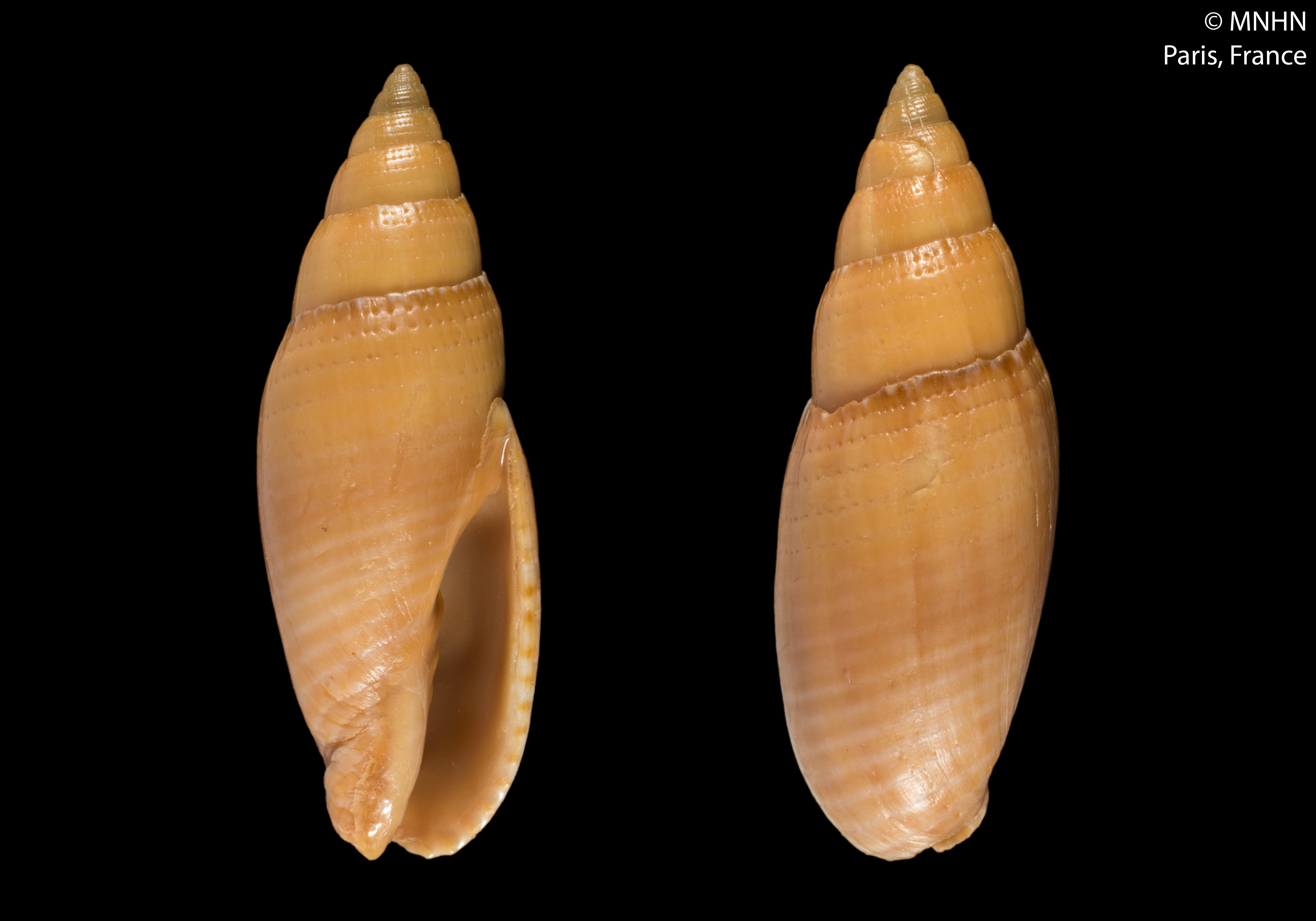
- Shell of Quasimitra roselineae (holotype at MNHN, Paris)

Scientific classification
- Kingdom: Animalia
- Phylum: Mollusca
- Class: Gastropoda
- Subclass: Caenogastropoda
- Order: Neogastropoda
- Superfamily: Mitroidea
- Family: Mitridae
- Subfamily: Mitrinae
- Genus: Quasimitra
- Species: Q. roselineae

Binomial name
- Quasimitra roselineae (Martin & Salisbury, 2013)

Synonyms
- Mitra (Mitra) roselineae Martin & Salisbury, 2013; Mitra roselineae Martin & Salisbury, 2013

= Quasimitra roselineae =

Species of gastropod

Quasimitra roselineae is a species of sea snail, a marine gastropod mollusk, in the family Mitridae, the miters or miter snails.

== Description ==
The length of the shell attains 34.9 mm.

== Distribution ==
This species occurs in the Indian Ocean of Somalia.
