= Cancillopsis liliformis =

Scientific classification
- Kingdom: Animalia
- Phylum: Mollusca
- Class: Gastropoda
- Subclass: Caenogastropoda
- Order: Neogastropoda
- Superfamily: Mitroidea
- Family: Mitridae
- Subfamily: Mitrinae
- Genus: Cancillopsis
- Species: C. liliformis

Binomial name
- Cancillopsis liliformis Huang & Salisbury, 2017

Synonyms
- Cancilla liliformis S.-I Huang & R. Salisbury, 2017 (original combination)

Species of gastropod

Cancillopsis liliformis is a species of sea snail, a marine gastropod mollusk, in the family Mitridae, the miters or miter snails.

== Distribution ==
This species occurs in the following locations:

- Philippines
- Taiwan Strait
