= Eumitra nitens =

Scientific classification
- Kingdom: Animalia
- Phylum: Mollusca
- Class: Gastropoda
- Subclass: Caenogastropoda
- Order: Neogastropoda
- Superfamily: Mitroidea
- Family: Mitridae
- Subfamily: Mitrinae
- Genus: Eumitra
- Species: †E. nitens

Binomial name
- †Eumitra nitens (P. Marshall, 1918)

Synonyms
- †Cymbiola masefieldi P. Marshall, 1918; †Cymbiola nitens P. Marshall, 1918

Extinct species of gastropod

Eumitra nitens is an extinct species of sea snail, a marine gastropod mollusk, in the family Mitridae, the miters or miter snails.

== Distribution ==
This species occurs in New Zealand.
