= Quasimitra rinaldii =

Scientific classification
- Kingdom: Animalia
- Phylum: Mollusca
- Class: Gastropoda
- Subclass: Caenogastropoda
- Order: Neogastropoda
- Superfamily: Mitroidea
- Family: Mitridae
- Subfamily: Mitrinae
- Genus: Quasimitra
- Species: Q. rinaldii

Binomial name
- Quasimitra rinaldii (H. Turner, 1993)

Synonyms
- Mitra (Mitra) rinaldii H. Turner, 1993; Mitra rinaldii H. Turner, 1993

Species of gastropod

Quasimitra rinaldii is a species of sea snail, a marine gastropod mollusk, in the family Mitridae, the miters or miter snails.
