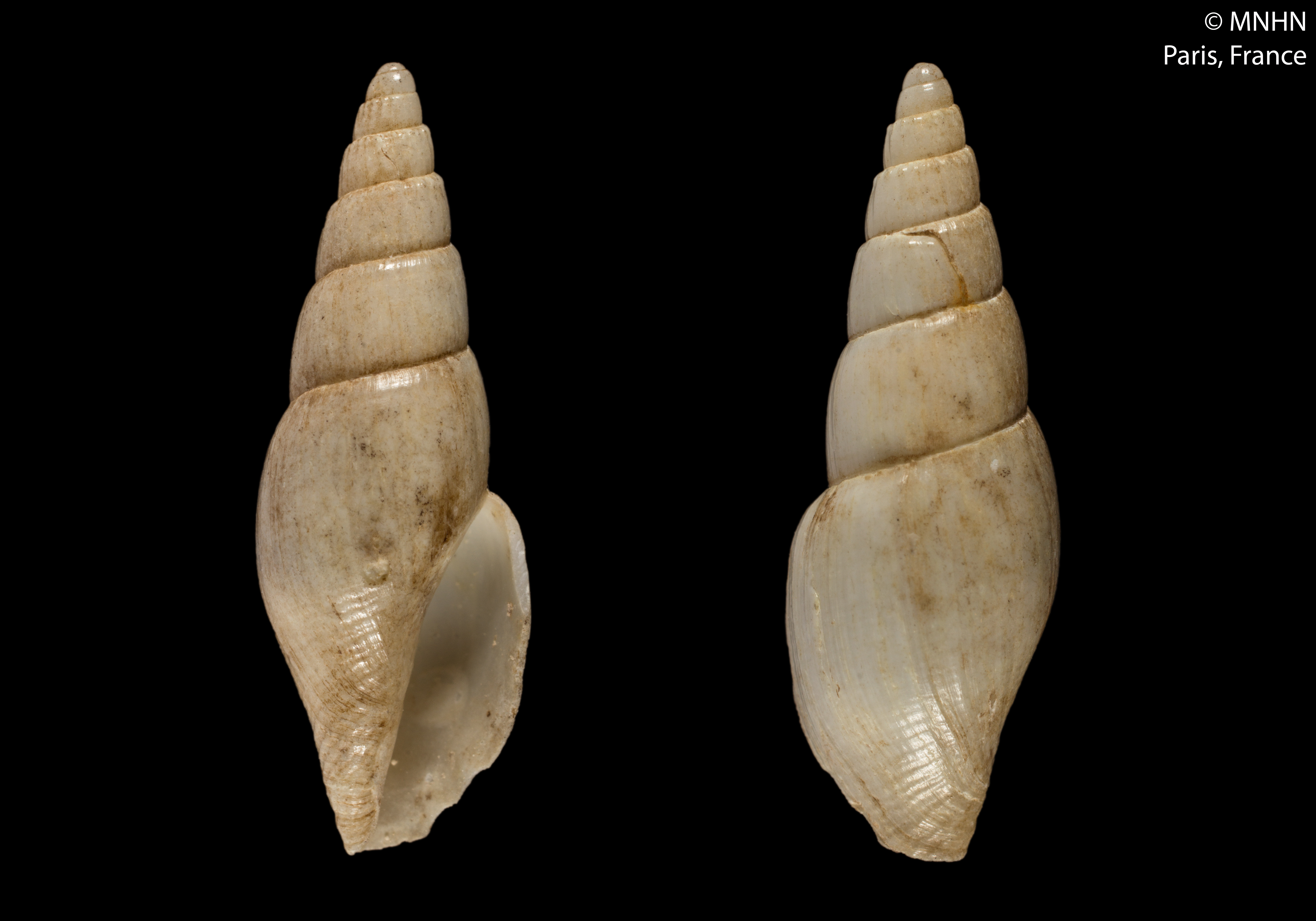
- Shell of Eumitra richeri (holotype at MNHN, Paris)

Scientific classification
- Kingdom: Animalia
- Phylum: Mollusca
- Class: Gastropoda
- Subclass: Caenogastropoda
- Order: Neogastropoda
- Superfamily: Mitroidea
- Family: Mitridae
- Subfamily: Mitrinae
- Genus: Eumitra
- Species: E. richeri

Binomial name
- Eumitra richeri Lozouet, 1991

= Eumitra richeri =

Species of gastropod

Eumitra richeri is a species of sea snail, a marine gastropod mollusk, in the family Mitridae, the miters or miter snails.

== Description ==
The length of the shell attains 19.7 mm.

== Distribution ==
This species occurs in the Coral Sea, near the western part of Australia, as well as near New Caledonia.
