= Cancillopsis acuminata =

Scientific classification
- Kingdom: Animalia
- Phylum: Mollusca
- Class: Gastropoda
- Subclass: Caenogastropoda
- Order: Neogastropoda
- Superfamily: Mitroidea
- Family: Mitridae
- Subfamily: Mitrinae
- Genus: Cancillopsis
- Species: †C. acuminata

Binomial name
- †Cancillopsis acuminata (Shuto, 1969)

Synonyms
- †Cancilla acuminata (Shuto, 1969); †Tiara acuminata Shuto, 1969

Extinct species of gastropod

Cancillopsis acuminata is an extinct species of sea snail, a marine gastropod mollusk, in the family Mitridae, the miters or miter snails.
