= Quasimitra propinqua =

Scientific classification
- Kingdom: Animalia
- Phylum: Mollusca
- Class: Gastropoda
- Subclass: Caenogastropoda
- Order: Neogastropoda
- Superfamily: Mitroidea
- Family: Mitridae
- Subfamily: Mitrinae
- Genus: Quasimitra
- Species: Q. propinqua

Binomial name
- Quasimitra propinqua (A. Adams, 1853)

Synonyms
- Mitra (Mitra) propinqua A. Adams, 1853; Mitra propinqua A. Adams, 1853

Species of gastropod

Quasimitra propinqua is a species of sea snail, a marine gastropod mollusk, in the family Mitridae, the miters or miter snails.
