= Quasimitra nympha =

Scientific classification
- Kingdom: Animalia
- Phylum: Mollusca
- Class: Gastropoda
- Subclass: Caenogastropoda
- Order: Neogastropoda
- Superfamily: Mitroidea
- Family: Mitridae
- Subfamily: Mitrinae
- Genus: Quasimitra
- Species: Q. nympha

Binomial name
- Quasimitra nympha (Reeve, 1845)

Synonyms
- Mitra nympha Reeve, 1845

Species of gastropod

Quasimitra nympha is a species of sea snail, a marine gastropod mollusk, in the family Mitridae, the miters or miter snails.
