= Quasimitra lamarckii =

Scientific classification
- Kingdom: Animalia
- Phylum: Mollusca
- Class: Gastropoda
- Subclass: Caenogastropoda
- Order: Neogastropoda
- Superfamily: Mitroidea
- Family: Mitridae
- Subfamily: Mitrinae
- Genus: Quasimitra
- Species: Q. lamarckii

Binomial name
- Quasimitra lamarckii (Deshayes, 1832)

Synonyms
- Mitra (Mitra) lamarckii Deshayes, 1832; Mitra lamarckii Deshayes, 1832

Species of gastropod

Quasimitra lamarckii is a species of sea snail, a marine gastropod mollusk, in the family Mitridae, the miters or miter snails.
