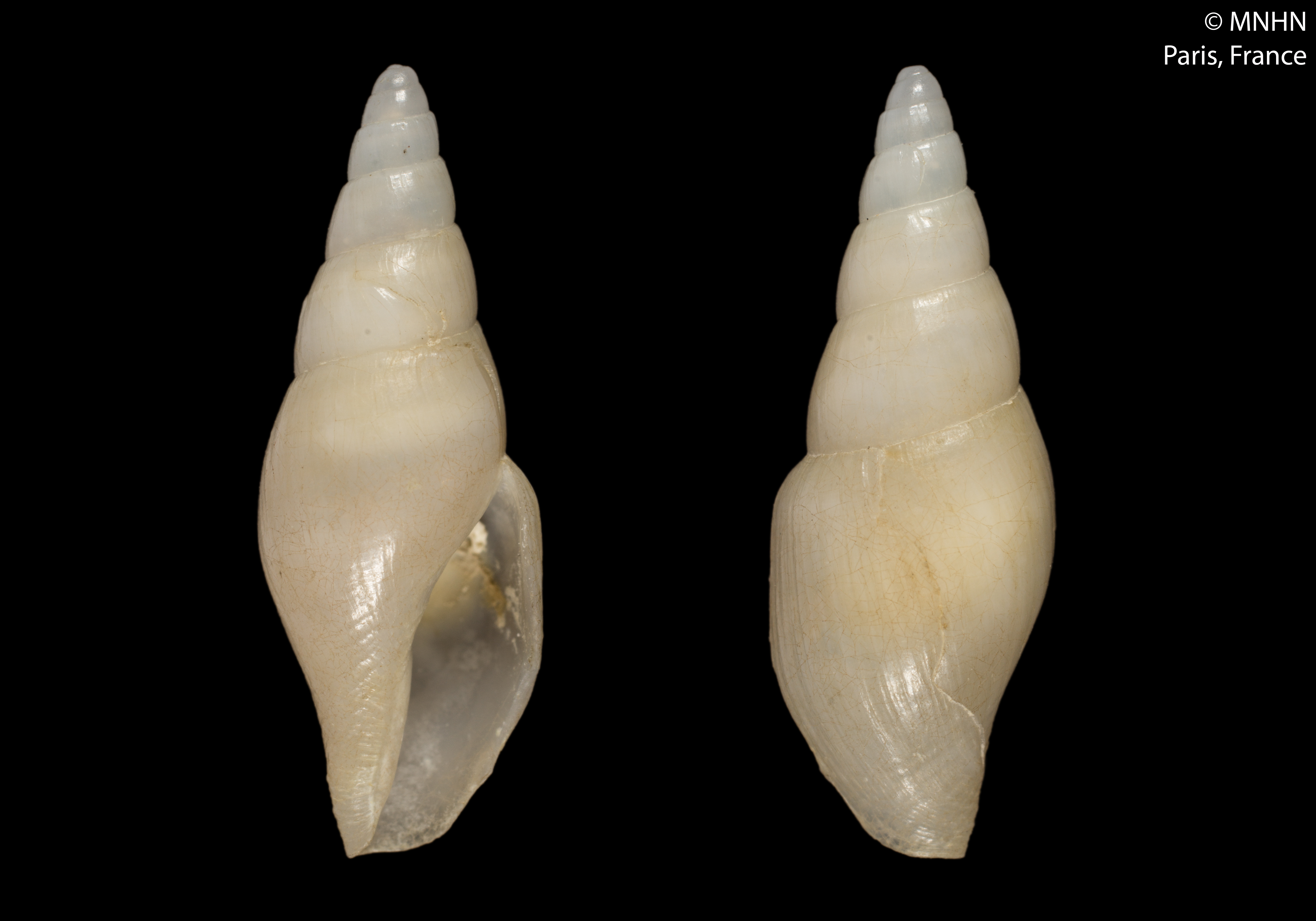
- Shell of Eumitra apheles (holotype at MNHN, Paris)

Scientific classification
- Kingdom: Animalia
- Phylum: Mollusca
- Class: Gastropoda
- Subclass: Caenogastropoda
- Order: Neogastropoda
- Superfamily: Mitroidea
- Family: Mitridae
- Subfamily: Mitrinae
- Genus: Eumitra
- Species: E. apheles

Binomial name
- Eumitra apheles Lozouet, 1991

= Eumitra apheles =

Species of gastropod

Eumitra apheles is a species of sea snail, a marine gastropod mollusk, in the family Mitridae, the miters or miter snails.

== Description ==
The length of the shell attains 15.6 mm.

== Distribution ==
This marine species occurs off New Caledonia.
