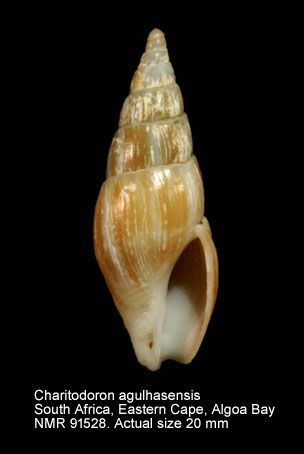

Scientific classification
- Kingdom: Animalia
- Phylum: Mollusca
- Class: Gastropoda
- Subclass: Caenogastropoda
- Order: Neogastropoda
- Superfamily: Mitroidea
- Family: Charitodoronidae
- Genus: Charitodoron
- Species: C. agulhasensis

Binomial name
- Charitodoron agulhasensis (Thiele, 1925)

Synonyms
- Charitodoron aglaia Tomlin, 1932; Columbella agulhasensis Thiele, 1925 (original combination)

= Charitodoron agulhasensis =

Species of gastropod

Charitodoron agulhasensis is a rare species of sea snail, a marine gastropod mollusk in the family Charitodoronidae, the miters or miter snails. Its shells are available for sale. It originates from southern regions of the globe such as South Africa and Australia.

== Description ==
About an inch long shell similar to a conch with loops going around it. Usually white/brown in color.

== Distribution ==
Mostly found around South Africa's Agulhas Bay. This is also the origin of its taxonomic name.
