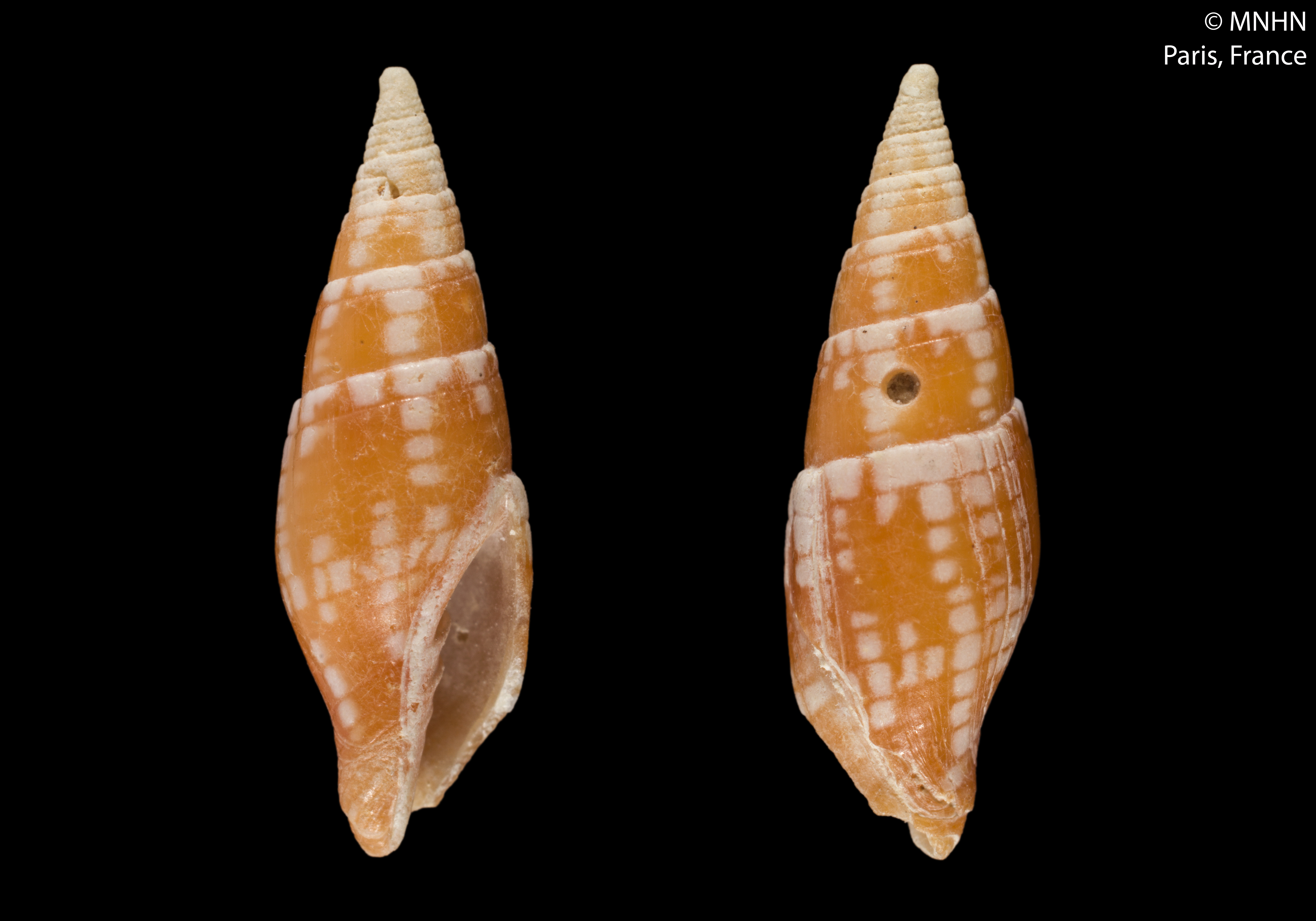
- Shell of Quasimitra structilis (holotype at MNHN, Paris)

Scientific classification
- Kingdom: Animalia
- Phylum: Mollusca
- Class: Gastropoda
- Subclass: Caenogastropoda
- Order: Neogastropoda
- Family: Mitridae
- Subfamily: Mitrinae
- Genus: Quasimitra
- Species: Q. structilis

Binomial name
- Quasimitra structilis (Herrmann & Salisbury, 2013)

Synonyms
- Mitra structilis Herrmann & Salisbury, 2013

= Quasimitra structilis =

Species of gastropod

Quasimitra structilis is a species of sea snail, a marine gastropod mollusk, in the family Mitridae, the miters or miter snails.

== Description ==
=== External Shell and Structure ===
The length of the shell attains 14 mm. The shell is fusiform and has a high spire and a short siphonal canal. Photos of Q. structilis specimens show one gently rounded large body whorl with approximately 6 slightly convex whorls comprising the conical spire of the shell. Between whorls there is an abrupt suture. The shell is primarily a rust orange color with axial bands of inconsistent cuboid white beads. The whorls of the protoconch are almost entirely white. 3-4 columellar folds are visible through the aperture opening. The aperture is lanceolate, coming to a point at the anal sulcus.

=== Live Snail ===
Miter snails possess a rachiglossate (having three denticles) radula, which is used for acquiring prey. They also have an elongated proboscis and a large foot.

== Distribution and Habitat ==
This marine species occurs off the Austral Islands, French Polynesia. The depth of only one specimen is documented, at around 925 meters below the surface. Q. structilis is a marine benthic species.

== Life Habits ==
=== Diet ===
Q. structilis is a predator.

=== Reproduction ===
This species reproduces sexually.

=== Locomotion ===
Q. structilis moves by mucus mediated gliding.
