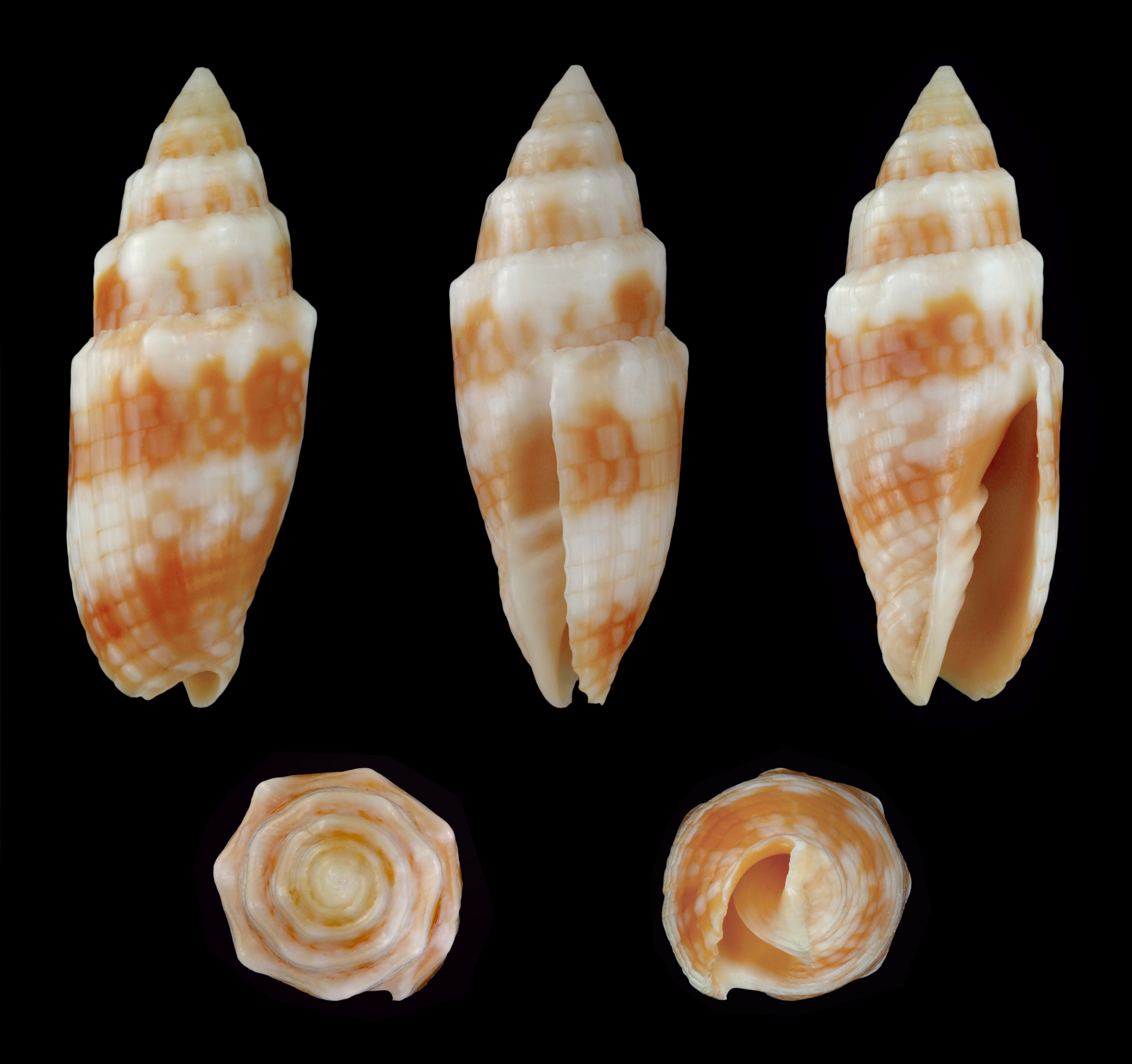

Scientific classification
- Kingdom: Animalia
- Phylum: Mollusca
- Class: Gastropoda
- Subclass: Caenogastropoda
- Order: Neogastropoda
- Family: Mitridae
- Subfamily: Mitrinae
- Genus: Quasimitra
- Species: Q. bovei

Binomial name
- Quasimitra bovei Kiener, 1838

Synonyms
- Mitra (Mitra) bovei Kiener, 1838; Mitra bovei Kiener, 1838

= Quasimitra bovei =

Species of gastropod

Quasimitra bovei is a species of sea snail, a marine gastropod mollusk in the family Mitridae, the miters or miter snails.

== Description ==
The length of the shell attains 50.6 mm.

== Distribution ==
This species occurs in the Red Sea.
