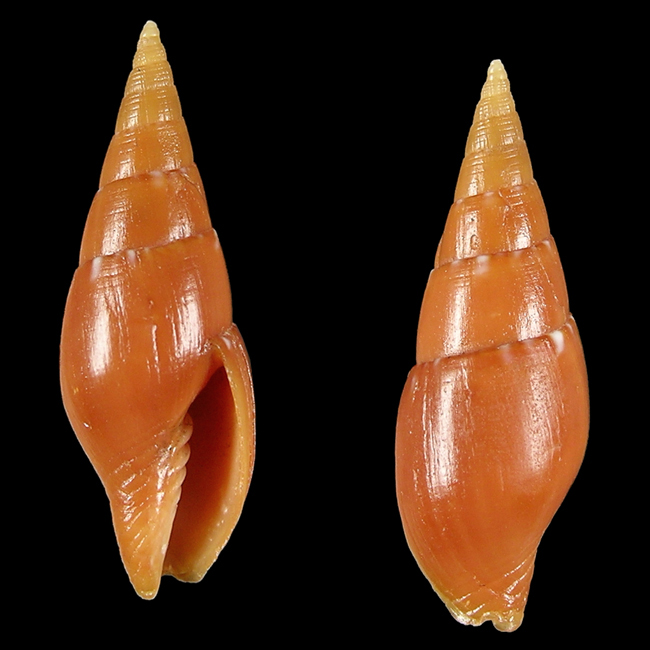

Scientific classification
- Kingdom: Animalia
- Phylum: Mollusca
- Class: Gastropoda
- Subclass: Caenogastropoda
- Order: Neogastropoda
- Family: Mitridae
- Subfamily: Mitrinae
- Genus: Quasimitra
- Species: Q. sarmientoi

Binomial name
- Quasimitra sarmientoi (Poppe, 2008)

Synonyms
- Mitra sarmientoi Poppe, 2008

= Quasimitra sarmientoi =

Species of gastropod

Quasimitra sarmientoi is a species of sea snail, a marine gastropod mollusk in the family Mitridae, the miters or miter snails.

== Description ==
The length of the shell attains 8 mm.

== Distribution ==
This marine species occurs off the Philippines.
