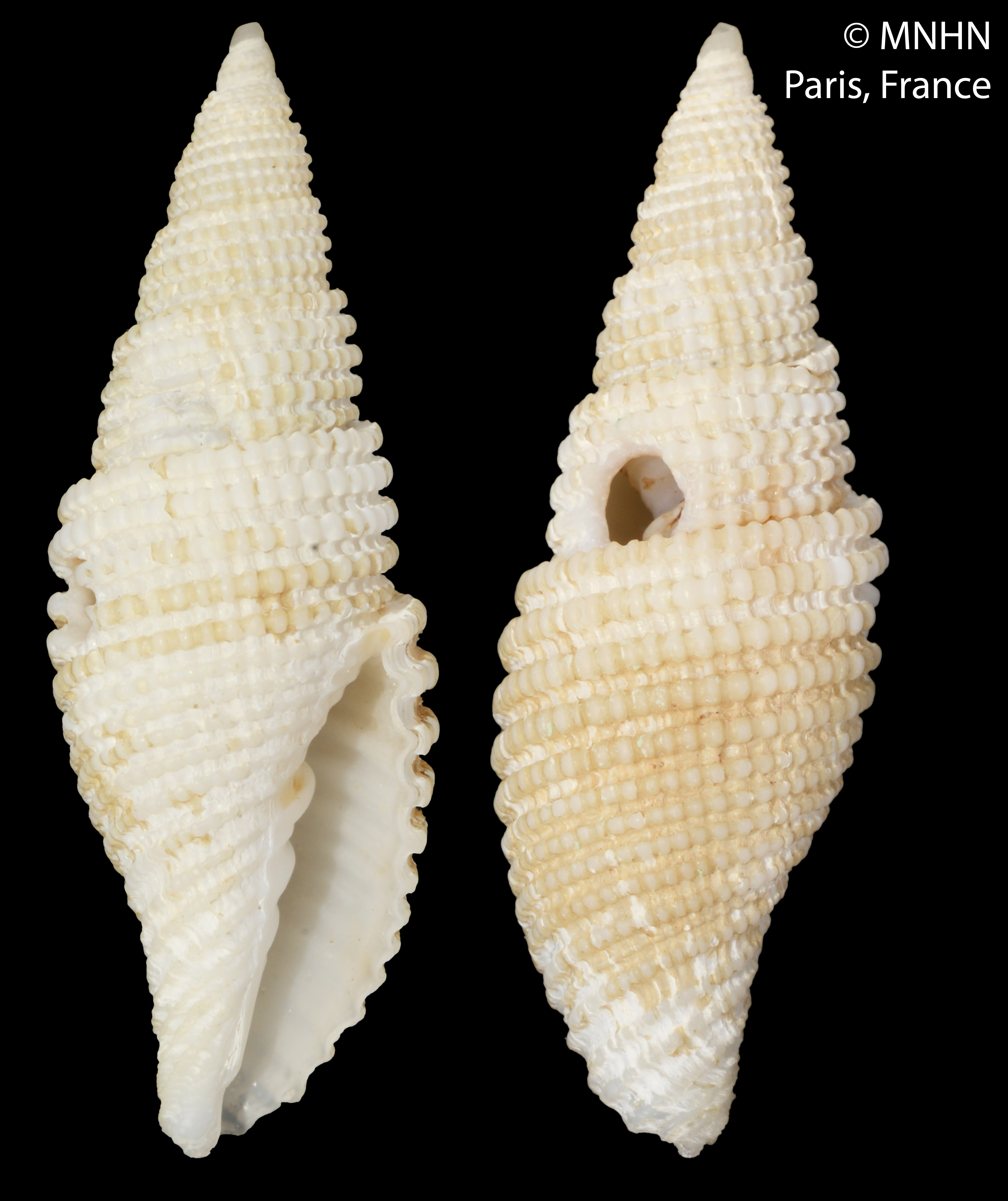
- Shell of Fusidomiporta ponderi

Scientific classification
- Kingdom: Animalia
- Phylum: Mollusca
- Class: Gastropoda
- Subclass: Caenogastropoda
- Order: Neogastropoda
- Superfamily: Mitroidea
- Family: Mitridae
- Subfamily: Mitrinae
- Genus: Fusidomiporta; Fedosov, Herrmann, Kantor & Bouchet, 2018

Type species
- Fusidomiporta ponderi Fedosov, Herrmann, Kantor & Bouchet, 2018

Species
- See text

= Fusidomiporta =

Genus of gastropods

Fusidomiporta is a genus of sea snails, marine gastropod mollusks in the family Mitridae.

== Species ==
Species within the genus Fusidomiporta include:

- Fusidomiporta ponderi Fedosov, Herrmann, Kantor & Bouchet, 2018
- Fusidomiporta suturata (Reeve, 1845)
