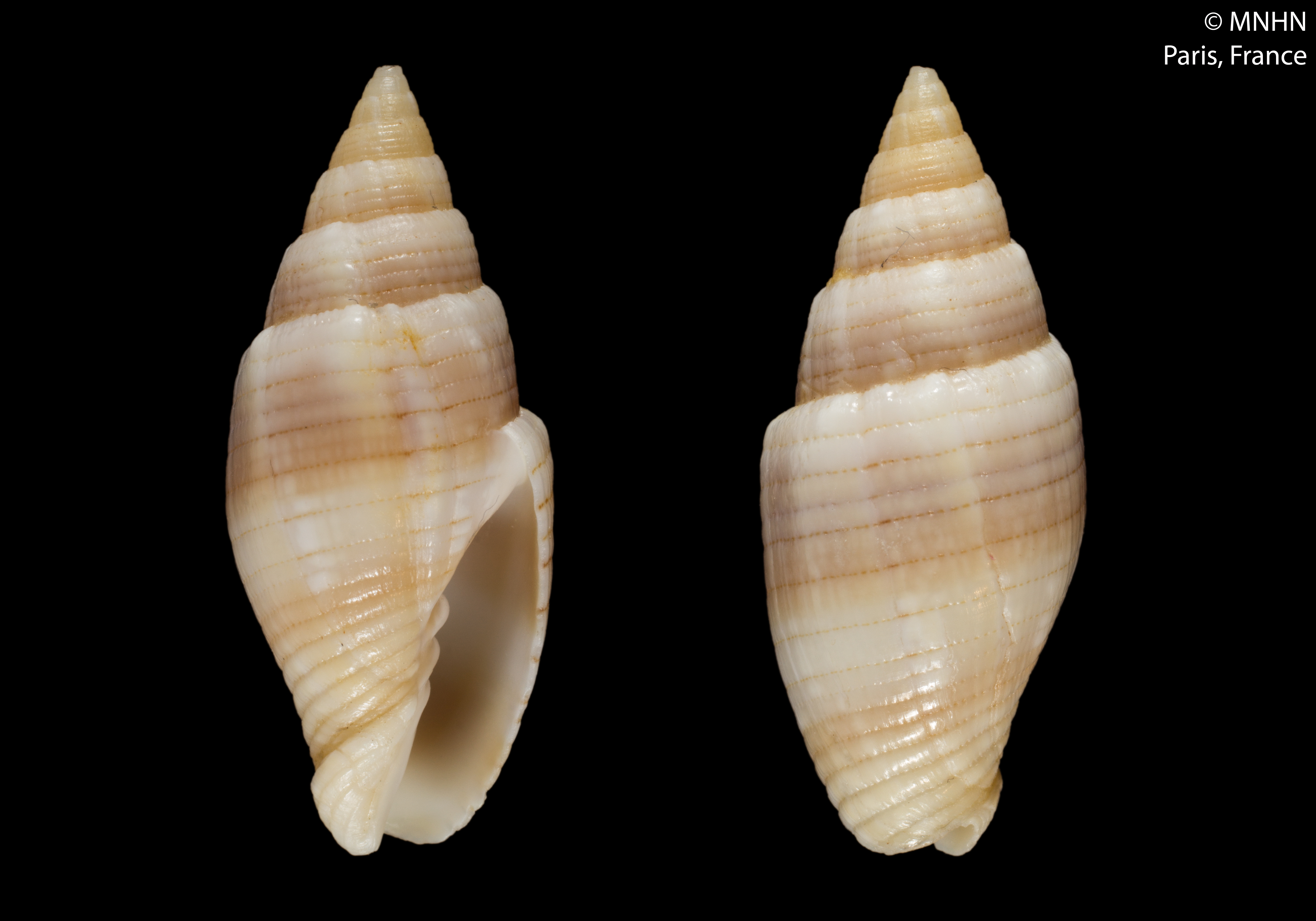
- Shell of Quasimitra albocarnea (holotype at MNHN, Paris)

Scientific classification
- Kingdom: Animalia
- Phylum: Mollusca
- Class: Gastropoda
- Subclass: Caenogastropoda
- Order: Neogastropoda
- Family: Mitridae
- Subfamily: Mitrinae
- Genus: Quasimitra
- Species: Q. albocarnea

Binomial name
- Quasimitra albocarnea (Bozzetti, 2016)

Synonyms
- Mitra albocarnea Bozzetti, 2016

= Quasimitra albocarnea =

Species of gastropod

Quasimitra albocarnea is a species of sea snail, a marine gastropod mollusk, in the family Mitridae, the miters or miter snails.

== Description ==
The shell reaches 25.8 mm in length. The holotype, collected at Ras Hafun in northeastern Somalia, is deposited in the mollusc collection of the Muséum national d'Histoire naturelle in Paris (MNHN-IM-2000-31698).

== Distribution ==
This species occurs in the Indian Ocean off Somalia.
