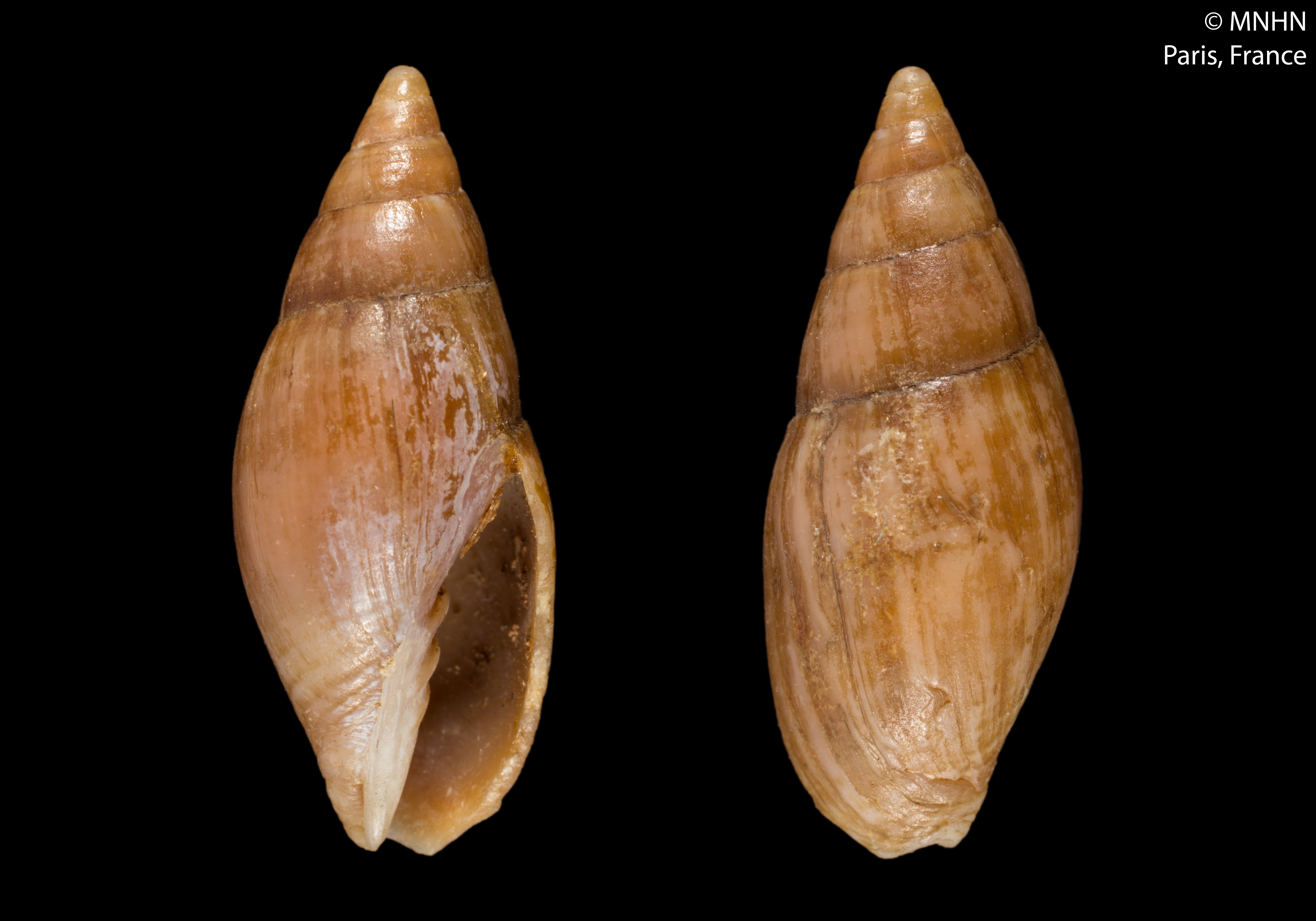
- Shell of Episcomitra cornicula

Scientific classification
- Kingdom: Animalia
- Phylum: Mollusca
- Class: Gastropoda
- Subclass: Caenogastropoda
- Order: Neogastropoda
- Superfamily: Mitroidea
- Family: Mitridae
- Subfamily: Mitrinae
- Genus: Episcomitra; Monterosato, 1917

Type species
- Mitra zonata Marryat, 1819

Species
- See text

Synonyms
- Mitra (Episcomitra) Monterosato, 1917

= Episcomitra =

Genus of gastropods

Episcomitra is a genus of sea snails, marine gastropod mollusks in the family Mitridae.

== Species ==
Species within the genus Episcomitra include:

- Episcomitra cornicula (Linnaeus, 1758)
- Episcomitra zonata (Marryat, 1818)
