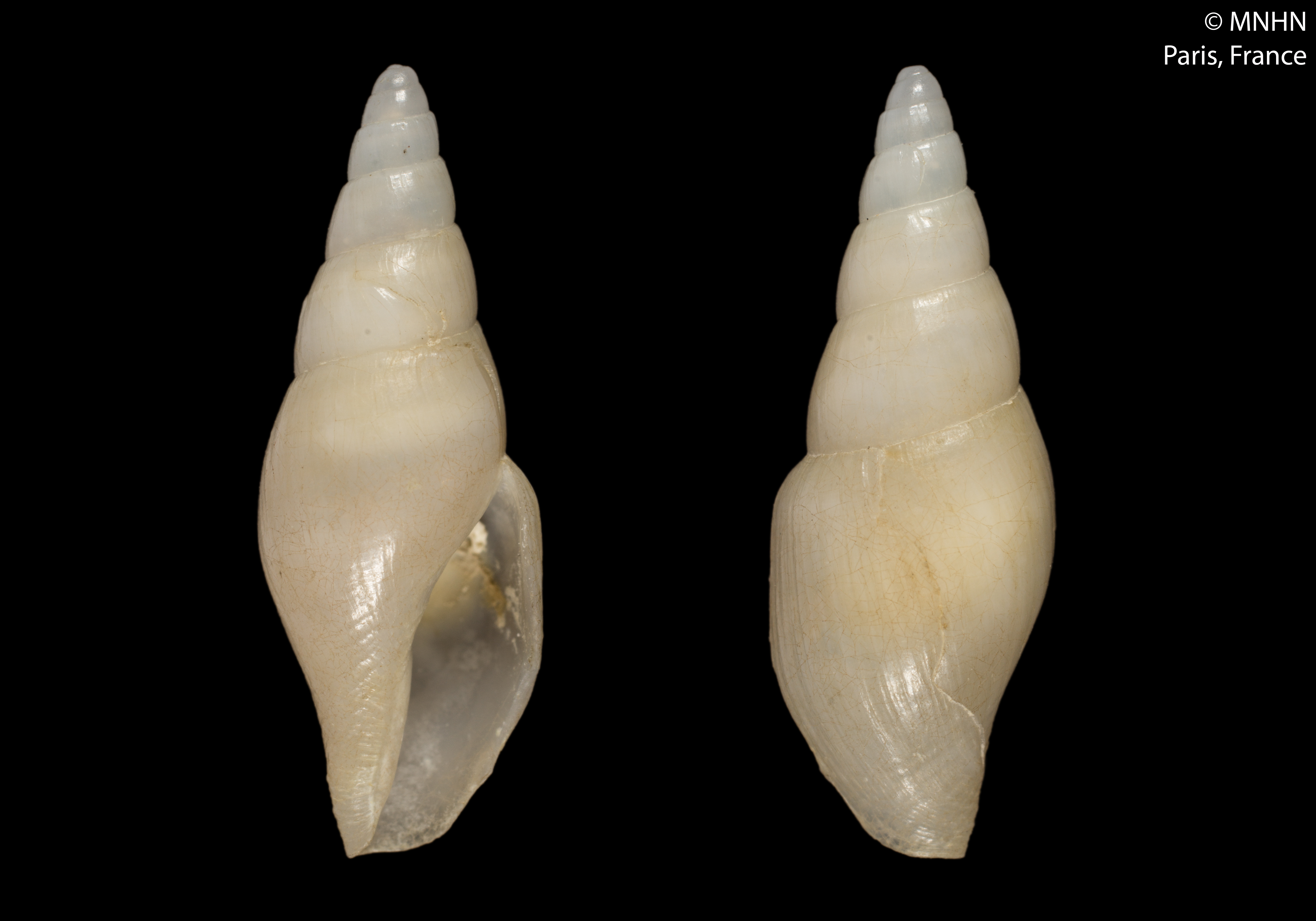
- Shell of Eumitra apheles

Scientific classification
- Kingdom: Animalia
- Phylum: Mollusca
- Class: Gastropoda
- Subclass: Caenogastropoda
- Order: Neogastropoda
- Superfamily: Mitroidea
- Family: Mitridae
- Subfamily: Mitrinae
- Genus: Eumitra; Tate, 1889

Type species
- † Mitra alokiza Tenison Woods, 1879

Synonyms
- † Diplomitra Finlay, 1926; Mitra (Eumitra) Tate, 1889

= Eumitra =

Genus of gastropods

Eumitra is a genus of sea snails, marine gastropod mollusks, in the family Mitridae, the miters or miter snails.

== Species ==
Species within the genus Eumitra include:

- † Eumitra alokiza (Tenison Woods, 1879)
- Eumitra apheles Lozouet, 1991
- Eumitra caledonica Lozouet, 1991
- Eumitra imbricata Lozouet, 1991
- † Eumitra nitens (P. Marshall, 1918)
- Eumitra richeri Lozouet, 1991
- Eumitra suduirauti Bozzetti, 1997
- † Eumitra uniplica (Tate, 1889)
- † Eumitra waitemataensis (Powell & Bartrum, 1929)
