= Cancillopsis =

Scientific classification
- Kingdom: Animalia
- Phylum: Mollusca
- Class: Gastropoda
- Subclass: Caenogastropoda
- Order: Neogastropoda
- Superfamily: Mitroidea
- Family: Mitridae
- Subfamily: Mitrinae
- Genus: Cancillopsis; Fedosov, Herrmann, Kantor & Bouchet, 2018

Genus of gastropods

Cancillopsis is a genus of sea snails, marine gastropod mollusks, in the family Mitridae, the miters or miter snails.

== Species ==
Species within the genus Cancillopsis include:

- † Cancillopsis acuminata (Shuto, 1969)
- Cancillopsis chuoi (S.-I Huang & R. Salisbury, 2017)
- Cancillopsis liliformis (S.-I Huang & R. Salisbury, 2017)
- Cancillopsis meimiaoae (Huang & Salisbury, 2017)
