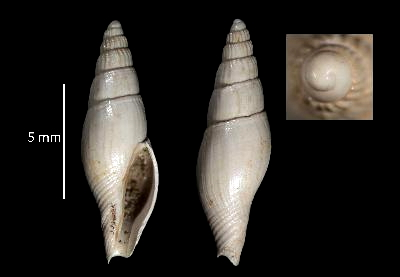
- Shells of †Charitodoron tauzini (paratype at MNHN, Paris)

Scientific classification
- Kingdom: Animalia
- Phylum: Mollusca
- Class: Gastropoda
- Subclass: Caenogastropoda
- Order: Neogastropoda
- Superfamily: Mitroidea
- Family: Charitodoronidae
- Genus: Charitodoron; Tomlin, 1932

Type species
- Charitodoron euphrosyne Tomlin, 1932

Species
- See text

= Charitodoron =

Genus of gastropods

Charitodoron is a genus of sea snails, marine gastropod mollusks in the family Charitodoronidae.

== Species ==
Species within the genus Charitodoron include:

- Charitodoron agulhasensis (Thiele, 1925)
- Charitodoron alcyone Lussi, 2009
- Charitodoron barbara (Thiele, 1925)
- Charitodoron bathybius (Barnard, 1959)
- Charitodoron rosadoi Kilburn, 1995
- † Charitodoron tauzini Lozouet, 1991
- Charitodoron thalia Tomlin, 1932
- Charitodoron veneris (Barnard, 1964)

Species brought into synonymy

- Charitodoron aglaia Tomlin, 1932: synonym of Charitodoron agulhasensis (Thiele, 1925)
- Charitodoron euphrosyne Tomlin, 1932: synonym of Charitodoron barbara (Thiele, 1925)
- Charitodoron pasithea Tomlin, 1943: synonym of Charitodoron thalia Tomlin, 1932
