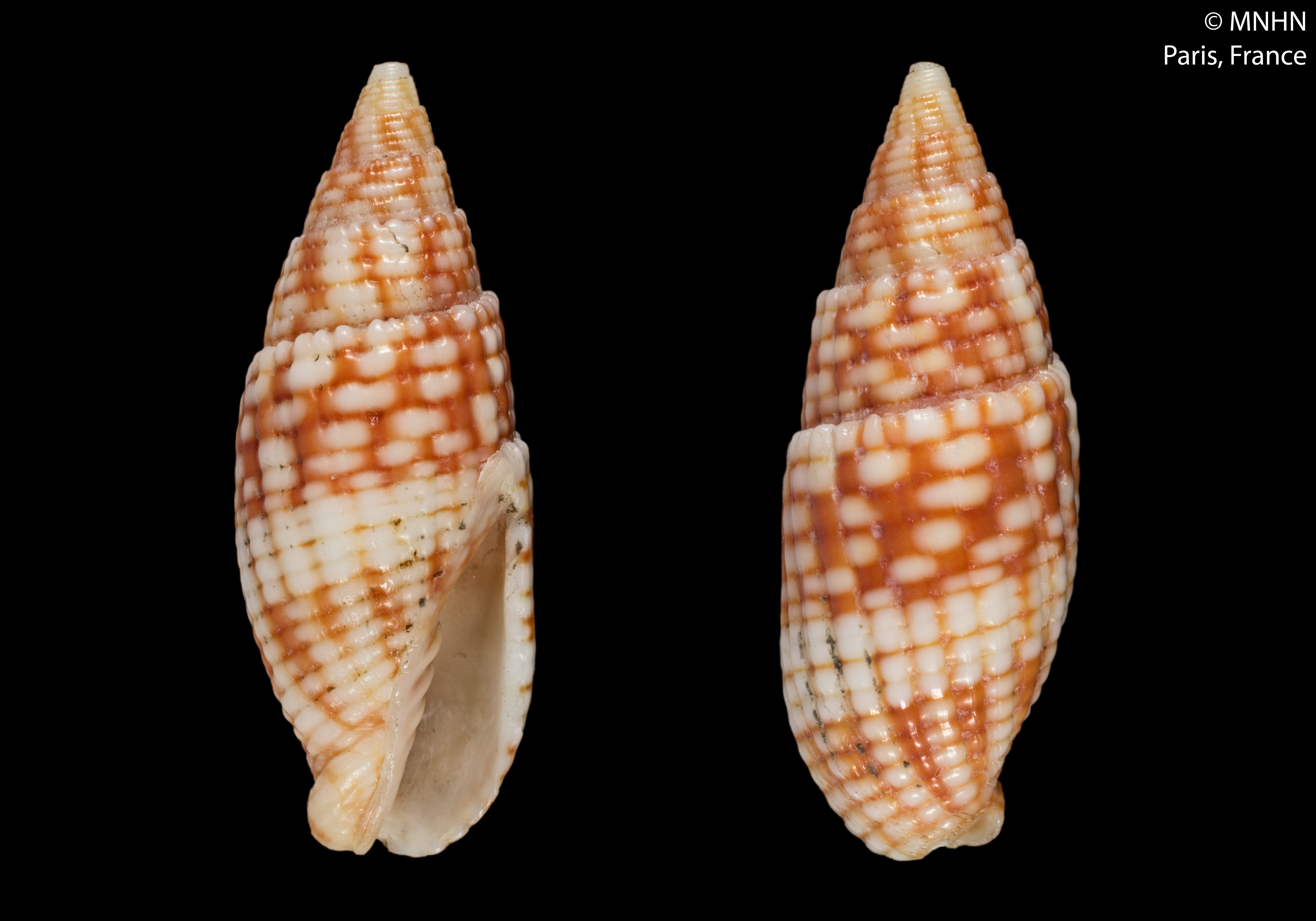
- Shell of Quasimitra sanguinolenta

Scientific classification
- Kingdom: Animalia
- Phylum: Mollusca
- Class: Gastropoda
- Subclass: Caenogastropoda
- Order: Neogastropoda
- Superfamily: Mitroidea
- Family: Mitridae
- Subfamily: Mitrinae
- Genus: Quasimitra; Fedosov, Herrmann, Kantor & Bouchet, 2018

Type species
- Quasimitra sanguinolenta (Lamarck, 1811)

Species
- See text

= Quasimitra =

Genus of gastropods

Quasimitra is a genus of sea snails, marine gastropod mollusks in the subfamily Mitrinae of the family Mitridae.

== Species ==
Species within the genus Quasimitra include:

- Quasimitra albocarnea (Bozzetti, 2016)
- Quasimitra barbieri (Poppe & Tagaro, 2006) (unreplaced junior homonym)
- Quasimitra bovei (Kiener, 1838)
- Quasimitra brettinghami (E. A. Smith, 1906)
- Quasimitra cardinalis (Gmelin, 1791)
- Quasimitra floccata (Reeve, 1844)
- Quasimitra fulgurita (Reeve, 1844)
- Quasimitra lacunosa (Reeve, 1844)
- Quasimitra lamarckii (Deshayes, 1832)
- Quasimitra latruncularia (Reeve, 1844)
- Quasimitra leforti (H. Turner, 2007)
- Quasimitra manuellae (T. Cossignani & V. Cossignani, 2006)
- Quasimitra marmorea (H. Turner, 2007)
- Quasimitra nubila (Gmelin, 1791)
- Quasimitra nympha (Reeve, 1845)
- Quasimitra propinqua (A. Adams, 1853)
- Quasimitra pseudobovei (T. Cossignani & V. Cossignani, 2005)
- Quasimitra puncticulata (Lamarck, 1811)
- Quasimitra punctostriata (Lamarck, 1811)
- Quasimitra raphaeli (Drivas & Jay, 1990)
- Quasimitra rinaldii (H. Turner, 1993)
- Quasimitra roselineae (J. C. Martin & R. Salisbury, 2013)
- Quasimitra rossiae (Reeve, 1844)
- Quasimitra rubrolaterculus R. Aiken & Seccombe, 2019
- Quasimitra sanguinolenta (Lamarck, 1811)
- Quasimitra sarmientoi (Poppe, 2008)
- Quasimitra solida (Reeve, 1844)
- Quasimitra sophiae (Crosse, 1862)
- Quasimitra stossieri (Herrmann, 2016)
- Quasimitra structilis (Herrmann & R. Salisbury, 2013)
- Quasimitra variabilis (Reeve, 1844)

Synonyms

- Quasimitra houarti Dharma, 2021: synonym of Quasimitra stossieri (Herrmann, 2016) (junior subjective synonym)
