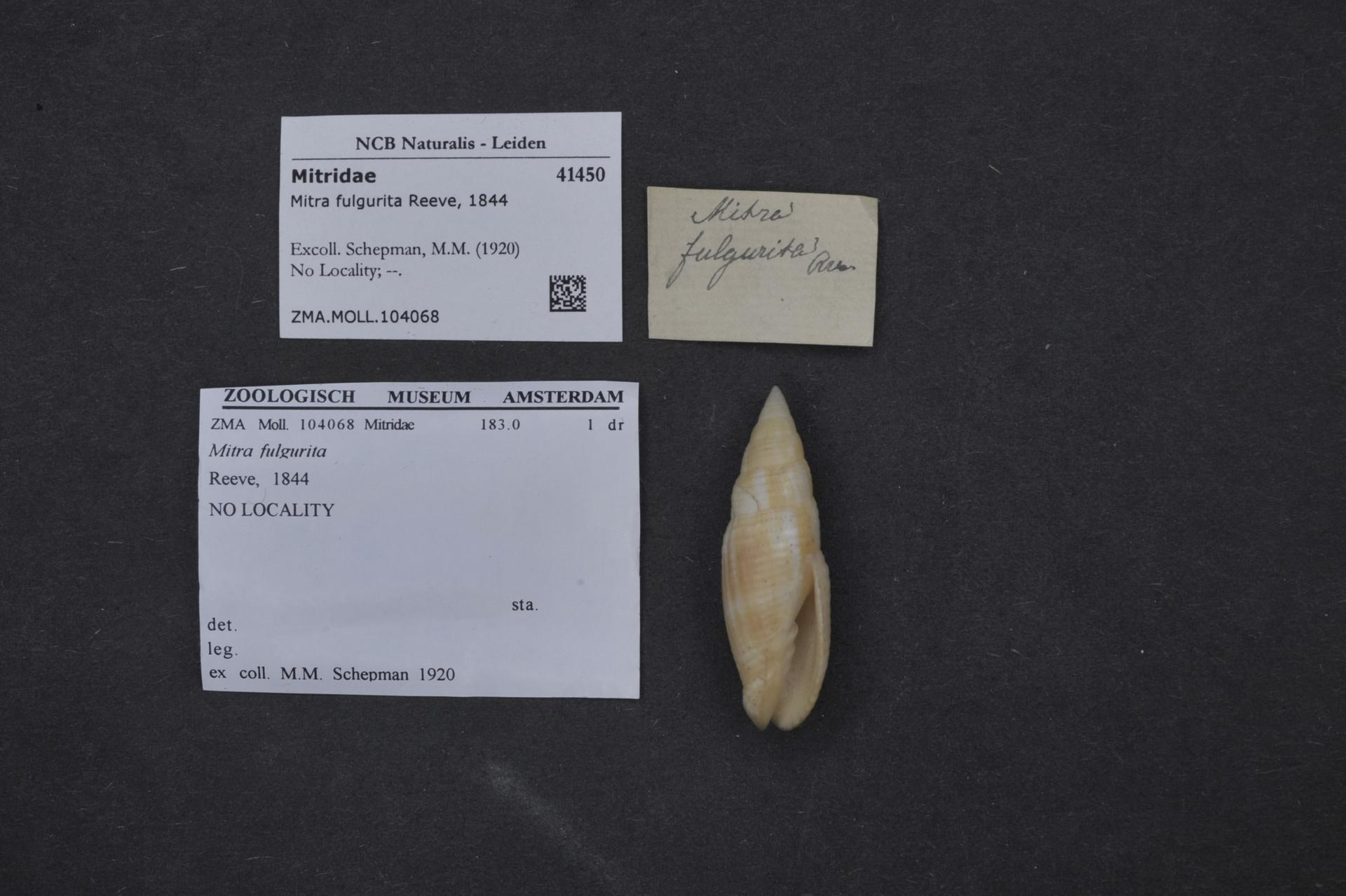

Scientific classification
- Kingdom: Animalia
- Phylum: Mollusca
- Class: Gastropoda
- Subclass: Caenogastropoda
- Order: Neogastropoda
- Family: Mitridae
- Genus: Quasimitra
- Species: Q. fulgurita

Binomial name
- Quasimitra fulgurita (Reeve, 1844)

Synonyms
- Mitra fulgurita Reeve, 1844

= Quasimitra fulgurita =

Species of gastropod

Quasimitra fulgurita is a species of sea snail, a marine gastropod mollusk in the family Mitridae, the miters or miter snails.

== Description ==
Shell size 25 mm.

== Distribution ==
Philippines.
