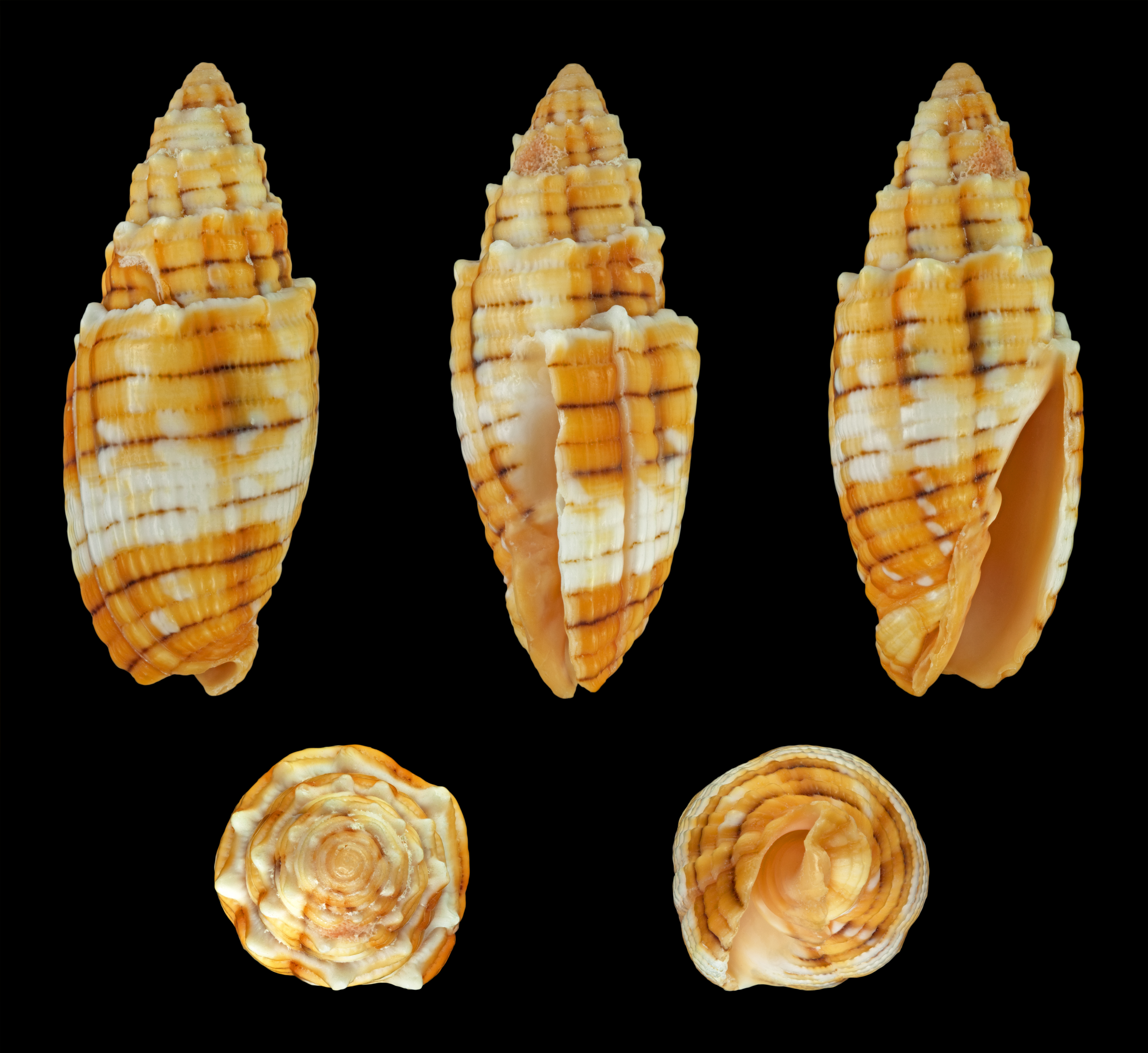

Scientific classification
- Kingdom: Animalia
- Phylum: Mollusca
- Class: Gastropoda
- Subclass: Caenogastropoda
- Order: Neogastropoda
- Family: Mitridae
- Genus: Quasimitra
- Species: Q. puncticulata

Binomial name
- Quasimitra puncticulata (Lamarck, 1811)

Synonyms
- Mitra (Nebularia) puncticulata Lamarck, 1811; Mitra puncticulata Lamarck, 1811

= Quasimitra puncticulata =

Species of gastropod

Quasimitra puncticulata, common name: the punctured mitre, is a species of sea snail, a marine gastropod mollusk in the family Mitridae, the miters or miter snails.

== Description ==
The shell size varies between 25 mm and 57 mm.

== Distribution ==
This species is distributed in the Indian Ocean along Madagascar and in the Central Pacific Ocean along the Philippines, Okinawa, Australia, and Papua New Guinea.
