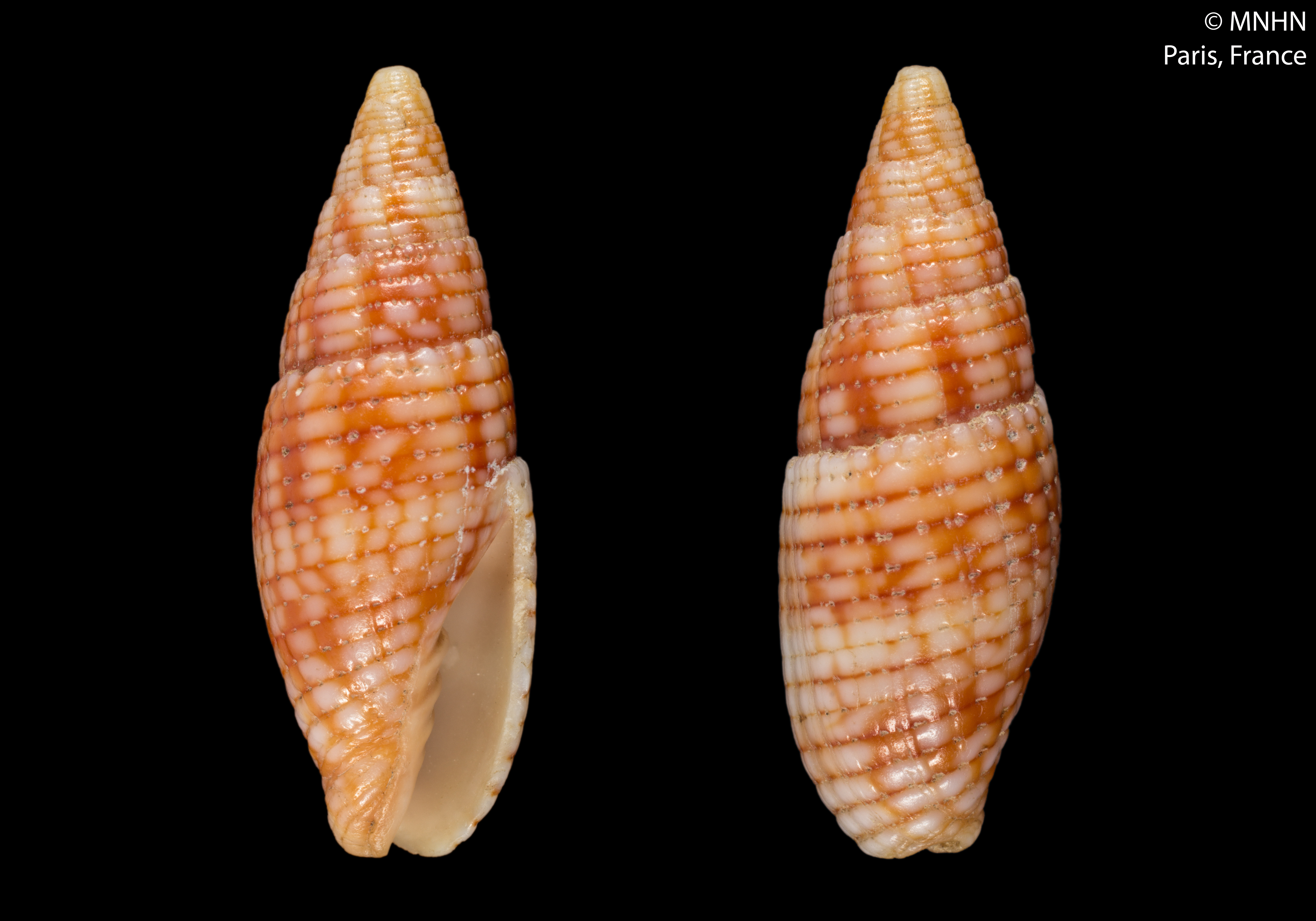
- Shell of Quasimitra sanguinolenta (holotype at MNHN, Paris)

Scientific classification
- Kingdom: Animalia
- Phylum: Mollusca
- Class: Gastropoda
- Subclass: Caenogastropoda
- Order: Neogastropoda
- Family: Mitridae
- Genus: Quasimitra
- Species: Q. sanguinolenta

Binomial name
- Quasimitra sanguinolenta (Lamarck, 1811)

Synonyms
- Mitra (Nebularia) sanguinolenta Lamarck, 1811; Mitra alborufa Bozzetti, 2009; Mitra prosanguinolenta J. Cate, 1966; Mitra sanguinolenta Lamarck, 1811

= Quasimitra sanguinolenta =

Species of gastropod

Quasimitra sanguinolenta is a species of sea snail, a marine gastropod mollusk in the family Mitridae, the miters or miter snails.

== Description ==
The length of the shell attains 27.8 mm.

== Distribution ==
This marine species occurs off Madagascar and Mozambique.
