= Quasimitra barbieri =

Scientific classification
- Kingdom: Animalia
- Phylum: Mollusca
- Class: Gastropoda
- Subclass: Caenogastropoda
- Order: Neogastropoda
- Family: Mitridae
- Genus: Quasimitra
- Species: Q. barbieri

Binomial name
- Quasimitra barbieri (Poppe & Tagaro, 2006)

Synonyms
- Mitra barbieri Poppe & Tagaro, 2006

Species of gastropod

Quasimitra barbieri is a species of sea snail, a marine gastropod mollusc in the family Mitridae, the miters or miter snails.
