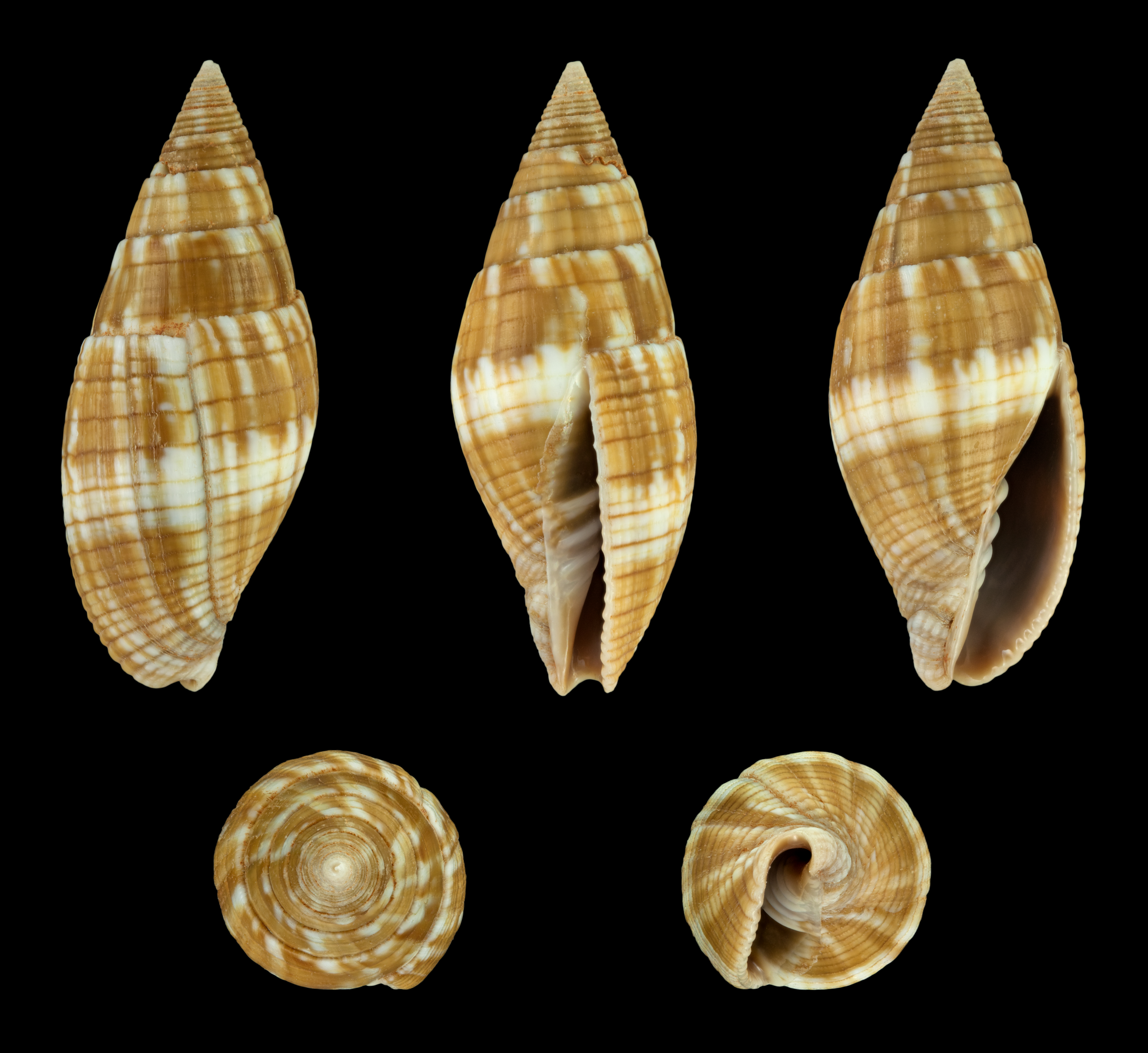

Scientific classification
- Kingdom: Animalia
- Phylum: Mollusca
- Class: Gastropoda
- Subclass: Caenogastropoda
- Order: Neogastropoda
- Family: Mitridae
- Genus: Quasimitra
- Species: Q. variabilis

Binomial name
- Quasimitra variabilis (Reeve, 1844)

Synonyms
- Mitra cylindracea Reeve, 1844; Mitra polymorpha Tomlin, 1920 (unnecessary substitute name for Mitra variabilis, by Tomlin treated as a secondary homonym of Voluta variabilis Link, 1807); Mitra variabilis Reeve, 1844

= Quasimitra variabilis =

Species of gastropod

Quasimitra variabilis, common name: the variable mitre, is a species of sea snail, a marine gastropod mollusk in the family Mitridae, the miters or miter snails.

== Description ==
The shell size varies between 20 mm and 46 mm. Quasimitra variabilis is a marine benthic gastropod that inhabits the sea floor. Its shell is dextrally coiled, or right-handed, and shows variable coloration and patterning. The species has been recorded off the coast of Queensland, Australia, indicating part of its range in the Pacific Ocean.

== Distribution ==
This species occurs in the Indian Ocean off Madagascar and in the Pacific Ocean off Australia.
