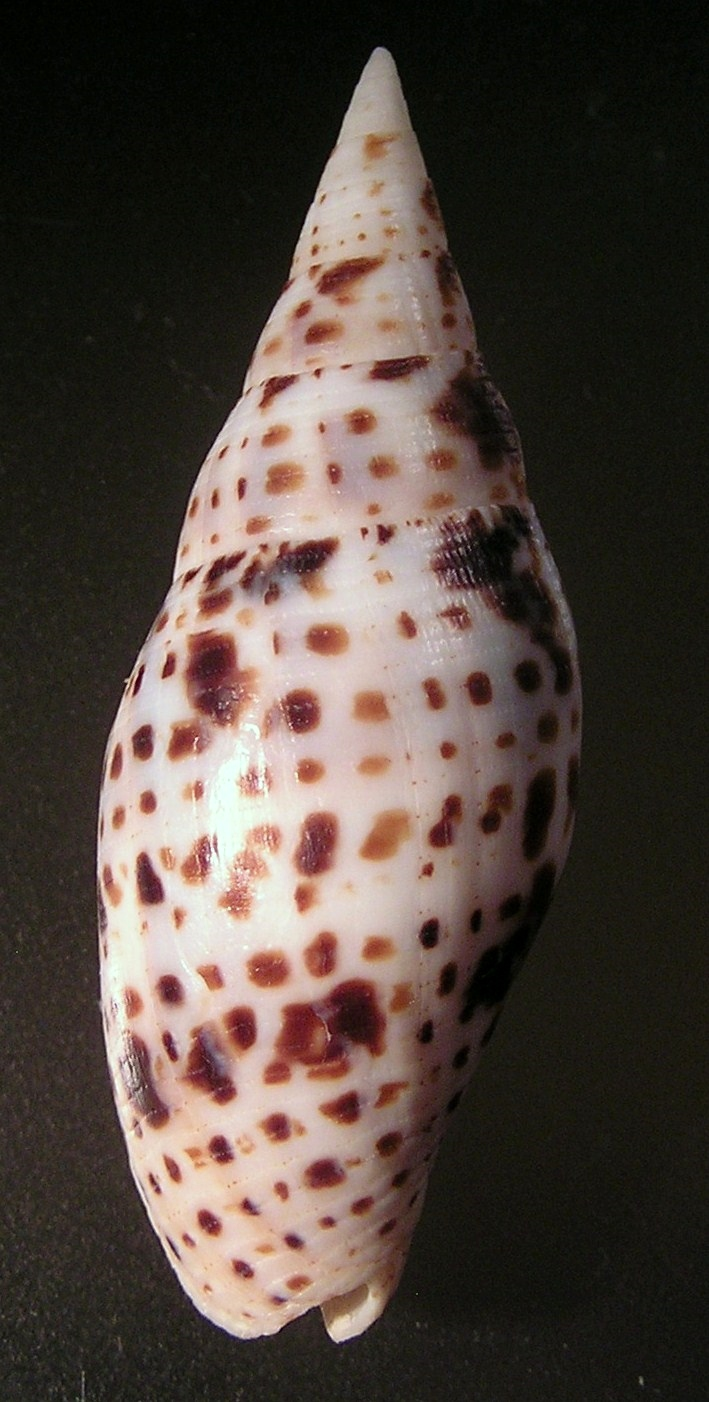

Scientific classification
- Kingdom: Animalia
- Phylum: Mollusca
- Class: Gastropoda
- Subclass: Caenogastropoda
- Order: Neogastropoda
- Family: Mitridae
- Genus: Quasimitra
- Species: Q. cardinalis

Binomial name
- Quasimitra cardinalis (Gmelin, 1791)

Synonyms
- Mitra cardinalis (Gmelin, 1791)

= Quasimitra cardinalis =

Species of gastropod

Quasimitra cardinalis is a species of sea snail, a marine gastropod mollusk in the family Mitridae, the miters or miter snails.

== Distribution ==
Can be found in Japan, the Mascarene Basin, Madagascar, and Mauritius.
