= Quasimitra lacunosa =

Scientific classification
- Kingdom: Animalia
- Phylum: Mollusca
- Class: Gastropoda
- Subclass: Caenogastropoda
- Order: Neogastropoda
- Family: Mitridae
- Genus: Quasimitra
- Species: Q. lacunosa

Binomial name
- Quasimitra lacunosa (Reeve, 1844)

Synonyms
- Quasimitra lacunosa (Reeve, 1844); Mitra lacunosa Reeve, 1844; Mitra mauritiana G. B. Sowerby II, 1874 ·

Species of gastropod

Quasimitra lacunosa is a species of sea snail, a marine gastropod mollusk in the family Mitridae, the miters or miter snails.

== Description ==
(Described as Mitra mauritiana) This shell resembles Reeve's Mitra lacunosa, but it is regularly cancellated by pitted grooves and ridges. The form is cylindrical, with shouldered, straight-sided whorls. The lip of the aperture is slightly crenulated.
