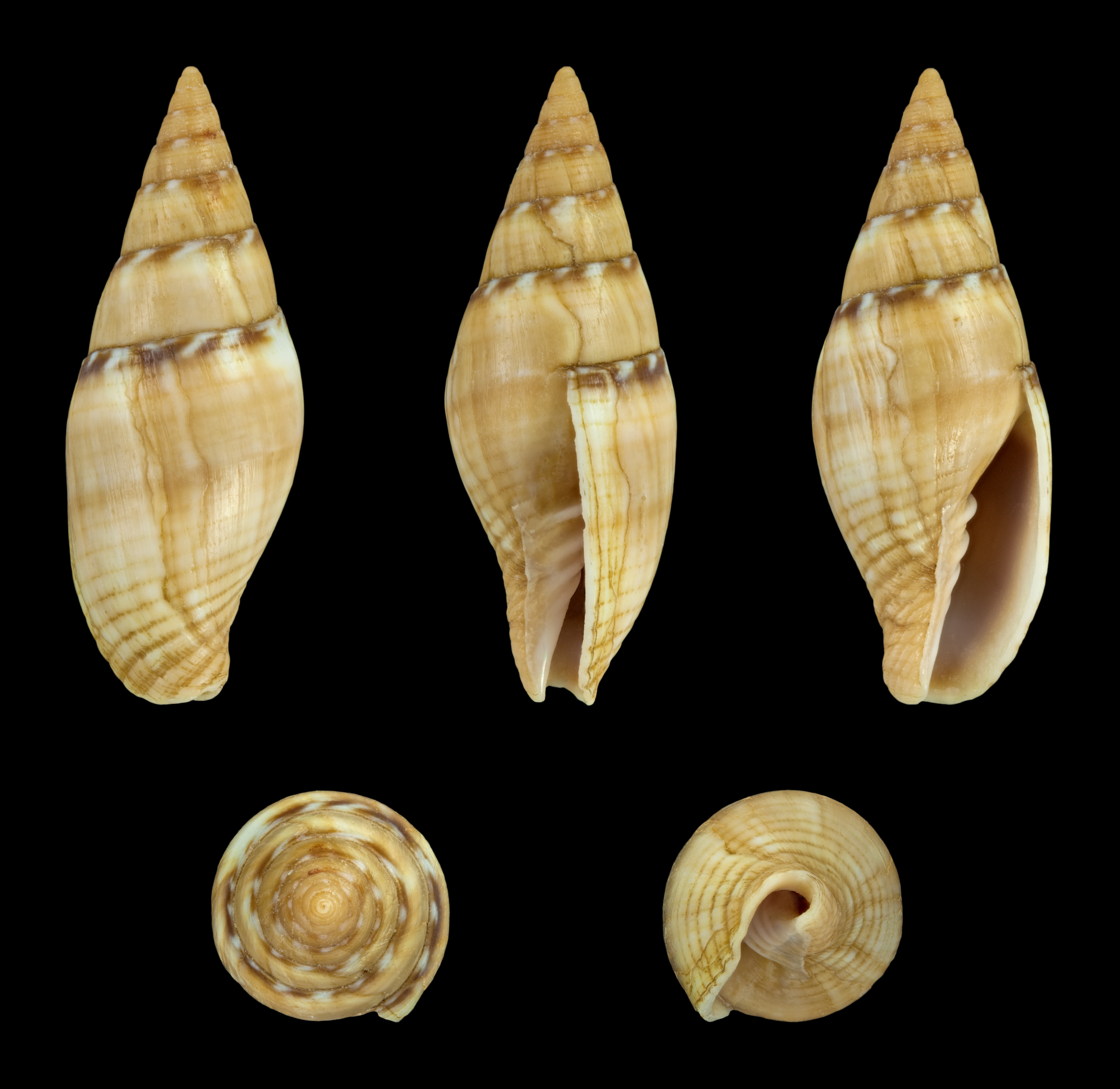

Scientific classification
- Kingdom: Animalia
- Phylum: Mollusca
- Class: Gastropoda
- Subclass: Caenogastropoda
- Order: Neogastropoda
- Family: Mitridae
- Genus: Quasimitra
- Species: Q. punctostriata

Binomial name
- Quasimitra punctostriata (A. Adams, 1855)

Synonyms
- Mitra punctostriata A. Adams, 1855

= Quasimitra punctostriata =

Species of gastropod

Quasimitra punctostriata is a species of sea snail, a marine gastropod mollusk in the family Mitridae, the miters or miter snails.
