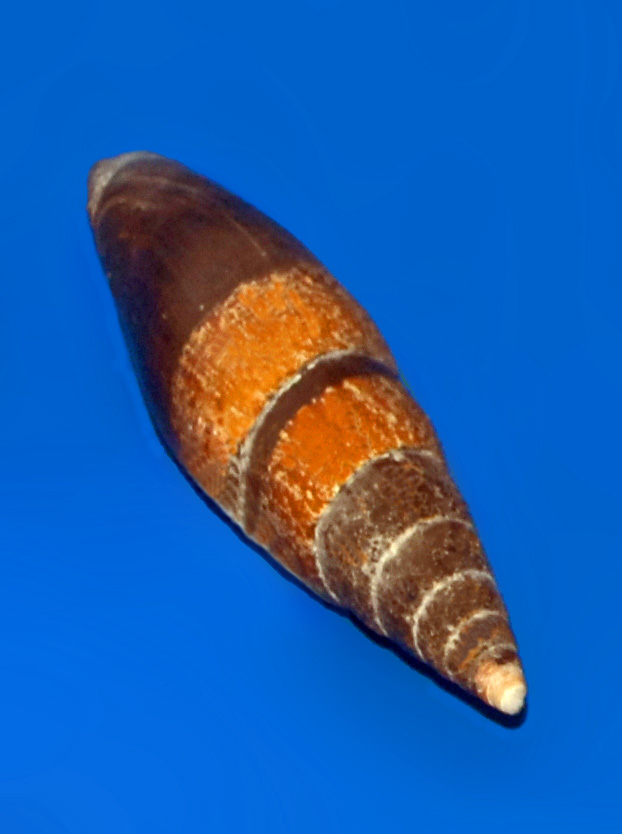
- Shell of Episcomitra zonata from Adriatic Sea at the Museo Civico di Storia Naturale di Milano

Scientific classification
- Kingdom: Animalia
- Phylum: Mollusca
- Class: Gastropoda
- Subclass: Caenogastropoda
- Order: Neogastropoda
- Family: Mitridae
- Genus: Episcomitra
- Species: E. zonata

Binomial name
- Episcomitra zonata (Marryat, 1818)

Synonyms
- Mitra (Mitra) fusiformis zonata Marryat, 1819; Mitra antiquata Kobelt, 1874; Mitra fusiformis zonata Marryat, 1819; Mitra santangeli Maravigna, 1840; Mitra zonata Marryat, 1818; Mitra zonata Risso, 1826; Mitra zonata var. concolor Coen, 1934; Mitra zonata var. major Pallary, 1900; Mitra zonata var. minor Pallary, 1900; Mitra zonata var. protracta Pallary, 1900

= Episcomitra zonata =

Zoned mitre

Species of gastropod

Episcomitra zonata, common name zoned mitre, is a species of sea snail, a marine gastropod mollusk in the family Mitridae, the miters or miter snails.

== Description ==
Episcomitra zonata has a shell reaching a length of 60–100 mm. The shape of the shell is elongated and slender. The surface is reddish brown with a dark brown spiral band. The interior is always white, with a long and narrow mouth.

== Distribution ==
This quite rare and endangered marine species is endemic to the Mediterranean Sea and to the Adriatic Sea; it has also been found off the Azores.

== Habitat ==
Episcomitra zonata can be found at depths of 20– 80 m.
