= Quasimitra sophiae =

Scientific classification
- Kingdom: Animalia
- Phylum: Mollusca
- Class: Gastropoda
- Subclass: Caenogastropoda
- Order: Neogastropoda
- Family: Mitridae
- Genus: Quasimitra
- Species: Q. sophiae

Binomial name
- Quasimitra sophiae (Crosse, 1862)

Synonyms
- Mitra sophiae Crosse, 1862

Species of gastropod

Quasimitra sophiae is a species of sea snail, a marine gastropod mollusk in the family Mitridae, the miters or miter snails.

== Description ==
- Size: This species typically reaches a size of about 30–35 mm in length.
- Shell: It features a small to medium-sized, solid, slender fusiform shell.
- Appearance: The shell has a distinctive appearance with a whitish to cream color base, often decorated with dark brown axial streaks on every whorl.
- Structure: It has a well-defined spire, a smooth surface with fine spiral grooves, and a narrow aperture.
- Habitat: Quasimitra sophiae has been found in sandy environments at depths of 20–30 meters.
- Location: The species is recorded in the southwest Pacific region, specifically around New Caledonia and the Isle of Pines.
- Synonyms: It was originally described under the name Mitra sophiae by Crosse in 1862.

== Distribution ==
New Caledonia, Pacific Ocean.
