= Quasimitra rubrolaterculus =

Scientific classification
- Kingdom: Animalia
- Phylum: Mollusca
- Class: Gastropoda
- Subclass: Caenogastropoda
- Order: Neogastropoda
- Family: Mitridae
- Genus: Quasimitra
- Species: Q. rubrolaterculus

Binomial name
- Quasimitra rubrolaterculus R. Aiken & Seccombe, 2019

Species of gastropod

Quasimitra rubrolaterculus is a species of sea snail, a marine gastropod mollusk in the family Mitridae, the miters or miter snails.

== Distribution ==
This marine species occurs off Natal, South Africa.
