= Quasimitra manuellae =

Scientific classification
- Kingdom: Animalia
- Phylum: Mollusca
- Class: Gastropoda
- Subclass: Caenogastropoda
- Order: Neogastropoda
- Family: Mitridae
- Genus: Quasimitra
- Species: Q. manuellae

Binomial name
- Quasimitra manuellae (Cossignani, 2006)

Synonyms
- Mitra manuellae Cossignani, 2006

Species of gastropod

Quasimitra manuellae is a species of sea snail, a marine gastropod mollusk in the family Mitridae, the miters or miter snails.
