= Quasimitra marmorea =

Scientific classification
- Kingdom: Animalia
- Phylum: Mollusca
- Class: Gastropoda
- Subclass: Caenogastropoda
- Order: Neogastropoda
- Family: Mitridae
- Genus: Quasimitra
- Species: Q. marmorea

Binomial name
- Quasimitra marmorea (Turner, 2007)

Synonyms
- Mitra marmorea Turner, 2007

Species of gastropod

Quasimitra marmorea is a species of sea snail, a marine gastropod mollusk in the family Mitridae, the miters or miter snails.
