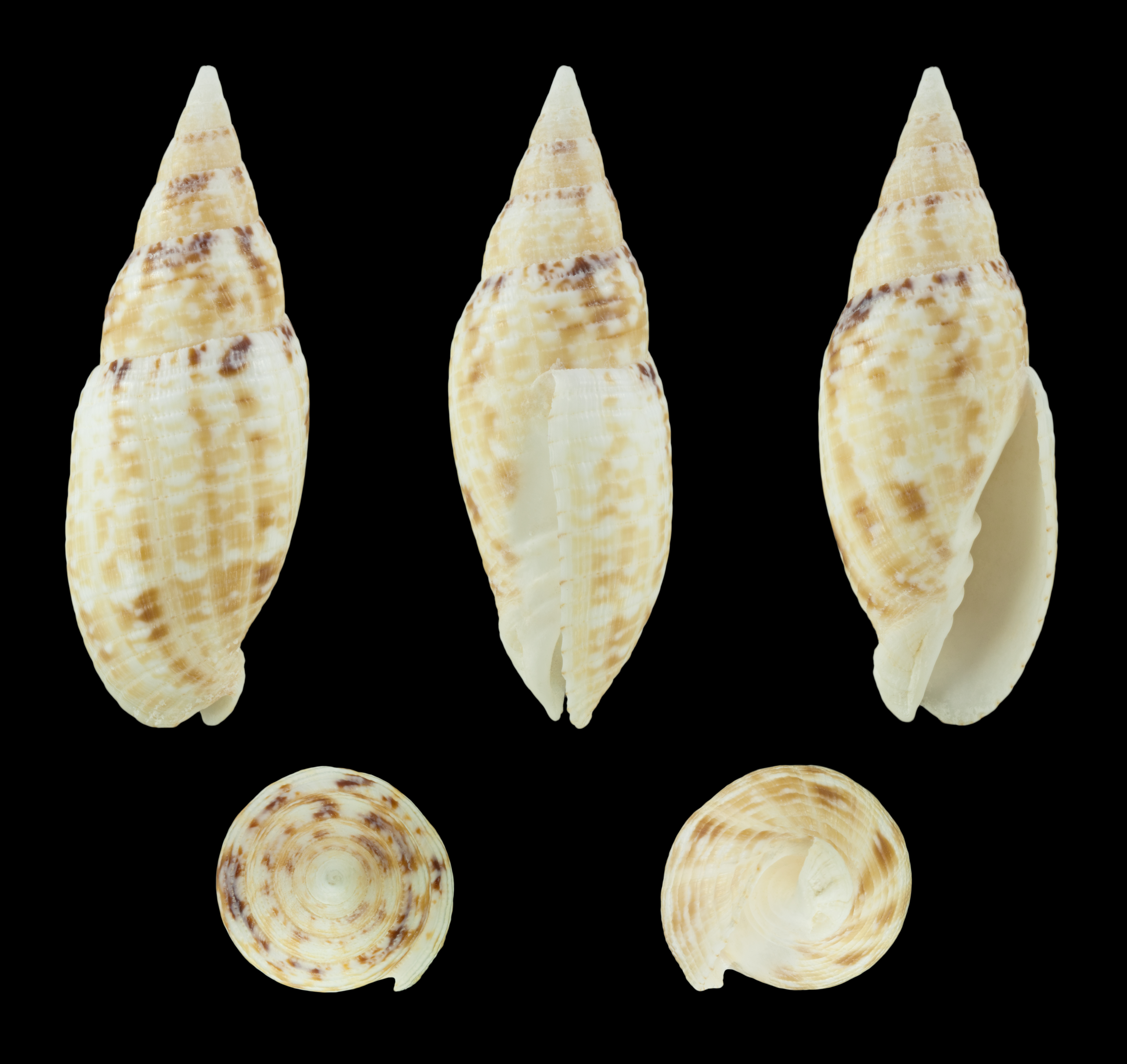

Scientific classification
- Kingdom: Animalia
- Phylum: Mollusca
- Class: Gastropoda
- Subclass: Caenogastropoda
- Order: Neogastropoda
- Family: Mitridae
- Genus: Quasimitra
- Species: Q. nubila

Binomial name
- Quasimitra nubila (Gmelin, 1791)

Synonyms
- Mitra (Mitra) nubila (Gmelin, 1791); Mitra erronea Dohrn, H., 1861; Mitra nubila (Gmelin, 1791); Mitra versicolor Martyn, 1784 (non-binominal); Voluta nubila Gmelin, 1791

= Quasimitra nubila =

Species of gastropod

Quasimitra nubila, common name the particolored mitre, is a species of sea snail, a marine gastropod mollusk in the family Mitridae, the miters or miter snails.

== Description ==
The size of the shell varies between 34 mm and 81 mm.

== Distribution ==
This species occurs in the Red Sea and in the Indian Ocean off Madagascar and in the Indo-West Pacific
