= Fusidomiporta suturata =

Scientific classification
- Kingdom: Animalia
- Phylum: Mollusca
- Class: Gastropoda
- Subclass: Caenogastropoda
- Order: Neogastropoda
- Family: Mitridae
- Genus: Fusidomiporta
- Species: F. suturata

Binomial name
- Fusidomiporta suturata (Reeve, 1845)

Synonyms
- Mitra suturata Reeve, 1845

Species of gastropod

Fusidomiporta suturata is a species of sea snail, a marine gastropod mollusk in the family Mitridae, the miters or miter snails.
