= Quasimitra solida =

Scientific classification
- Kingdom: Animalia
- Phylum: Mollusca
- Class: Gastropoda
- Subclass: Caenogastropoda
- Order: Neogastropoda
- Family: Mitridae
- Genus: Quasimitra
- Species: Q. solida

Binomial name
- Quasimitra solida (Reeve, 1844)

Synonyms
- Mitra solida Reeve, 1844

Species of gastropod

Quasimitra solida is a species of sea snail, a marine gastropod mollusk in the family Mitridae, the miters or miter snails.

Miters are most common in the Indo-Pacific region.

== Description ==
This species attains a size of 55 mm.

== Distribution ==
The species can be found at a depth of 80-100 meters. They are found off the shore of Queensland, Australia.
