= Charitodoronidae =

Scientific classification
- Kingdom: Animalia
- Phylum: Mollusca
- Class: Gastropoda
- Subclass: Caenogastropoda
- Order: Neogastropoda
- Superfamily: Mitroidea
- Family: Charitodoronidae; Fedosov, Herrmann, Kantor & Bouchet, 2018

Genera
- See text

Family of gastropods

Charitodoronidae, known as mitre shells, are a taxonomic family of sea snails, widely distributed marine gastropod molluscs in the clade Mitroidea.

== Genera ==
Genera in the family Charitodoronidae include:

- Charitodoron Tomlin, 1932
