= Mitrinae =

Scientific classification
- Kingdom: Animalia
- Phylum: Mollusca
- Class: Gastropoda
- Subclass: Caenogastropoda
- Order: Neogastropoda
- Superfamily: Mitroidea
- Family: Mitridae
- Subfamily: Mitrinae; Swainson, 1831

Subfamily of gastropods

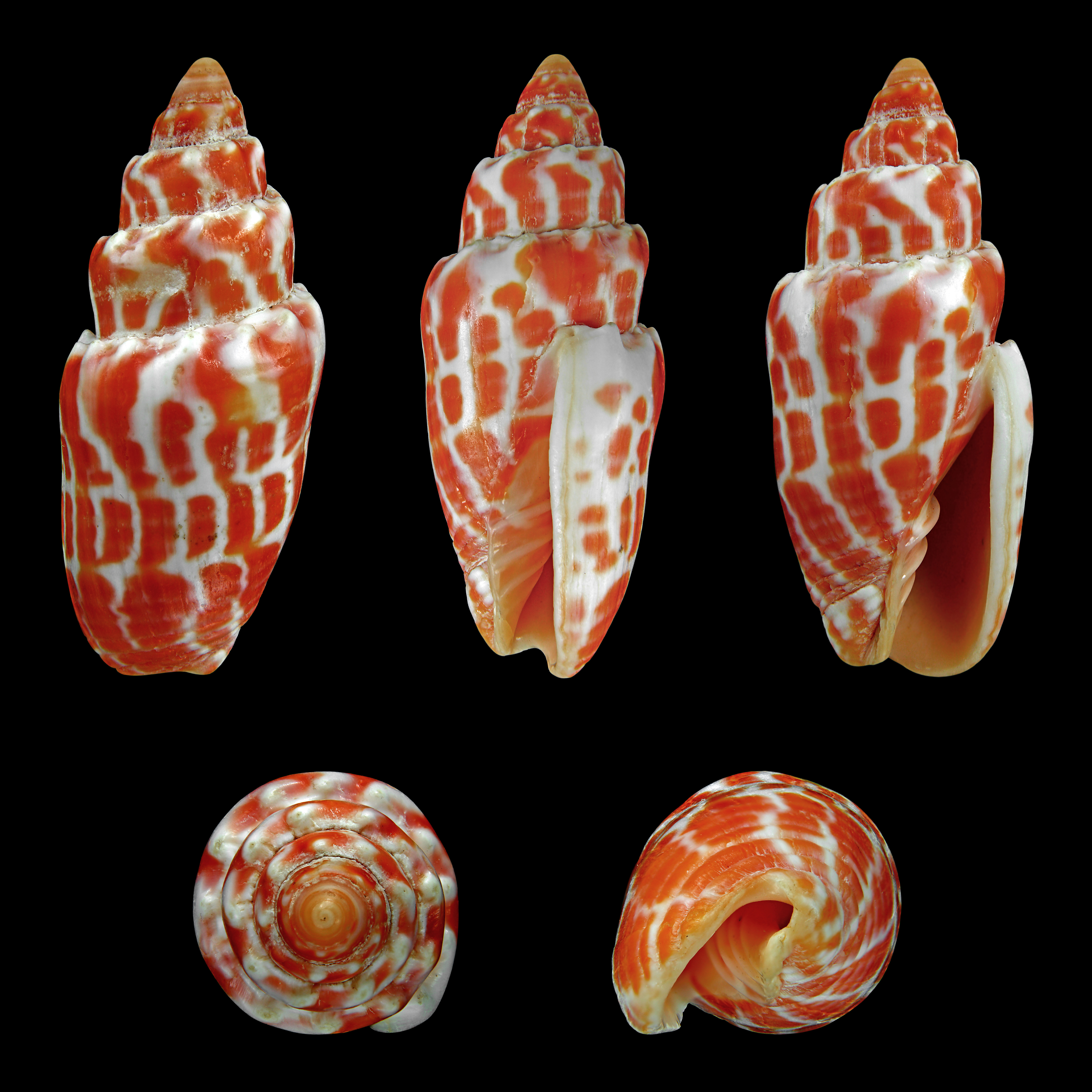
Mitra stictica, or pontifical mitre

Mitrinae, known as mitre shells, are a taxonomic subfamily of sea snails, widely distributed marine gastropod molluscs in the family Mitridae.

== Genera ==
- Acromargarita S.-I Huang, 2021
- Calcimitra Huang, 2011
- Cancillopsis Fedosov, Herrmann, Kantor & Bouchet, 2018
- † Dentimitra von Koenen, 1890 †
- Domiporta Cernohorsky, 1970
- Episcomitra Monterosato, 1917
- Eumitra Tate, 1889
- Fusidomiporta Fedosov, Herrmann, Kantor & Bouchet, 2018
- Gemmulimitra Fedosov, Herrmann, Kantor & Bouchet, 2018
- Mitra Röding, 1798
- Neotiara Fedosov, Herrmann, Kantor & Bouchet, 2018
- Profundimitra Fedosov, Herrmann, Kantor & Bouchet, 2018
- Pseudonebularia Fedosov, Herrmann, Kantor & Bouchet, 2018
- Quasimitra Fedosov, Herrmann, Kantor & Bouchet, 2018
- Roseomitra Fedosov, Herrmann, Kantor & Bouchet, 2018
- Ziba H. Adams & A. Adams, 1853
