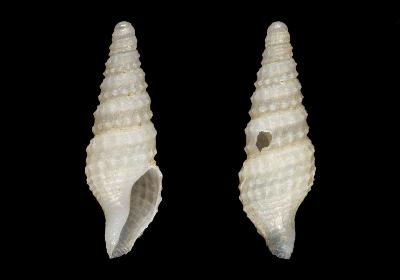
- Shell of Hortia paradrillia (holotype in the MNHN, Paris)

Scientific classification
- Kingdom: Animalia
- Phylum: Mollusca
- Class: Gastropoda
- Subclass: Caenogastropoda
- Order: Neogastropoda
- Superfamily: Mitroidea; Swainson, 1831

Families
- See text

= Mitroidea =

Superfamily of gastropods

Mitroidea is a superfamily of Recent and fossil sea snails, marine gastropod mollusks within the order Neogastropoda.

== Families ==
- Charitodoronidae Fedosov, Herrmann, Kantor & Bouchet, 2018
- Mitridae Swainson, 1831
- Pyramimitridae Cossmann, 1901

Family brought into synonymy

- Pleioptygmatidae Quinn, 1989 synonym of Pleioptygmatinae Quinn, 1989 represented as Mitridae Swainson, 1831
