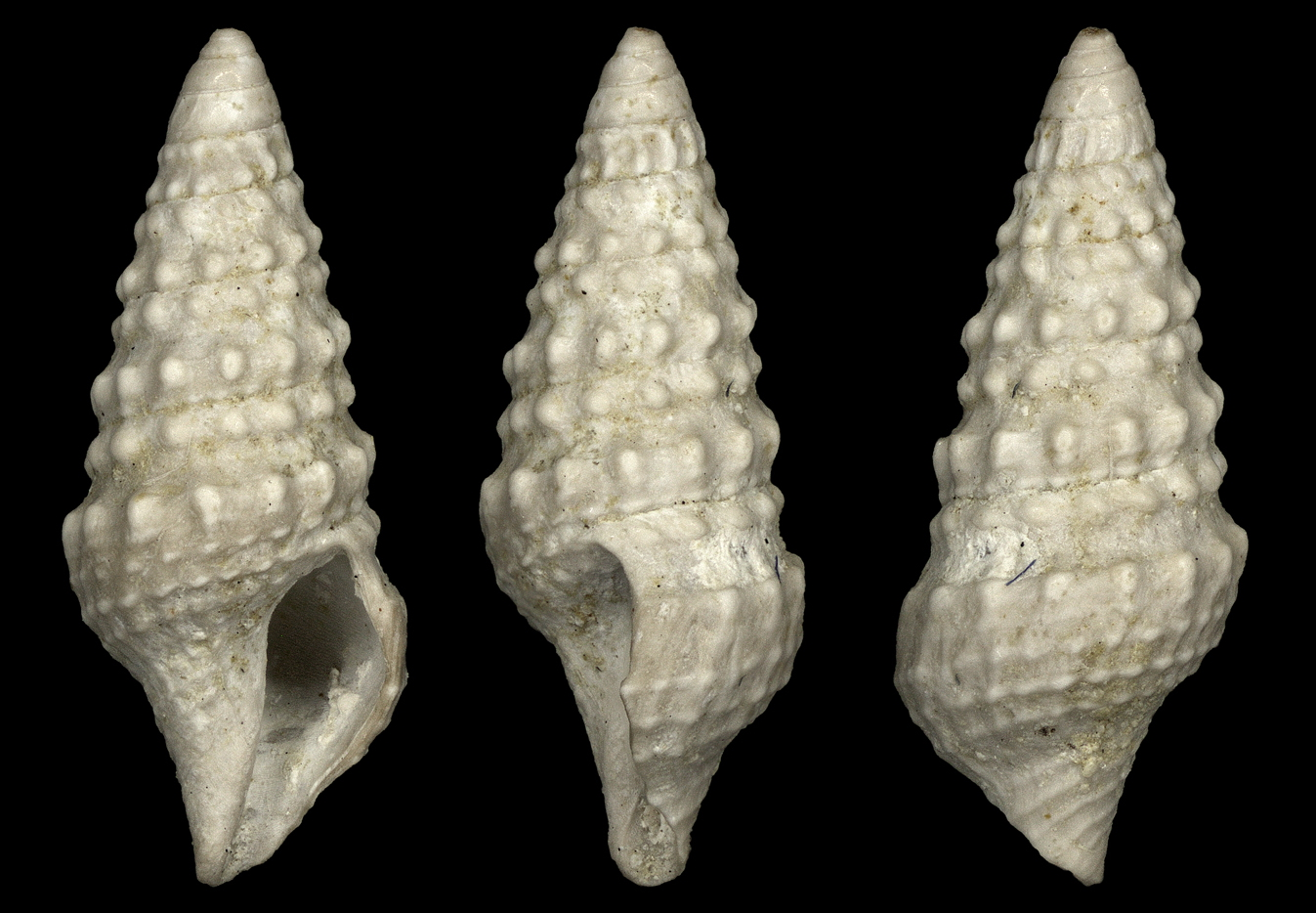
- Shells of † Crassispira lavillei (specimen in MNHN, Paris)

Scientific classification
- Kingdom: Animalia
- Phylum: Mollusca
- Class: Gastropoda
- Subclass: Caenogastropoda
- Order: Neogastropoda
- Superfamily: Conoidea
- Family: Pseudomelatomidae
- Genus: Crassispira
- Species: C. lavillei

Binomial name
- Crassispira lavillei (de Boury, 1899)

Synonyms
- Crassispira (Tripia) lavillei (de Boury, 1899); † Drillia (Tripia) lavillei (de Boury, 1899)

= Crassispira lavillei =

Extinct species of gastropod

Crassispira lavillei is an extinct species of sea snail, a marine gastropod mollusk in the family Pseudomelatomidae, the turrids and allies. Fossils have been found in Eocene strata in the Paris Basin, France.
