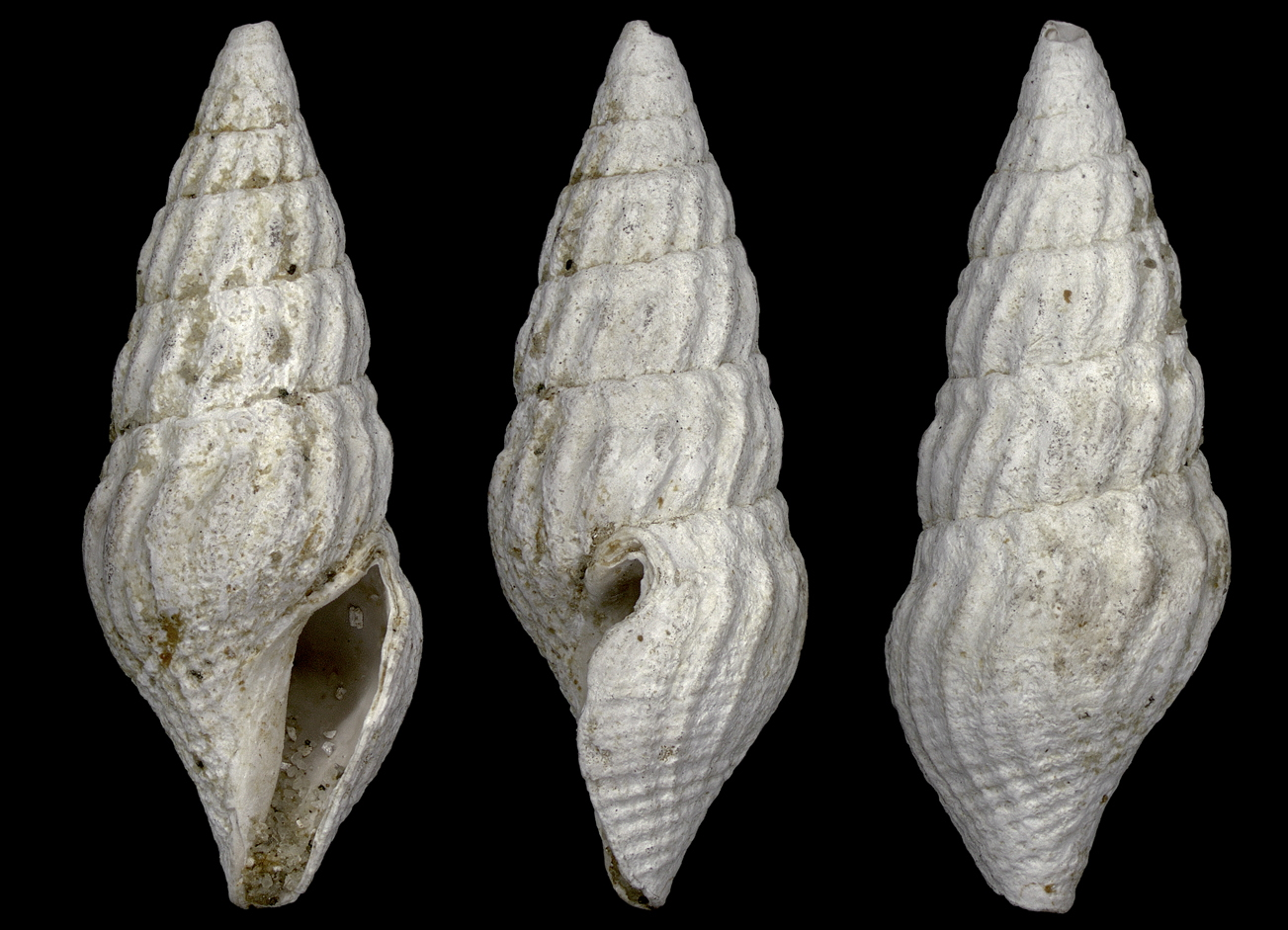
- Shells of † Crassispira lepta (specimen at MNHN, Paris)

Scientific classification
- Kingdom: Animalia
- Phylum: Mollusca
- Class: Gastropoda
- Subclass: Caenogastropoda
- Order: Neogastropoda
- Superfamily: Conoidea
- Family: Pseudomelatomidae
- Genus: Crassispira
- Species: C. lepta

Binomial name
- Crassispira lepta (Edwards, 1861)

Synonyms
- † Pleurotoma (Oxyacrum) lepta Edwards, 1861; † Drillia (Crassispira) lepta (Edwards, 1861)

= Crassispira lepta =

Extinct species of gastropod

Crassispira lepta is an extinct species of sea snail, a marine gastropod mollusk in the family Pseudomelatomidae, the turrids and allies. Fossils have been found in Eocene strata in the Paris Basin, France.

Subspecies: Crassispira lepta leptoides (de Boury, 1899) (synonym: Drillia (Crassispira) leptoides (de Boury, 1899)
