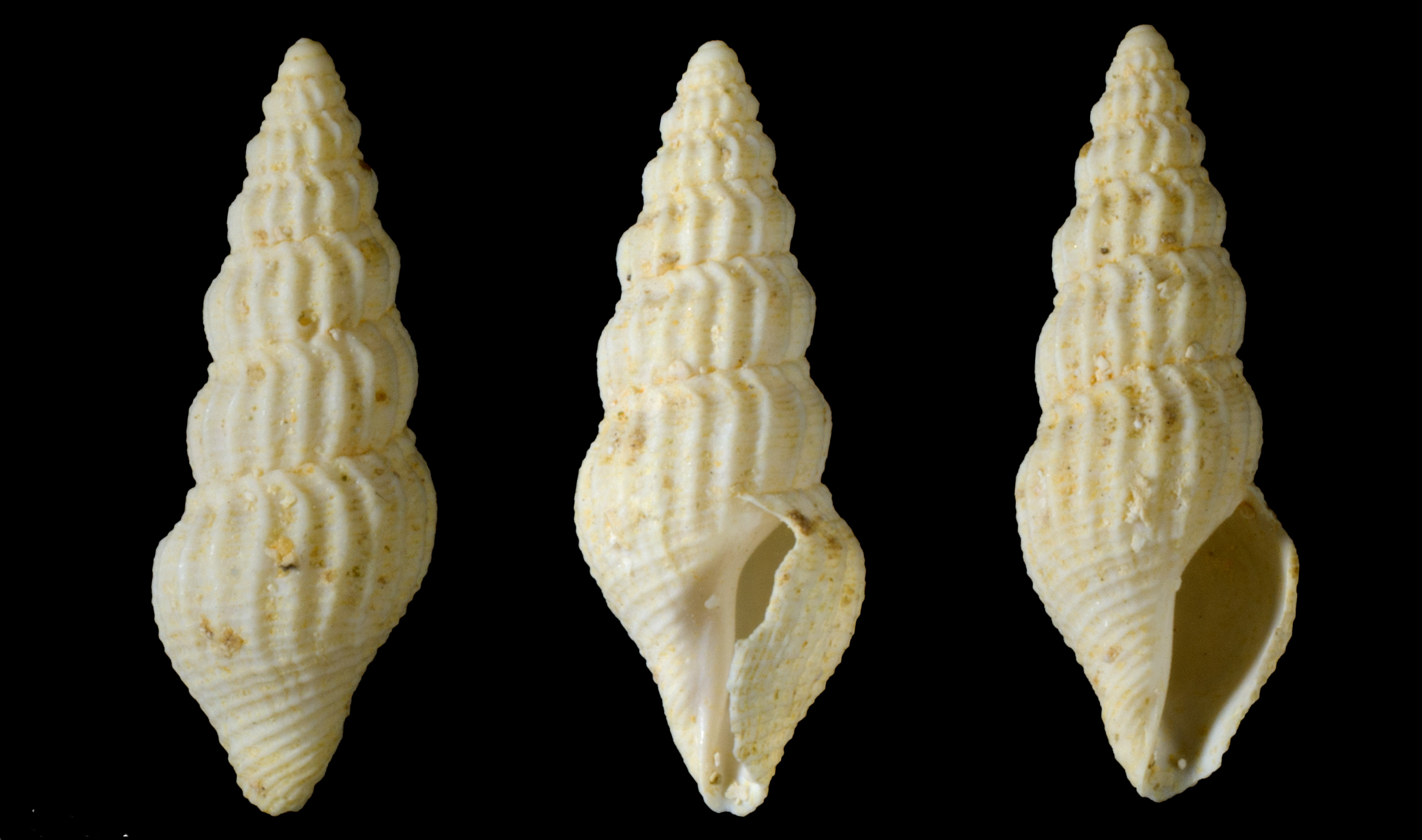
- Shells of † Crassispira sulcata (specimen in MNHN, Paris)

Scientific classification
- Kingdom: Animalia
- Phylum: Mollusca
- Class: Gastropoda
- Subclass: Caenogastropoda
- Order: Neogastropoda
- Superfamily: Conoidea
- Family: Pseudomelatomidae
- Genus: Crassispira
- Species: C. sulcata

Binomial name
- Crassispira sulcata (Lamarck, 1804)

Synonyms
- † Drillia (Tripia) sulcata (Lamarck, 1804)

= Crassispira sulcata =

Extinct species of gastropod

Crassispira sulcata is an extinct species of sea snail, a marine gastropod mollusk in the family Pseudomelatomidae, the turrids and allies. Fossils have been found in Eocene strata in the Paris Basin, France.

Subspecies

- † Crassispira (Tripia) sulcata adriani (Dollfus, 1899) (synonyms:Pleurotoma dollfusi de Boury non Vincent, 1878, Pleurotoma adriani Dollfus, 1899; Drillia (Tripia) adriani (Dollfus, 1899), Crassispira (Tripia) quoniamensis (Boussac in Périer, 1995)
- † Crassispira (Tripia) sulcata costaria (G.P. Deshayes, 1834) (synonyms: Drillia (Crassispira) costaria (Lamarck, 1804); Drillia (Tripia) costaria (Lamarck, 1804))
