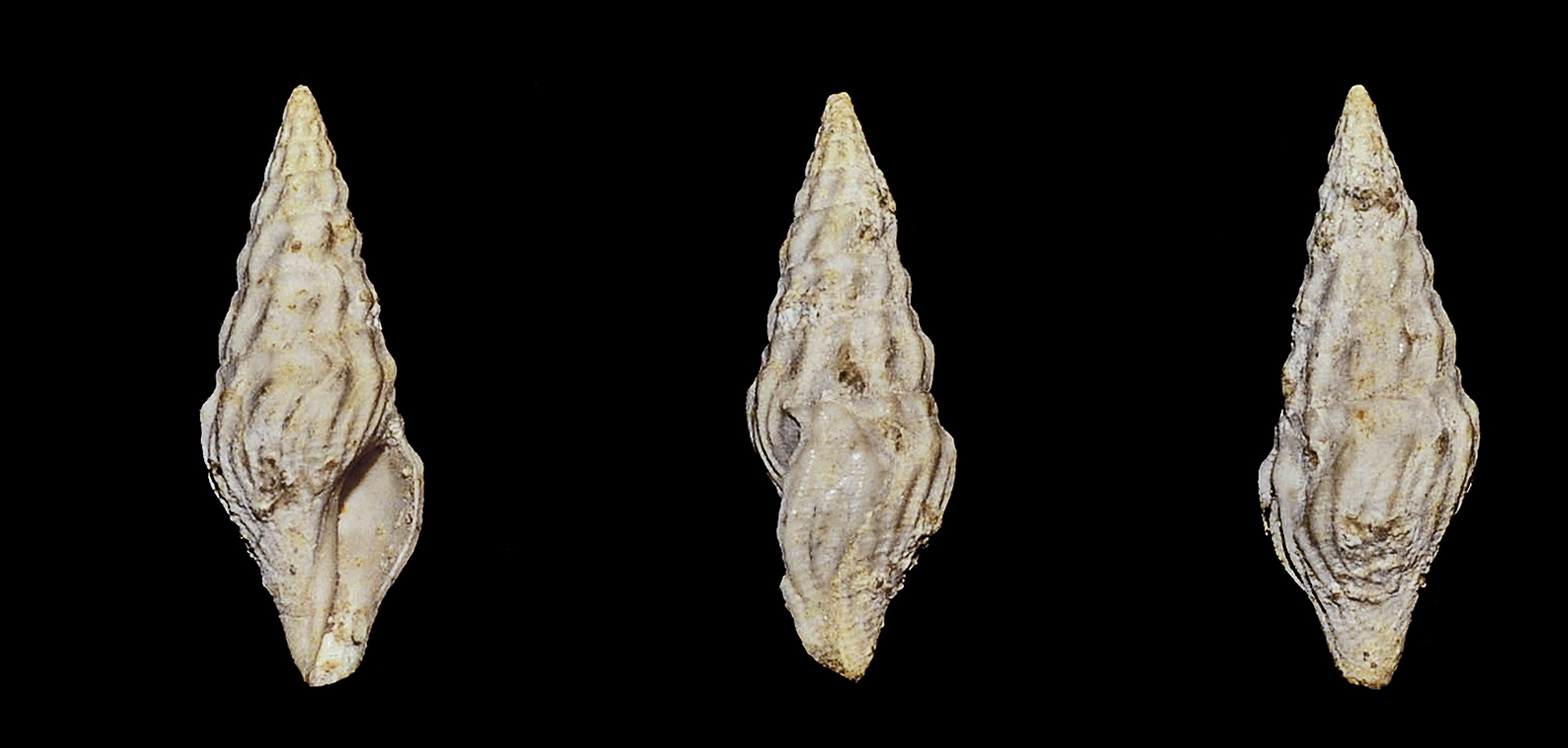
- Shells of †Crassispira furcata (specimen in MNHN, Paris)

Scientific classification
- Kingdom: Animalia
- Phylum: Mollusca
- Class: Gastropoda
- Subclass: Caenogastropoda
- Order: Neogastropoda
- Superfamily: Conoidea
- Family: Pseudomelatomidae
- Genus: Crassispira
- Species: C. furcata

Binomial name
- Crassispira furcata (Lamarck, 1804)

Synonyms
- † Drillia (Crassispira) furcata (Lamarck, 1804); † Drillia furcata (Lamarck, 1804)

= Crassispira furcata =

Extinct species of gastropod

Crassispira furcata is an extinct species of sea snail, a marine gastropod mollusk in the family Pseudomelatomidae, the turrids and allies. Fossils have been found in Eocene strata in the Paris Basin, France.

Subspecies: Crassispira furcata septeuilensis (de Boury, 1899) (synonym: Drillia furcata septeuilensis (de Boury, 1899))
