= Crassispira semicolon =

Scientific classification
- Kingdom: Animalia
- Phylum: Mollusca
- Class: Gastropoda
- Subclass: Caenogastropoda
- Order: Neogastropoda
- Superfamily: Conoidea
- Family: Pseudomelatomidae
- Genus: Crassispira
- Species: C. semicolon

Binomial name
- Crassispira semicolon (Sowerby I, 1816)

Synonyms
- † Crassispira (Crassispira) semicolon (Sowerby I, 1816); † Drillia (Crassispira) inflexa (Lamarck, 1850); † Pleurotoma inflexa Lamarck, 1850; † Pleurotoma semicolon Sowerby I, 1816

Extinct species of gastropod

Crassispira semicolon is an extinct species of carnivorous sea snail, a marine gastropod mollusk in the family Pseudomelatomidae, the turrids and allies.

Subspecies: † Crassispira semicolon chameryensis (de Boury, 1899) (synonym: † Pleurotoma chameryensis de Boury, 1899)

== Description ==
The length of the shell attains 24.6 mm; its diameter is 8.3 mm. It lived from roughly the Eocene period 47.8 - 41.3 million years ago, before having a last known appearance 3.60 - 2.59 million years ago, during the Cenozoic period.

== Distribution ==
Fossils have been found in Pliocene and Middle Eocene strata off Norfolk, Great Britain; also in the Paris Basin, and the Loire Basin; France.
