= Crassispira subgranulosa =

Scientific classification
- Kingdom: Animalia
- Phylum: Mollusca
- Class: Gastropoda
- Subclass: Caenogastropoda
- Order: Neogastropoda
- Superfamily: Conoidea
- Family: Pseudomelatomidae
- Genus: Crassispira
- Species: C. subgranulosa

Binomial name
- Crassispira subgranulosa (d'Orbigny, 1850)

Synonyms
- † Drillia (Tripia) subgranulosa (d'Orbigny, 1850); † Pleurotoma subgranulosa Orbigny, A.V.M.D. d', 1850

Extinct species of gastropod

Crassispira subgranulosa is an extinct species of sea snail, a marine gastropod mollusc in the family Pseudomelatomidae, the turrids and allies. Fossils of this extinct marine species were found in Eocene strata of the Paris Basin, France.
