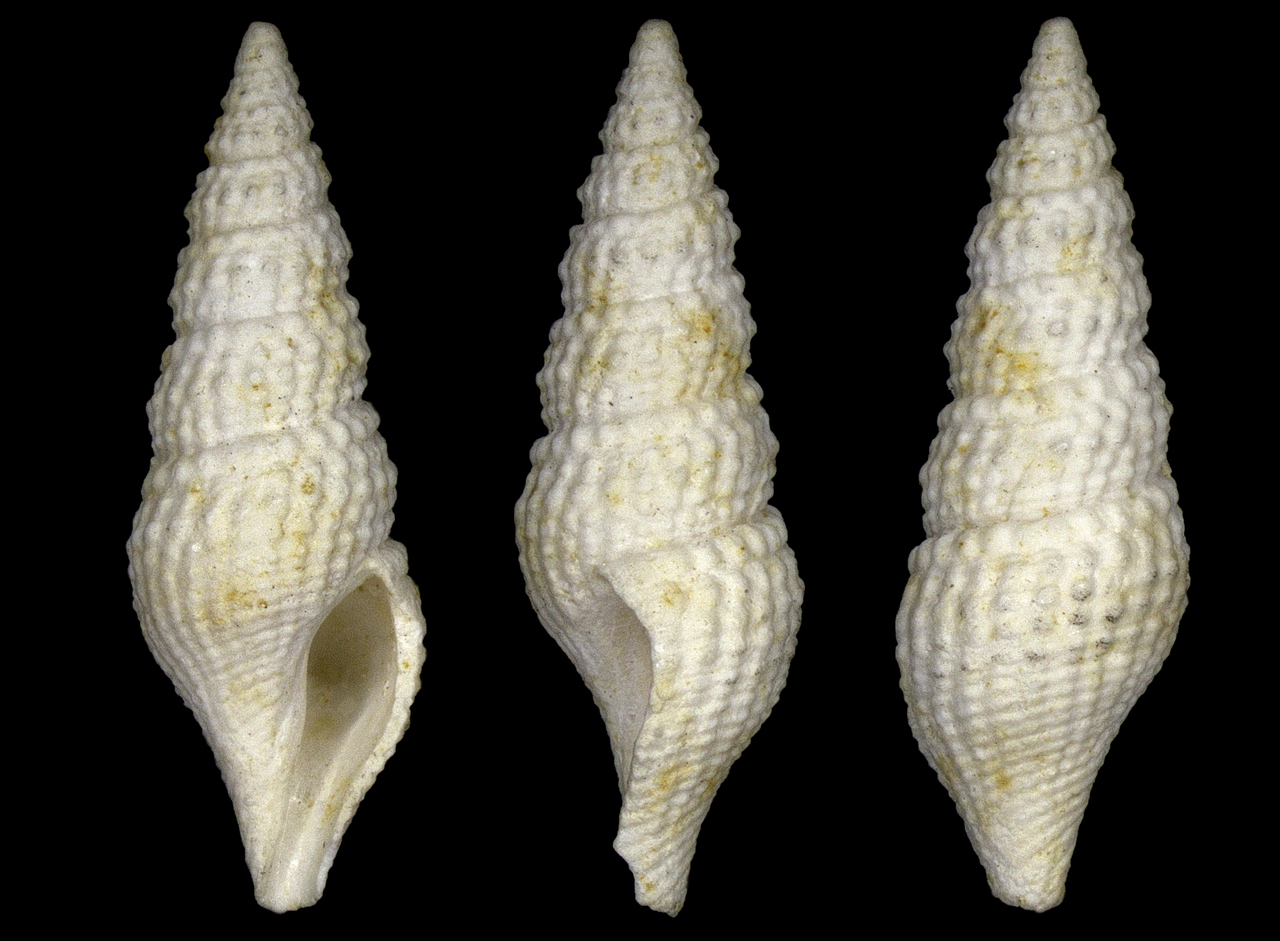
- Shells of † Crassispira granulata (specimens at MNHN, Paris)

Scientific classification
- Kingdom: Animalia
- Phylum: Mollusca
- Class: Gastropoda
- Subclass: Caenogastropoda
- Order: Neogastropoda
- Superfamily: Conoidea
- Family: Pseudomelatomidae
- Genus: Crassispira
- Species: C. granulata

Binomial name
- Crassispira granulata (Lamarck, 1804)

Synonyms
- † Crassispira (Tripia) granulata (Lamarck, 1804); † Drillia (Tripia) granulata (Lamarck, 1804)

= Crassispira granulata =

Extinct species of gastropod

Crassispira margaritula is an extinct species of sea snail, a marine gastropod mollusc in the family Pseudomelatomidae, the turrids and allies.

Subspecies

- † Crassispira (Tripia) granulata guetaini (de Boury, 1899)
- † Crassispira (Tripia) granulata herouvalensis (de Boury, 1899)

== Distribution ==
Fossils of this extinct marine species were found in Eocene strata of the Paris Basin, France.
