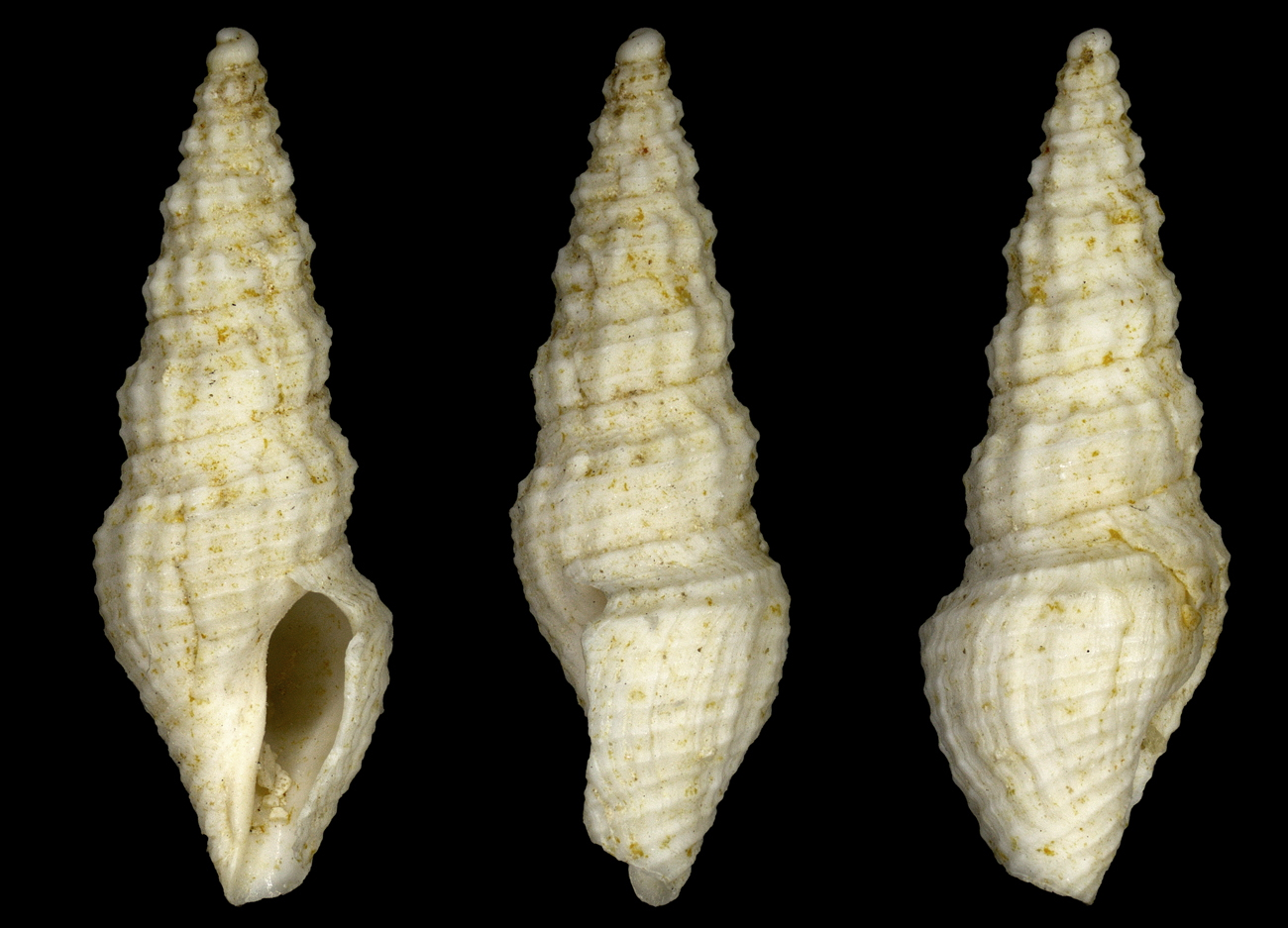
- Shells of †Crassispira nana (specimen in MNHN, Paris)

Scientific classification
- Kingdom: Animalia
- Phylum: Mollusca
- Class: Gastropoda
- Subclass: Caenogastropoda
- Order: Neogastropoda
- Superfamily: Conoidea
- Family: Pseudomelatomidae
- Genus: Crassispira
- Species: C. nana

Binomial name
- Crassispira nana (G.P. Deshayes, 1834 )

Synonyms
- † Crassispira (Tripia) nana (Deshayes, 1834); † Crassispira (Tripia) margaritula mesomorpha Cossmann,.1889; † Drillia (Tripla) mesomorpha Cossmann, 1889

= Crassispira nana =

Extinct species of gastropod

Crassispira nana is an extinct species of sea snail, a marine gastropod mollusk in the family Pseudomelatomidae, the turrids and allies.

Subspecies: †Crassispira nana clarae (A.E.M. Cossmann & G. Pissarro, 1913) (Eocene strata in the Paris Basin) (synonym: Crassispira (Tripia) clarae (Cossmann & Pissarro, 1913) )

== Distribution ==
Fossils have been found in Eocene strata in the Paris Basin, France.
