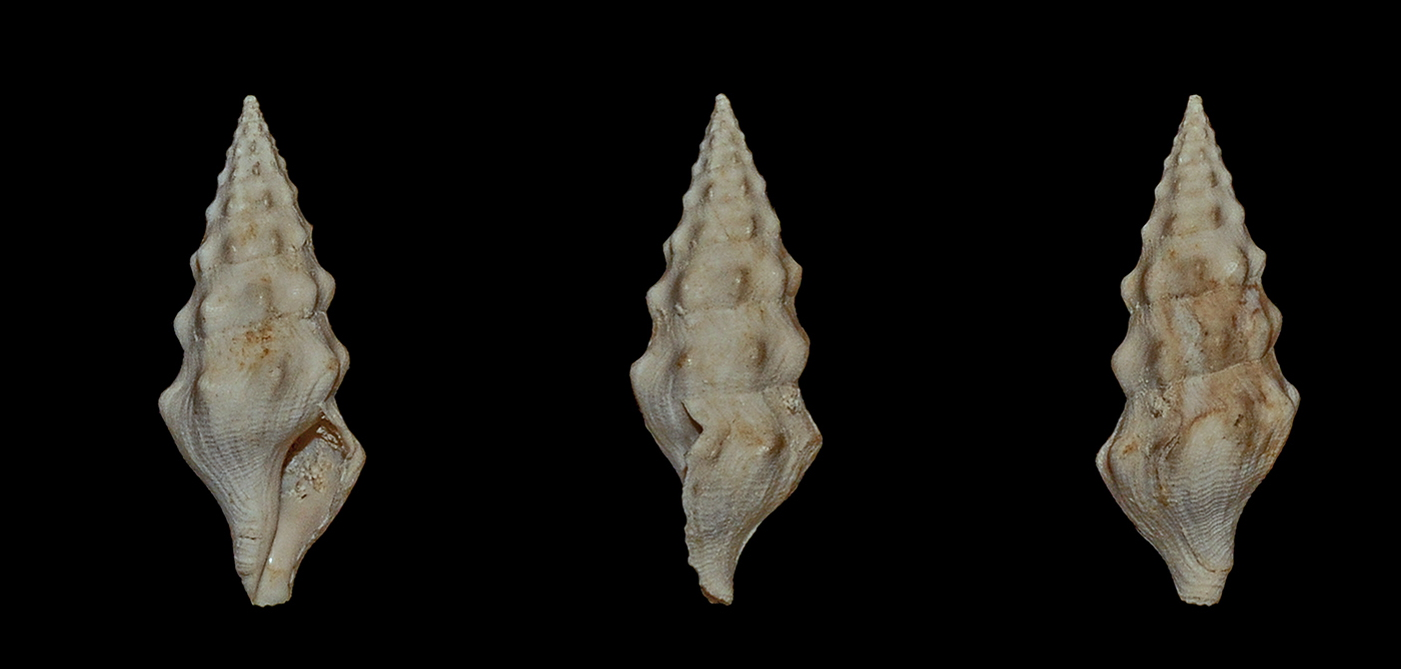
- Shells of †Crassispira nodulosa (specimen in MNHN, Paris)

Scientific classification
- Kingdom: Animalia
- Phylum: Mollusca
- Class: Gastropoda
- Subclass: Caenogastropoda
- Order: Neogastropoda
- Superfamily: Conoidea
- Family: Pseudomelatomidae
- Genus: Crassispira
- Species: C. nodulosa

Binomial name
- Crassispira nodulosa (Lamarck, 1804)

Synonyms
- † Drillia nodulosa (Lamarck, 1804)

= Crassispira nodulosa =

Extinct species of gastropod

Crassispira nodulosa is an extinct species of sea snail, a marine gastropod mollusk in the family Pseudomelatomidae, the turrids and allies.

== Distribution ==
Fossils have been found in Eocene strata in the Paris Basin, France.
