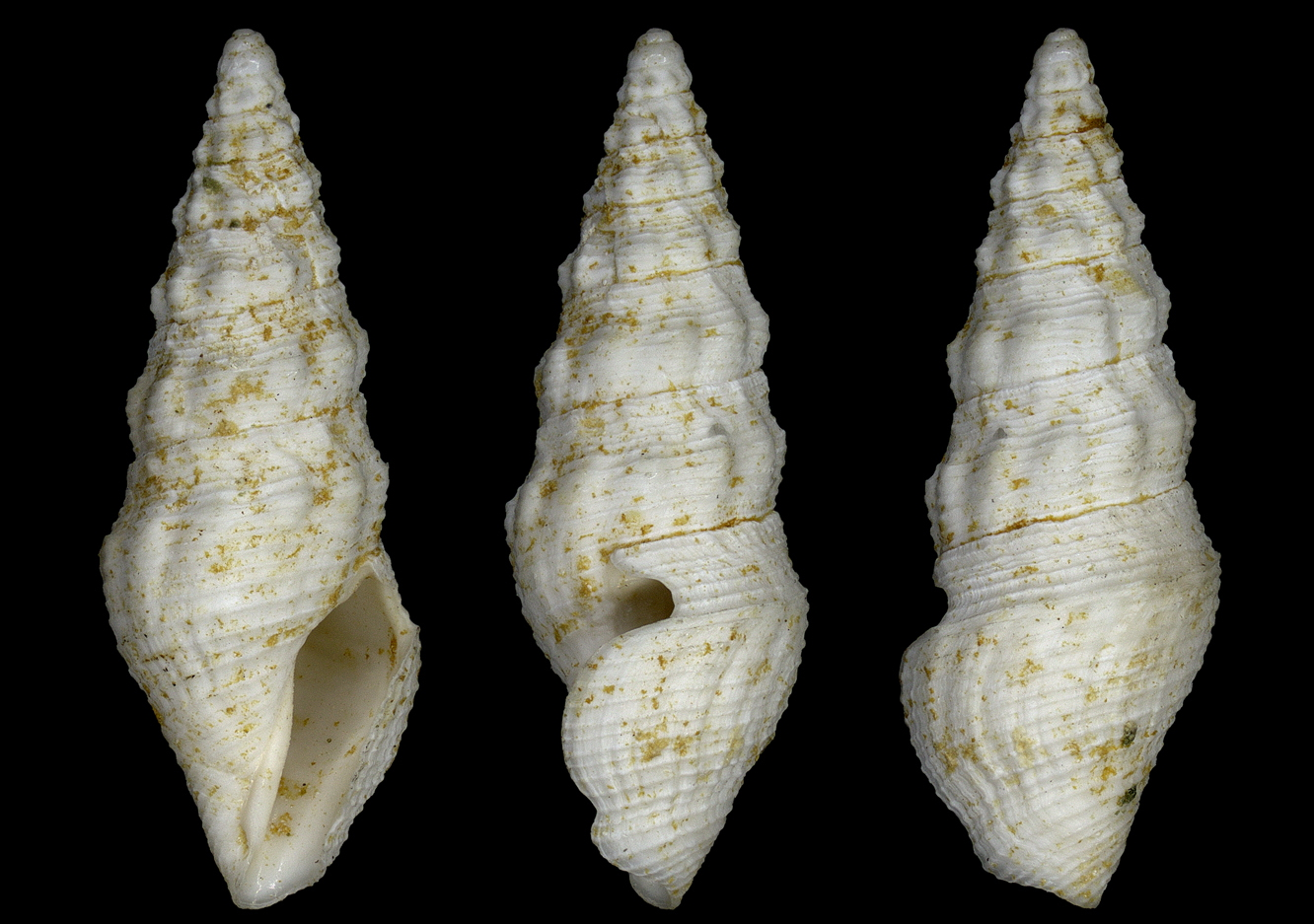
- Shells of Crassispira margaritula (specimens at MNHN, Paris)

Scientific classification
- Kingdom: Animalia
- Phylum: Mollusca
- Class: Gastropoda
- Subclass: Caenogastropoda
- Order: Neogastropoda
- Superfamily: Conoidea
- Family: Pseudomelatomidae
- Genus: Crassispira
- Species: C. margaritula

Binomial name
- Crassispira margaritula (Deshayes, 1834)

Synonyms
- † Drillia (Tripia) margaritula (Desheyes, 1834)

= Crassispira margaritula =

Extinct species of gastropod

Crassispira margaritula is an extinct species of sea snail, a marine gastropod mollusc in the family Pseudomelatomidae, the turrids and allies. Fossils of this extinct marine species were found in Eocene strata of the Paris Basin, France.
