= Alvania spirialis =

Scientific classification
- Kingdom: Animalia
- Phylum: Mollusca
- Class: Gastropoda
- Subclass: Caenogastropoda
- Order: Littorinimorpha
- Superfamily: Rissooidea
- Family: Rissoidae
- Genus: Alvania
- Species: †A. spirialis

Binomial name
- †Alvania spirialis Glibert, 1949

Synonyms
- † Alvania (Arsenia) spirialis Glibert, 1949 (Arsenia regarded as a junior synonym of Alvania)

Species of gastropod

Alvania spirialis is an extinct species of minute sea snail, a marine gastropod mollusc or micromollusk in the family Rissoidae.

== Distribution ==
Fossils of this species were in Langhian strata (Middle Miocene) in the Paris Basin, France.
