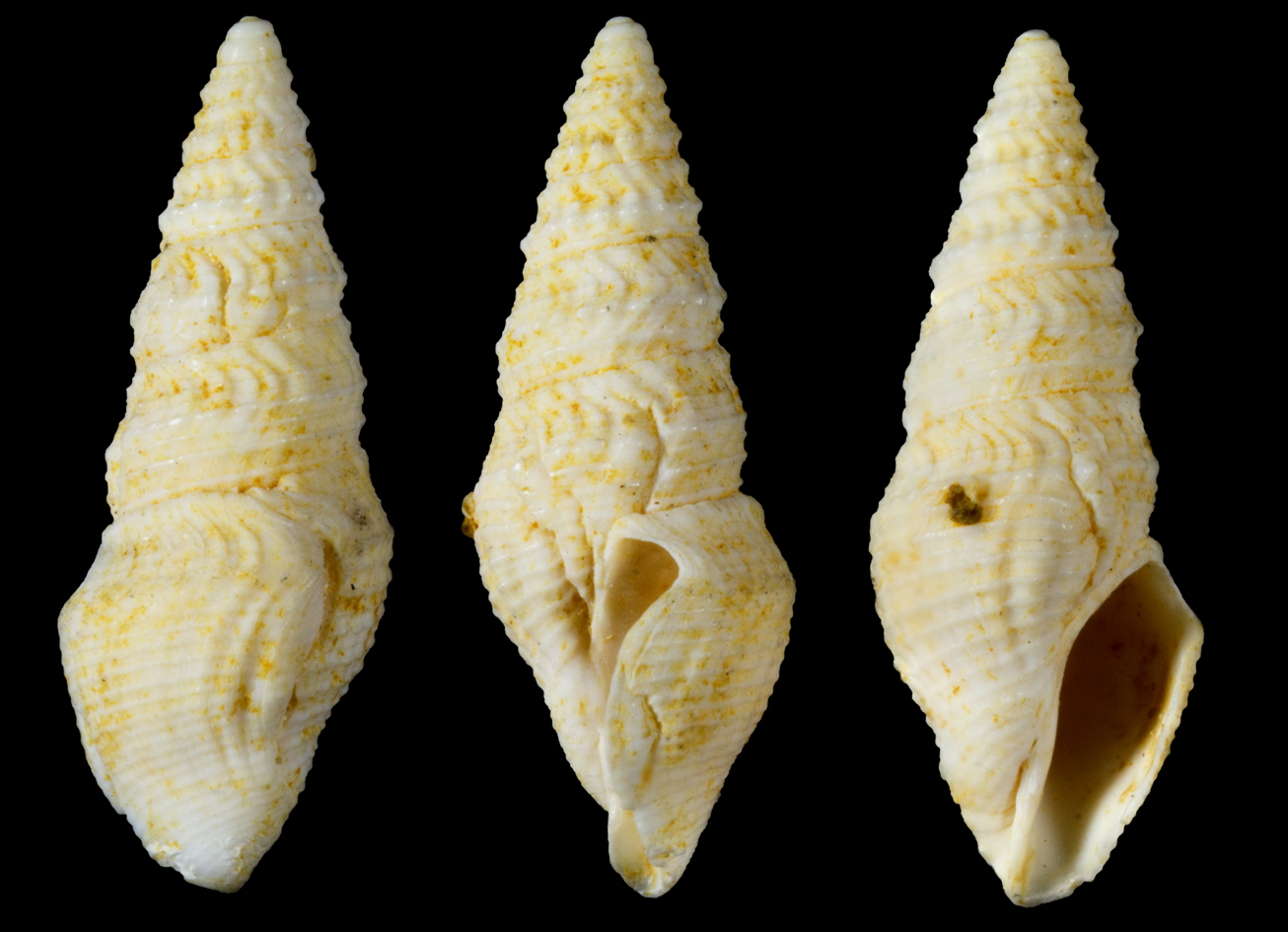
- Shells of †Crassispira angulosa (specimen in MNHN, Paris)

Scientific classification
- Kingdom: Animalia
- Phylum: Mollusca
- Class: Gastropoda
- Subclass: Caenogastropoda
- Order: Neogastropoda
- Superfamily: Conoidea
- Family: Pseudomelatomidae
- Genus: Crassispira
- Species: C. angulosa

Binomial name
- Crassispira angulosa (G.P. Deshayes, 1834 )

Synonyms
- † Drillia (Tripia) angulosa G.P. Deshayes, 1834

= Crassispira angulosa =

Extinct species of gastropod

Crassispira angulosa is an extinct species of sea snail, a marine gastropod mollusk in the family Pseudomelatomidae, the turrids and allies.

Subspecies: † Crassispira angulosa acyensis (A.E.M. Cossmann, 1889) (synonym: Drillia (Crassispira) angulosa acyensis Cossmann, 1889)

== Description ==
The length of the shell attains 6.8 mm.

== Distribution ==
Fossils have been found in Eocene strata in the Paris Basin, France.
