= Alvania zosta =

Scientific classification
- Kingdom: Animalia
- Phylum: Mollusca
- Class: Gastropoda
- Subclass: Caenogastropoda
- Order: Littorinimorpha
- Superfamily: Rissooidea
- Family: Rissoidae
- Genus: Alvania
- Species: †A. zosta

Binomial name
- †Alvania zosta (Bayan, 1873)

Synonyms
- † Alvania (Alvinia) zosta (Bayan, 1873); † Alvinia zosta (Bayan, 1873) superseded combination; † Rissoa zosta Bayan, 1873

Extinct species of gastropod

Alvania zosta is an extinct species of minute sea snail, a marine gastropod mollusc or micromollusk in the family Rissoidae.

== Distribution ==
Fossils of this species were in Eocene strata in Paris Basin, France
