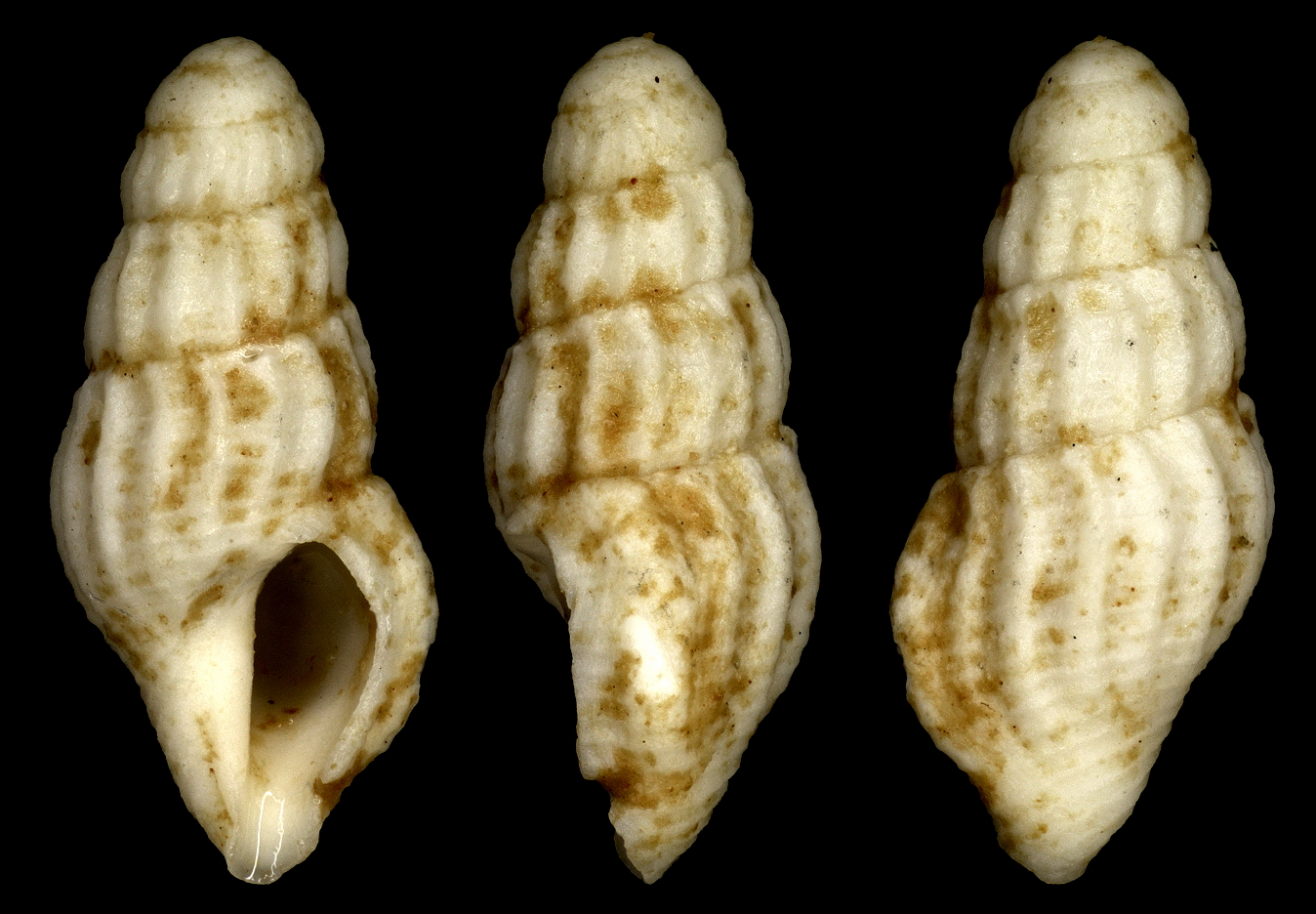
- Shells of † Crassispira quoniamensis

Scientific classification
- Kingdom: Animalia
- Phylum: Mollusca
- Class: Gastropoda
- Subclass: Caenogastropoda
- Order: Neogastropoda
- Superfamily: Conoidea
- Family: Pseudomelatomidae
- Genus: Crassispira
- Species: C. quoniamensis

Binomial name
- Crassispira quoniamensis (Boussac in Périer, 1941)

Synonyms
- † Crassispira (Tripla) quoniomensis (Dolfuss, 1899); † Crassispira (Tripia) sulcata adriani (Dollfus, 1899); † Drillia quoniamensis Boussac in Périer, 1941

= Crassispira quoniamensis =

Extinct species of gastropod

Crassispira quoniamensis is an extinct species of sea snail, a marine gastropod mollusk in the family Pseudomelatomidae, the turrids and allies.

This species, as † Drillia quoniamensis Boussac in Périer, 1941, has also been considered a synonym of Crassispira (Tripia) sulcata adriani (Dollfus, 1899)

== Distribution ==
Fossils have been found in Eocene strata in the Paris Basin, France.
