= Type Ien supernova =

Type of supernova event

A Type Ien supernova is a proposed class of interacting supernova whose spectra are dominated by narrow lines of silicon, sulfur and argon, with no hydrogen and weak helium. The class is based on a single event, SN 2021yfj, discovered in 2021 and described in Nature in 2025.

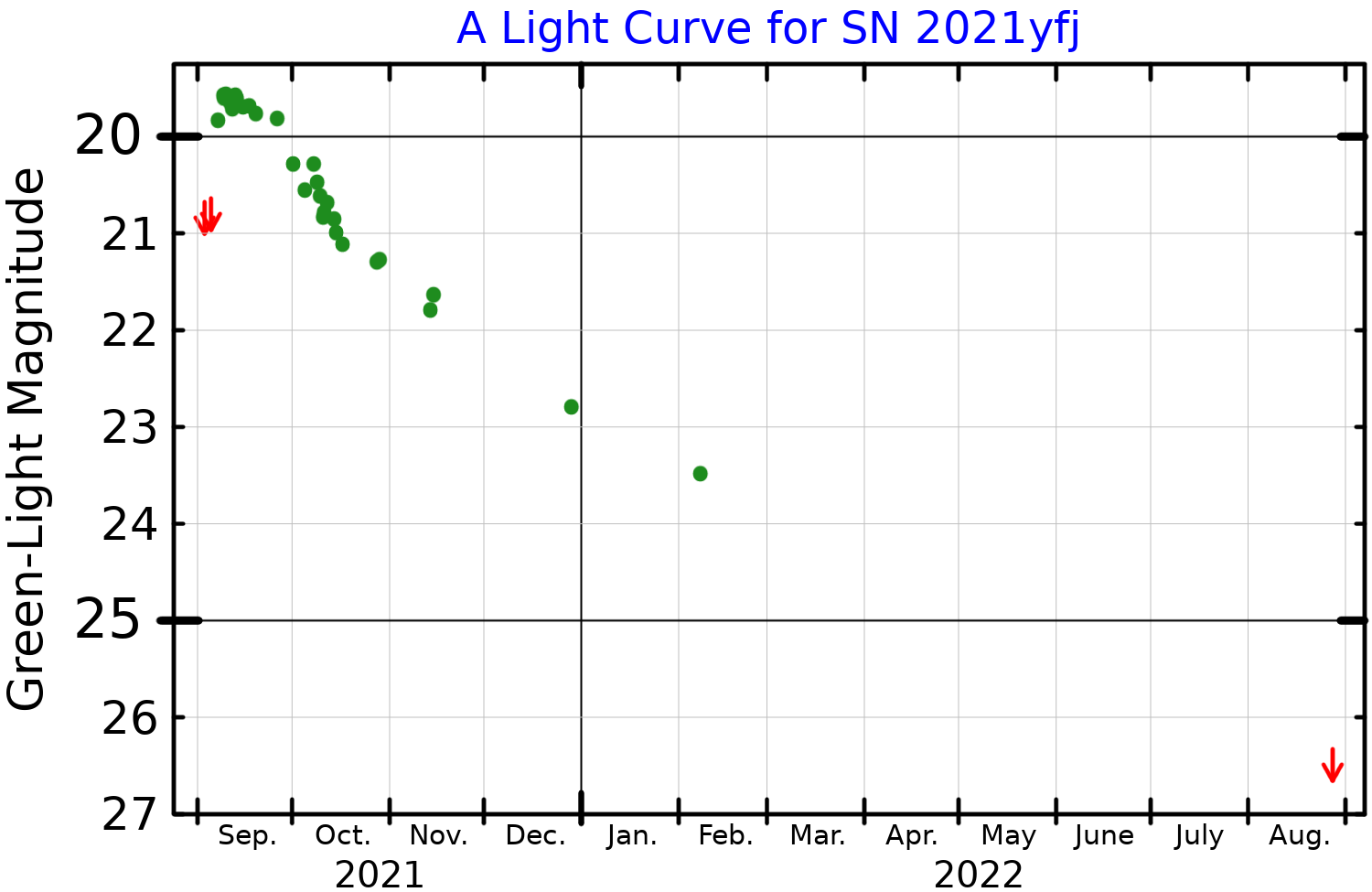
Light curves published in journal Nature by Schulze et al. (2025) of SN 2021yfj, possibly the first supernova of its type.

== Origin ==
The discoverers interpreted the progenitor as a massive star stripped down to its Si/S-rich layer and named the class by extending the IIn/Ibn/Icn sequence, which implies as-yet-undiscovered Id, Idn and Ie types. In 2026, Moriya and colleagues proposed instead a merger of two white dwarfs, which could also explain the helium, and argued that the name builds a massive-star origin into what should be a purely spectroscopic class.
