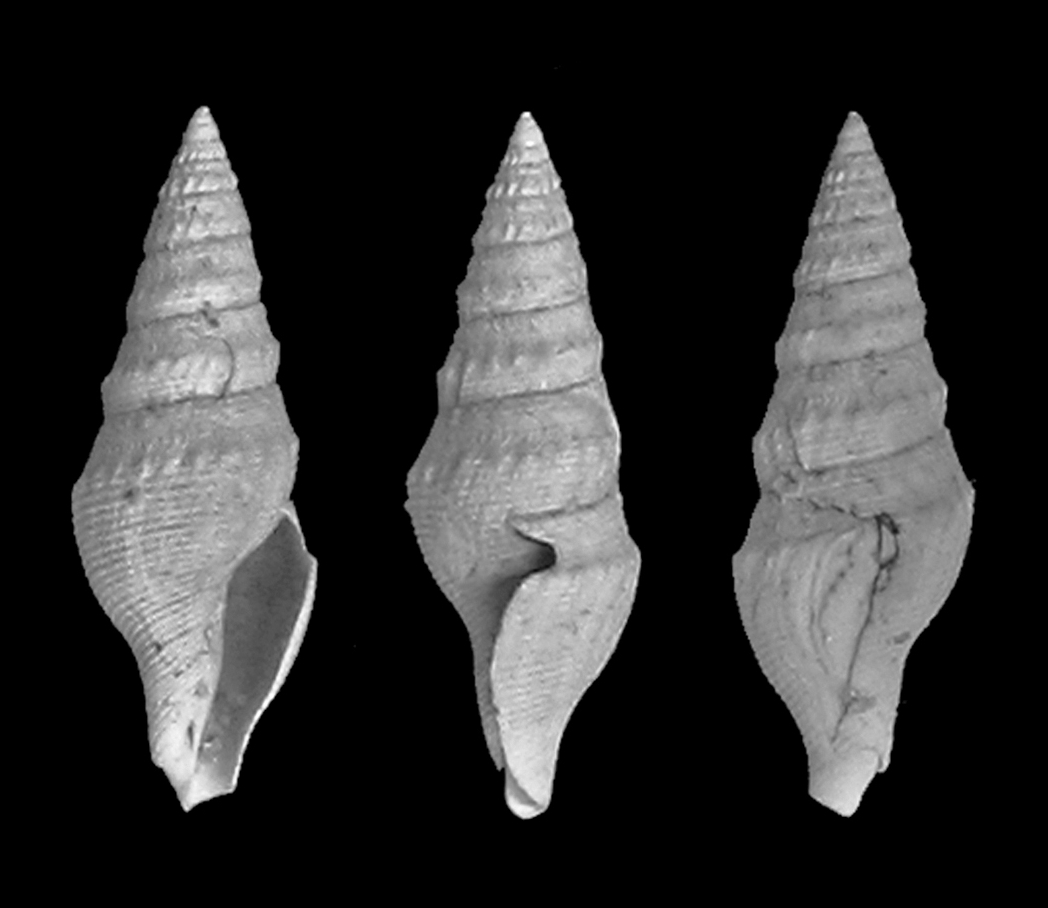
- Shells of Crassispira tenuicrenata (specimen at MNHN, Paris)

Scientific classification
- Kingdom: Animalia
- Phylum: Mollusca
- Class: Gastropoda
- Subclass: Caenogastropoda
- Order: Neogastropoda
- Superfamily: Conoidea
- Family: Pseudomelatomidae
- Genus: Crassispira
- Species: †C. tenuicrenata

Binomial name
- †Crassispira tenuicrenata (Cossmann, 1902)

Synonyms
- † Drillia tenuicrenata Cossmann, 1902

= Crassispira tenuicrenata =

Crassispira tenuicrenata is an extinct species of sea snail. It is a marine gastropod mollusk in the family Pseudomelatomidae. This particular species provides a valuable marker for Paleogene-era marine faunas, as its fossil remains are confined to a specific time and geographic region, particularly the deposits of the Eocene epoch.

== Description and taxonomy ==
The length of the shell attains 10 mm. It likely originated from the Eocene epoch, making it one of the numerous species of turreted gastropods that diversified during this time. The overall shell morphology of species within the genus Crassispira generally features a fusiform shape, meaning it tapers to a point at each end, with a prominent spire and a relatively small aperture.

C. tenuicrenata was originally named Drillia tenuicrenata by Cossmann in his extensive catalog of Eocene mollusks from the Paris Basin. The defining characteristics that led to its placement, first in Drillia and later in Crassispira, relate to the specific sculpture of the shell, including axial ribs and spiral cords, as well as the morphology of the anal sinus (a notch on the outer lip of the aperture typical of many Conoidea). The analysis of these features is crucial for differentiating it from other co-occurring turrid species in the fossil record.

=== Characteristics of the Crassispira genus ===
The genus Crassispira, to which C. tenuicrenata belongs, comprises mostly small to medium-sized predatory sea snails. Extant species are found worldwide in tropical to subtropical marine waters. Key characteristics of the genus typically include an elongate, solid, and fusiform shell, often featuring a strong, nodulose sculpture. A distinctive feature is the deep anal sinus, which is usually located on a subsutural ramp and is often bordered by a raised rib or fasciole. This genus is a significant component of the Pseudomelatomidae family, which is one of the most speciose groups among the predatory Conoidea.

== Distribution and paleoenvironment ==
As an extinct species, its distribution is known only from its fossil record. Fossils have been found in the Paris Basin, France. The Eocene deposits of the Paris Basin, specifically the various sands and marls, represent ancient shallow marine and lagoonal environments. The presence of Crassispira tenuicrenata in these sediments indicates that it was part of a diverse tropical to subtropical marine community that thrived in the shallow seas covering the area during the early Paleogene. The habitat was likely rich in other invertebrates, including bivalves and various other gastropods, which are often found alongside C. tenuicrenata fossils.
