= Hemifusome =

Intracellular organelle

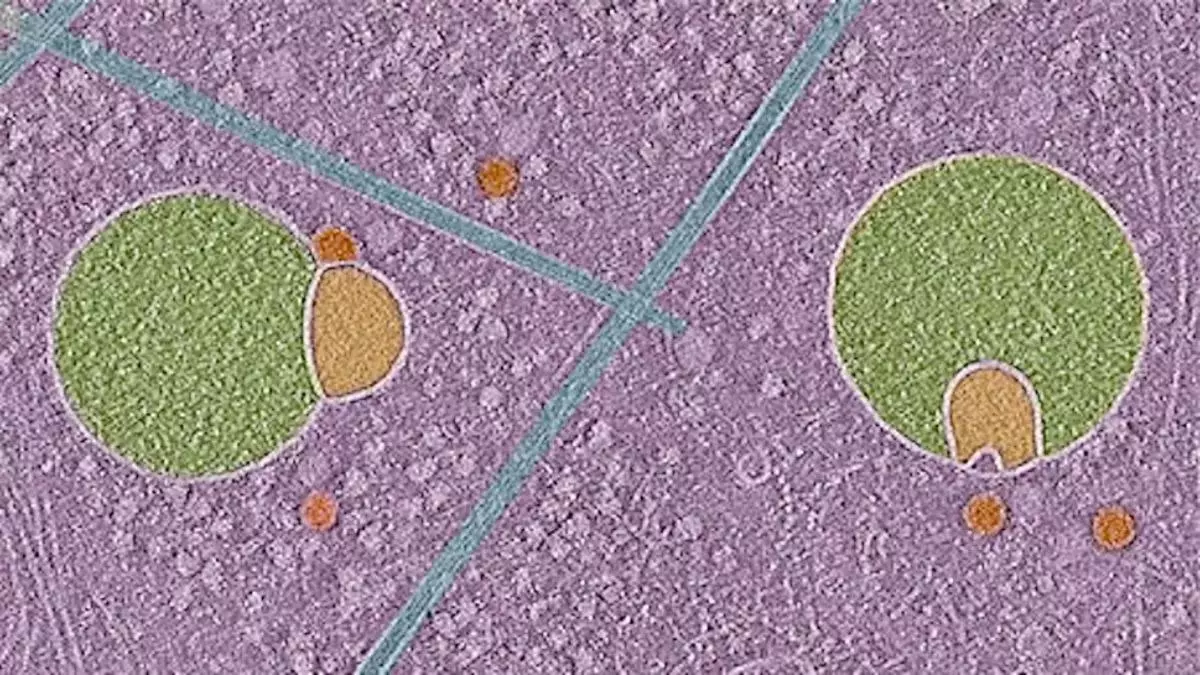
The green and orange structures in this image are hemifusomes, newly discovered organelles that may represent a previously unrecognized pathway for recycling in human cells.

Hemifusomes are intracellular organelles first described in 2025 by researchers at the National Institutes of Health and the University of Virginia School of Medicine. Discovered using in situ cryo-electron tomography, hemifusomes are heterotypic vesicular complexes consisting of a smaller translucent vesicle and a larger granular vesicle connected by an extended hemifusion diaphragm (HD)—a shared bilayer structure that is remarkably stable and large (~0.9 nm diameter). These organelles account for up to 10% of vesicular structures at the cell periphery and are consistently associated with a 42-nanometer proteolipid nanodroplet (PND) embedded at the rim of the hemifusion diaphragm.

Hemifusomes exist in two primary conformations: direct hemifusomes, where the smaller vesicle is hemifused to the cytoplasmic side of the larger vesicle, and flipped hemifusomes, where the smaller vesicle is internal and hemifused to the luminal side. They frequently contain intraluminal vesicles but do not participate in conventional endocytic pathways, as demonstrated by gold nanoparticle uptake experiments.

These organelles are proposed to act as platforms for de novo vesiculogenesis via an ESCRT-independent mechanism (Endosomal Sorting Complexes Required for Transport -independent mechanism) for multivesicular body formation. The PND is hypothesized to serve as a hub for membrane assembly, initiating the formation of new vesicles within the hemifusome complex. Their unique membrane topology, with the hemifusion diaphragm formed by two exoplasmic leaflets, may facilitate protein and lipid sorting. The overall structure of a hemifusome has been likened to a snowman wearing a scarf.
