= SN 2021yfj =

Unusual supernova

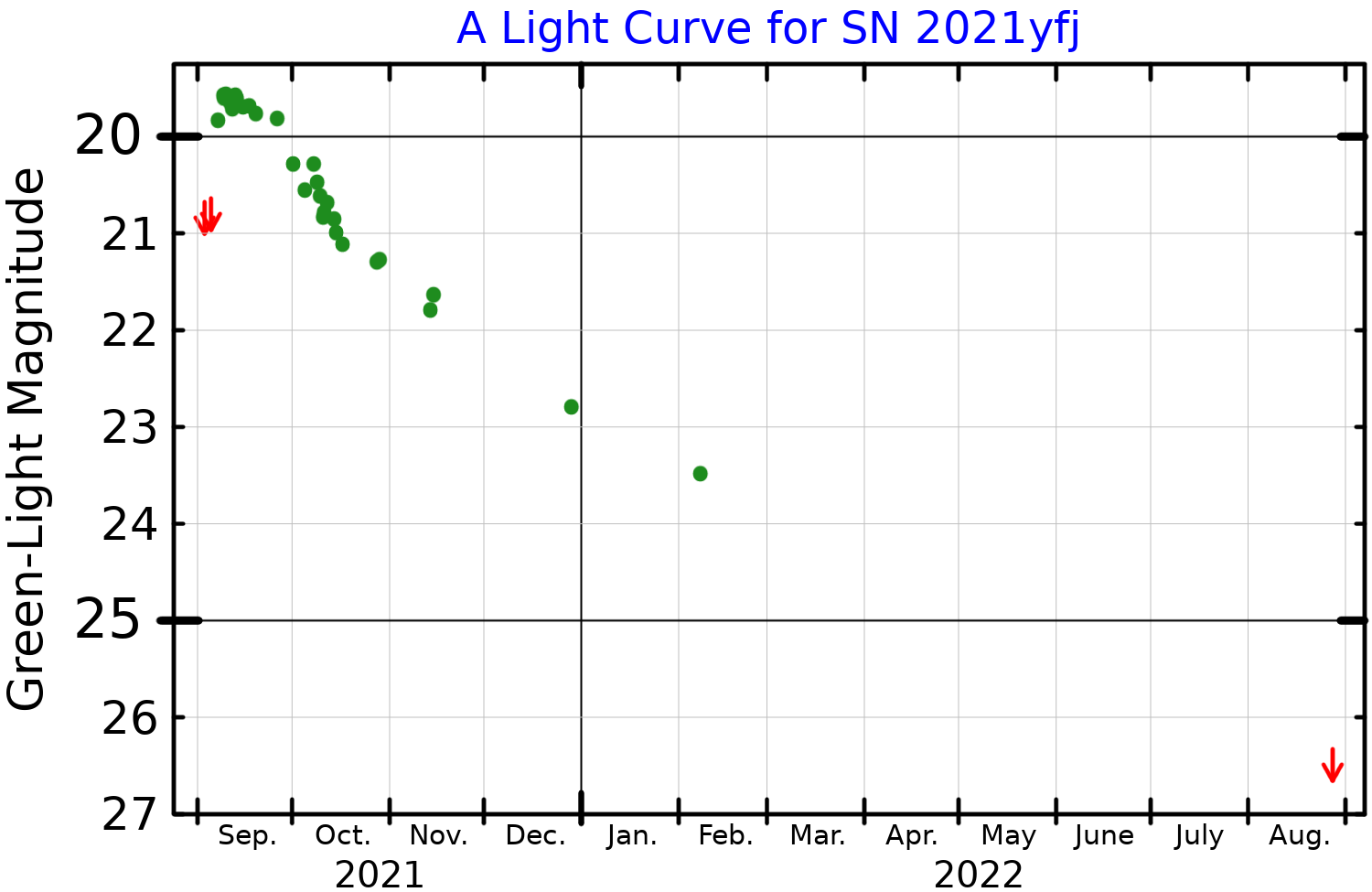
- A green-light light curve for SN 2021yfj, plotted from data published by Schulze et al.. The red arrows show upper limits from nondetections.
- Event type: Supernova
- Ien
- Date: 2021
- Constellation: Cetus
- Right ascension: 01^{h} 37^{m} 46.17^{s}
- Declination: −01° 15′ 17.8″
- Epoch: J2000
- Galactic coordinates: SDSS J013746.19-011518.6
- Distance: 2.2 billion ly
- Notable features: Unusual spectra

SN 2021yfj was a supernova discovered in 2021 and the first example of the proposed Type Ien class. It occurred roughly 2.2 billion light years from Earth in the host galaxy SDSS J013746.19-011518.6.

Its spectra were dominated by narrow emission lines of ionized silicon, sulfur and argon, with no hydrogen and no prominent carbon or oxygen features. They show that the explosion ran into a thick, massive shell of silicon- and sulfur-rich material expelled shortly beforehand, implying a star stripped down to its oxygen/silicon/sulfur-rich layer. Weak helium lines were also detected, which is hard to explain for such a deeply stripped star.

== History ==
It was first seen at 09:56 UTC on September 7, 2021 by the Zwicky Transient Facility. Because of its unusual spectra, its discoverers proposed a new classification, Type Ien. This also implies an intermediate, not yet observed Type Idn with spectra dominated by oxygen, neon or magnesium. Moriya and colleagues have questioned the name, arguing that it assumes a massive-star origin rather than describing the spectrum alone.

== Progenitor ==
The discovery team considered three scenarios. In the first, a high-mass star underwent pulsational pair-instability eruptions whose ejected shells later collided; this matches most observations but struggles to explain the helium. In the second, a lower-mass massive star shed its envelope through silicon-flash-driven winds or a jet-driven explosion. In the third, two compact objects such as white dwarfs or neutron stars merged.

In 2026, Moriya and colleagues developed the white-dwarf option. In their model, a white dwarf accreting helium from a companion builds up a silicon- and sulfur-rich outer layer. When it later merges with a second white dwarf, that layer is tidally stripped to form the surrounding shell, and leftover helium accounts for the observed helium lines.

== See also ==
- List of supernovae
