= Paris Basin =

Major geological region of France

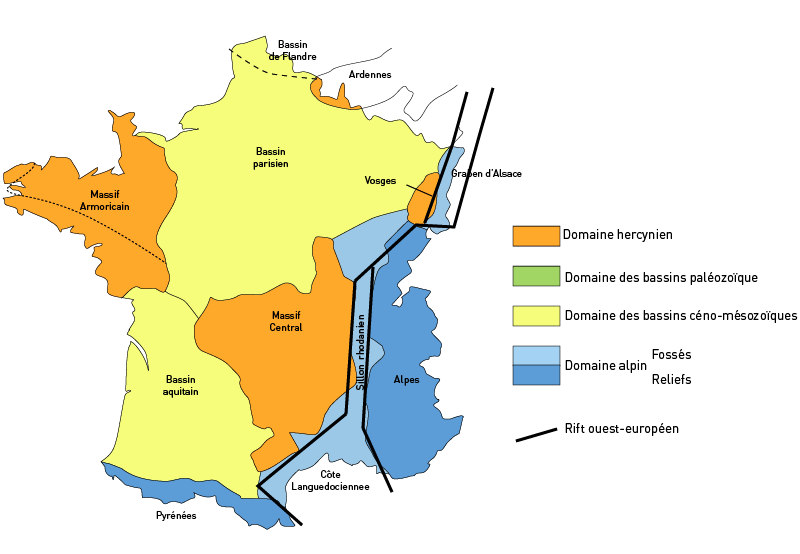
Paris Basin

The Paris Basin (French: Bassin parisien) is one of the major geological regions of France. It developed since the Triassic over remnant uplands of the Variscan orogeny (Hercynian orogeny). The sedimentary basin, no longer a single drainage basin, is a large sag in the craton, bordered by the Armorican Massif to the west, the Ardennes-Brabant axis to the north, the Massif des Vosges to the east, and the Massif Central to the south.

== Extent ==
The region usually regarded as the Paris Basin is rather smaller than the area formed by the geological structure. The former occupies the centre of the northern half of the country, excluding Eastern France. The latter extends from the hills just south of Calais to Poitiers and from Caen to the brink of the middle Rhine Valley, east of Saarbrücken.

== Geography ==
The landscape is one of very broad valleys (flood plains), modest watershed hills and well-drained plateaux of comparatively little altitude. In the south-east and east the plain of Champagne and the Seuil de Bourgogne (Threshold of Burgundy) differential erosion of the strata has left low scarps with the dip slopes towards the centre. The varying nature of the clays, limestones and chalk gives rise to the characteristics of the regions such as Champagne Humide (Damp Champagne), Champagne Pouilleuse (poor Champagne), the Pays de Caux and the Pays de Bray.

Due to the millions of years of later deposition, erosion and other changes since, five drainage basins today drain almost all of the Basin.

These are two flowing north, the basins/specified parts of basins as follows:

- upper Moselle and upper Meuse

And three flowing west, the:

- Seine basin, central Loire basin and Somme.

== Structure ==
The Paris Basin is a geological basin of sedimentary rocks. It overlies geological strata folded by the Variscan orogeny.

It forms a broad shallow bowl in which marine deposits from throughout periods from the Triassic to the Pliocene were laid down. Their extent generally decreases with time. Based on analysis of fossils recognized in the basin's strata during the 1820s and 1830s, the pioneering geologist Charles Lyell divided the Tertiary into three ages he named the Pliocene, the Miocene and the Eocene.

To the west, the strata folded by the Variscan rise below the more recent marine deposits in the hills of Brittany and, to the east, the Ardennes, Hunsrück and Vosges. To the south, the basin borders on the Massif Central and the Morvan. To the north, its early strata match those of the bed of the English Channel and south-eastern England. Other boundaries lie on ridges in more recent deposits and scarps (escarpments). These include the Côte d'Or in the south-east (on an Alpine fault line) and, at a north end, the Hills of (French: Collines d') Artois which overlie the margin of London-Brabant Massif.

=== Geological Significance of the Paris Basin Fossil Finds ===
The fossil record of the Paris Basin is critically important for Paleogene paleontology and stratigraphy. The basin's continuous, well-exposed, and richly fossiliferous marine and non-marine successions provide a comprehensive record of biotic changes across the Paleocene and Eocene epochs. The detailed documentation of species like Crassispira tenuicrenata allows paleontologists to:

- Establish Biostratigraphic Correlation: These distinct mollusk assemblages help correlate sedimentary layers across different regions of the basin and even with other European Paleogene basins.
- Track Faunal Evolution: The fossils record the dramatic diversification of marine life following the Cretaceous-Paleogene extinction event, illustrating the evolutionary history of groups like the Conoidea.
- Reconstruct Paleoenvironments: The characteristics of the fossilized organisms, such as the small, predatory nature of C. tenuicrenata, help researchers infer details about the water depth, temperature, and substrate of the ancient Eocene environment.

== Oil fields ==
Two notable oil fields are the Chaunoy Field, the other is the Villeperdue Field. They are centred at about 1850 metre depth.

== See also ==
- Geologic time scale
- List of fossil sites (with link directory)

== Sources ==
- Anon. Carte Géologique de la France à l'Échelle du Millionième ISBN 2-7159-2158-6
- Dercourt, J. (2002). Géologie et Géodynamique de la France (3rd ed.). ISBN 2-10-006459-2.
