= Calcimitra invicta =

Scientific classification
- Kingdom: Animalia
- Phylum: Mollusca
- Class: Gastropoda
- Subclass: Caenogastropoda
- Order: Neogastropoda
- Superfamily: Mitroidea
- Family: Mitridae
- Subfamily: Mitrinae
- Genus: Calcimitra
- Species: C. invicta

Binomial name
- Calcimitra invicta (Huang & Salisbury, 2017)

Synonyms
- Mitra invicta Huang & Salisbury, 2017

Species of gastropod

Calcimitra invicta is a species of sea snail, a marine gastropod mollusk, in the family Mitridae, the miters or miter snails.
