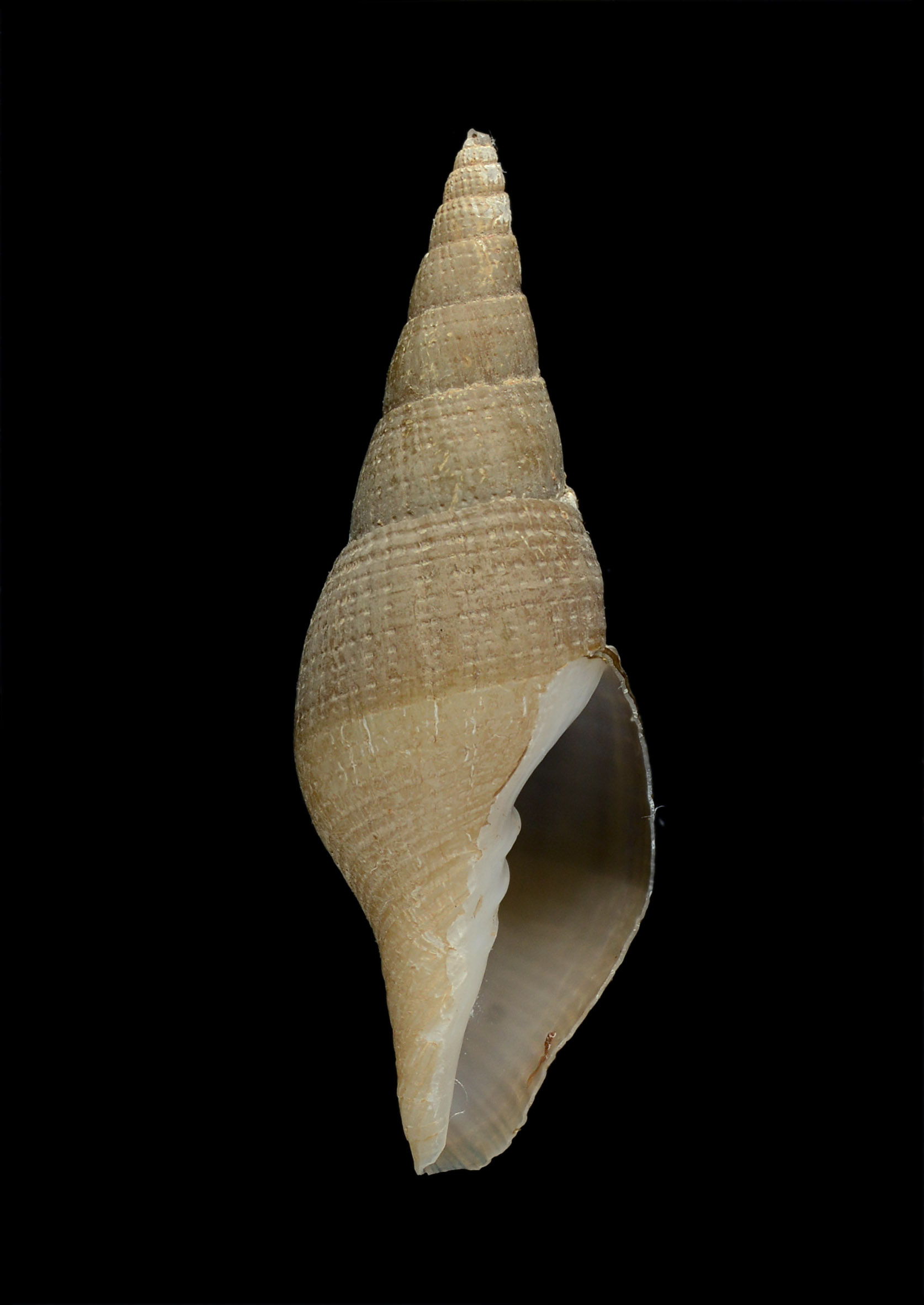
- Shell of Calcimitra glaphyria (specimen at MNHN, Paris)

Scientific classification
- Kingdom: Animalia
- Phylum: Mollusca
- Class: Gastropoda
- Subclass: Caenogastropoda
- Order: Neogastropoda
- Family: Mitridae
- Genus: Calcimitra
- Species: C. glaphyria

Binomial name
- Calcimitra glaphyria (Turner, 2001)

Synonyms
- Mitra glaphyria Turner, 2001

= Calcimitra glaphyria =

Species of gastropod

Calcimitra glaphyria is a species of sea snail, a marine gastropod mollusk in the family Mitridae, the miters or miter snails.

== Distribution ==
This marine species occurs off Papua New Guinea.
