= Calcimitra morchii =

Scientific classification
- Kingdom: Animalia
- Phylum: Mollusca
- Class: Gastropoda
- Subclass: Caenogastropoda
- Order: Neogastropoda
- Superfamily: Mitroidea
- Family: Mitridae
- Subfamily: Mitrinae
- Genus: Calcimitra
- Species: C. morchii

Binomial name
- Calcimitra morchii (A. Adams, 1855)

Synonyms
- Cancilla herklotsiana (Dohrn, 1861); Cancilla morchii (A. Adams, 1855); Mitra (Tiara) morchii A. Adams, 1855; Mitra herklotsiana Dohrn, 1861; Mitra morchii A. Adams, 1855

Species of gastropod

Calcimitra morchii is a species of sea snail, a marine gastropod mollusk, in the family Mitridae, the miters or miter snails.

== Description ==
This species attains a size of 63 mm.

== Distribution ==
Pacific Ocean, Philippines.
