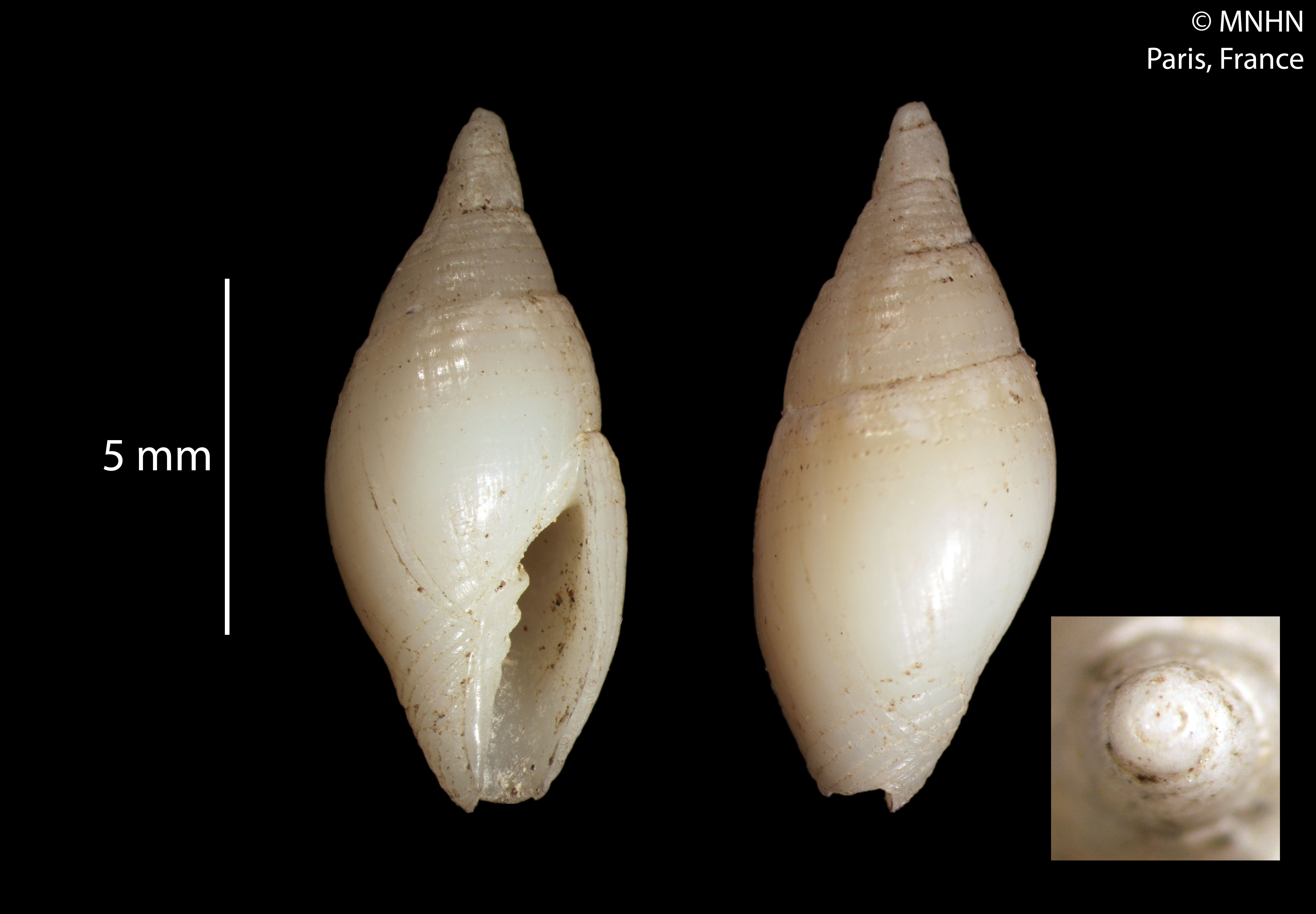
- Shell of Probata espinosai (paratype at MNHN, Paris)

Scientific classification
- Kingdom: Animalia
- Phylum: Mollusca
- Class: Gastropoda
- Subclass: Caenogastropoda
- Order: Neogastropoda
- Superfamily: Mitroidea
- Family: Mitridae
- Genus: Probata
- Species: P. espinosai

Binomial name
- Probata espinosai (Sarasúa, 1978)

Synonyms
- Mitra espinosai Sarasúa, 1978

= Probata espinosai =

Species of gastropod

Probata espinosai is a species of sea snail, a marine gastropod mollusk in the family Mitridae, the miters or miter snails.

== Distribution ==
This marine species occurs off Cuba.
