= Calcimitra arnoldeyasi =

Scientific classification
- Kingdom: Animalia
- Phylum: Mollusca
- Class: Gastropoda
- Subclass: Caenogastropoda
- Order: Neogastropoda
- Family: Mitridae
- Genus: Calcimitra
- Species: C. arnoldeyasi

Binomial name
- Calcimitra arnoldeyasi (Poppe, Tagaro & Salisbury, 2009)

Synonyms
- Mitra arnoldeyasi Poppe, Tagaro & Salisbury, 2009; Mitra arnoldi Poppe, Tagaro & Salisbury, 2009 (Invalid: junior homonym of Mitra arnoldi Verco, 1909; renamed Mitra arnoldeyasi)

Species of gastropod

Calcimitra arnoldeyasi is a species of sea snail, a marine gastropod mollusk in the family Mitridae, the miters or miter snails.
