= Calcimitra marrowi =

Scientific classification
- Kingdom: Animalia
- Phylum: Mollusca
- Class: Gastropoda
- Subclass: Caenogastropoda
- Order: Neogastropoda
- Family: Mitridae
- Genus: Calcimitra
- Species: C. marrowi

Binomial name
- Calcimitra marrowi (Turner, 2001)

Synonyms
- Mitra marrowi Turner, 2001

Species of gastropod

Calcimitra marrowi is a species of sea snail, a marine gastropod mollusk in the family Mitridae, the miters or miter snails.
