= Calcimitra christinae =

Scientific classification
- Kingdom: Animalia
- Phylum: Mollusca
- Class: Gastropoda
- Subclass: Caenogastropoda
- Order: Neogastropoda
- Family: Mitridae
- Genus: Calcimitra
- Species: C. christinae

Binomial name
- Calcimitra christinae (Poppe, 2008)

Species of gastropod

Calcimitra christinae is a species of sea snail, a marine gastropod mollusk in the family Mitridae.

== Original description ==
- (of Mitra christinae Poppe, 2008) Poppe G.T. (2008) New Fissurellidae, Epitoniidae, Aclididae, Mitridae and Costellariidae from the Philippines. Visaya 2(3): 37-63. [Published August 2008] page(s): 41

Shell size 60-65 mm.

== Distribution ==
Philippines.
