= Calcimitra triplicata =

Scientific classification
- Kingdom: Animalia
- Phylum: Mollusca
- Class: Gastropoda
- Subclass: Caenogastropoda
- Order: Neogastropoda
- Family: Mitridae
- Genus: Calcimitra
- Species: C. triplicata

Binomial name
- Calcimitra triplicata (Martens, 1904)

Synonyms
- Mitra triplicata Martens, 1904

Species of gastropod

Calcimitra triplicata is a species of sea snail, a marine gastropod mollusk in the family Mitridae, the miters or miter snails.

== Description ==
Shell size 75-80 mm.

== Distribution ==
Northern Pacific Ocean: Japan.
