= Calcimitra kingtsio =

Scientific classification
- Kingdom: Animalia
- Phylum: Mollusca
- Class: Gastropoda
- Subclass: Caenogastropoda
- Order: Neogastropoda
- Superfamily: Mitroidea
- Family: Mitridae
- Subfamily: Mitrinae
- Genus: Calcimitra
- Species: C. kingtsio

Binomial name
- Calcimitra kingtsio Huang, 2011

Species of gastropod

Calcimitra kingtsio is a species of sea snail, a marine gastropod mollusk, in the family Mitridae, the miters or miter snails.
