= Calcimitra salva =

Scientific classification
- Kingdom: Animalia
- Phylum: Mollusca
- Class: Gastropoda
- Subclass: Caenogastropoda
- Order: Neogastropoda
- Family: Mitridae
- Genus: Calcimitra
- Species: C. salva

Binomial name
- Calcimitra salva (Turner, 2001)

Synonyms
- Mitra salva Turner, 2001

Species of gastropod

Calcimitra salva is a species of sea snail, a marine gastropod mollusk in the family Mitridae, the miters or miter snails.
