= Vicimitra =

Scientific classification
- Kingdom: Animalia
- Phylum: Mollusca
- Class: Gastropoda
- Subclass: Caenogastropoda
- Order: Neogastropoda
- Superfamily: Mitroidea
- Family: Mitridae
- Genus: Vicimitra; Iredale, 1929

Species
- See text

Genus of gastropods

Vicimitra is a genus of sea snails, marine gastropod mollusks in the family Mitroidea.

== Species ==
Species within the genus Vicimitra include:

- Vicimitra prosphora Iredale, 1929

Species brought into synonymy

- Vicimitra subflava Kuroda & Habe, 1971; synonym of Calcimitra subflava (Kuroda & Habe, 1971) (original combination)
