= Calcimitra brunetta =

Scientific classification
- Kingdom: Animalia
- Phylum: Mollusca
- Class: Gastropoda
- Subclass: Caenogastropoda
- Order: Neogastropoda
- Superfamily: Mitroidea
- Family: Mitridae
- Subfamily: Mitrinae
- Genus: Calcimitra
- Species: C. brunetta

Binomial name
- Calcimitra brunetta (Chino & Herrmann, 2015)

Synonyms
- Mitra brunetta Chino & Herrmann, 2015

Species of gastropod

Calcimitra brunetta is a species of sea snail, a marine gastropod mollusk, in the family Mitridae, the miters or miter snails.
