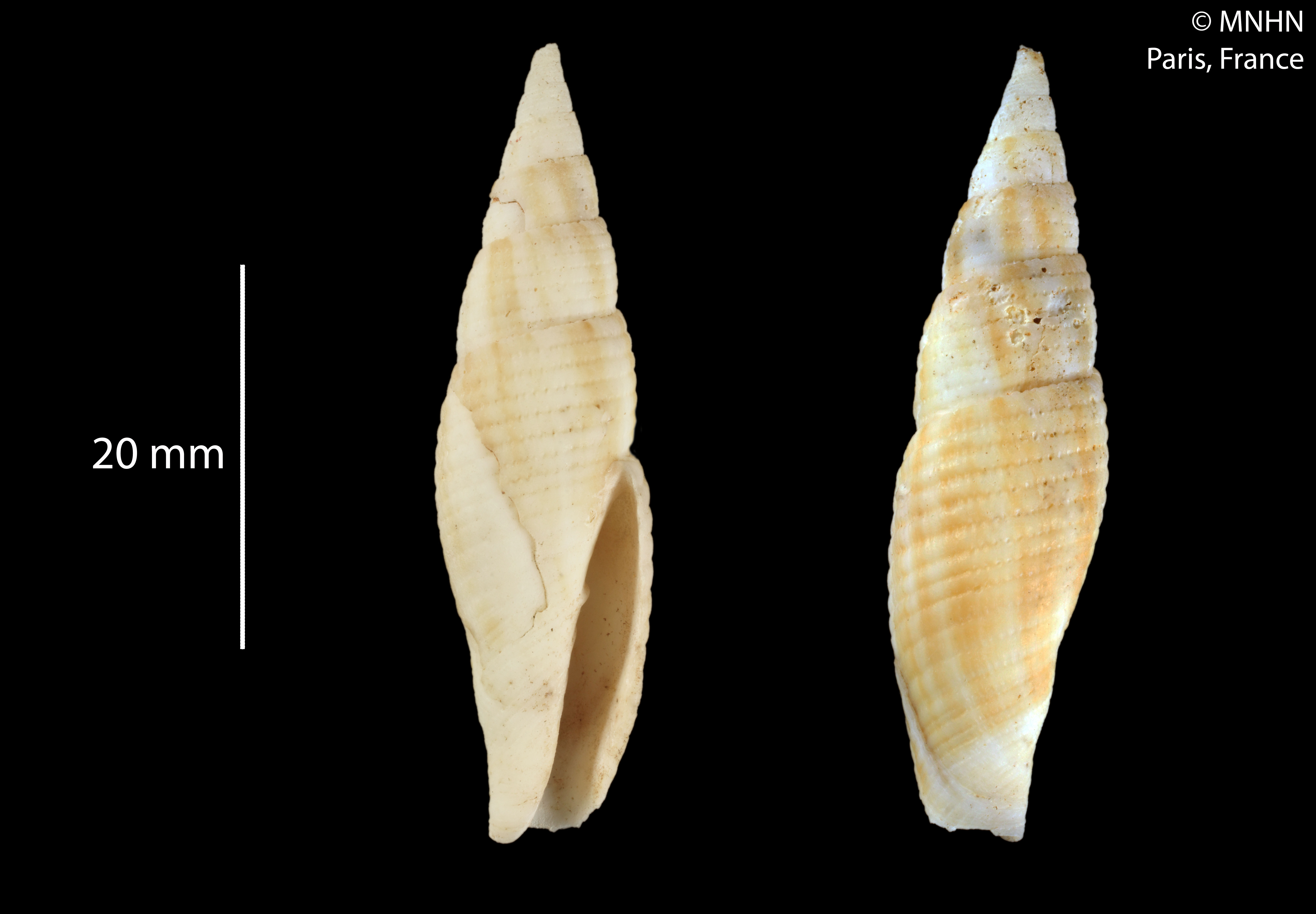
- Shell of Calcimitra meyeriana (holotype at MNHN, Paris)

Scientific classification
- Kingdom: Animalia
- Phylum: Mollusca
- Class: Gastropoda
- Subclass: Caenogastropoda
- Order: Neogastropoda
- Family: Mitridae
- Genus: Calcimitra
- Species: C. poppei

Binomial name
- Calcimitra poppei (Guillot de Suduiraut, 2000)

Synonyms
- Mitra poppei Guillot de Suduiraut, 2000

= Calcimitra poppei =

Species of gastropod

Calcimitra poppei is a species of sea snail, a marine gastropod mollusk in the family Mitridae, the miters or miter snails.

== Distribution ==
This marine species occurs off the Philippines.
