= Calcimitra brinkae =

Scientific classification
- Kingdom: Animalia
- Phylum: Mollusca
- Class: Gastropoda
- Subclass: Caenogastropoda
- Order: Neogastropoda
- Family: Mitridae
- Genus: Calcimitra
- Species: C. brinkae

Binomial name
- Calcimitra brinkae (Salisbury & Kilburn, 1996)

Synonyms
- Mitra brinkae Salisbury & Kilburn, 1996

Species of gastropod

Calcimitra brinkae is a species of sea snail, a marine gastropod mollusk in the family Mitridae, the miters or miter snails.
