= Calcimitra lussii =

Scientific classification
- Kingdom: Animalia
- Phylum: Mollusca
- Class: Gastropoda
- Subclass: Caenogastropoda
- Order: Neogastropoda
- Family: Mitridae
- Genus: Calcimitra
- Species: C. lussii

Binomial name
- Calcimitra lussii (Turner & Salisbury, 2007)

Synonyms
- Mitra lussii Turner & Salisbury, 2007

Species of gastropod

Calcimitra lussii is a species of sea snail, a marine gastropod mollusk in the family Mitridae, the miters or miter snails.
