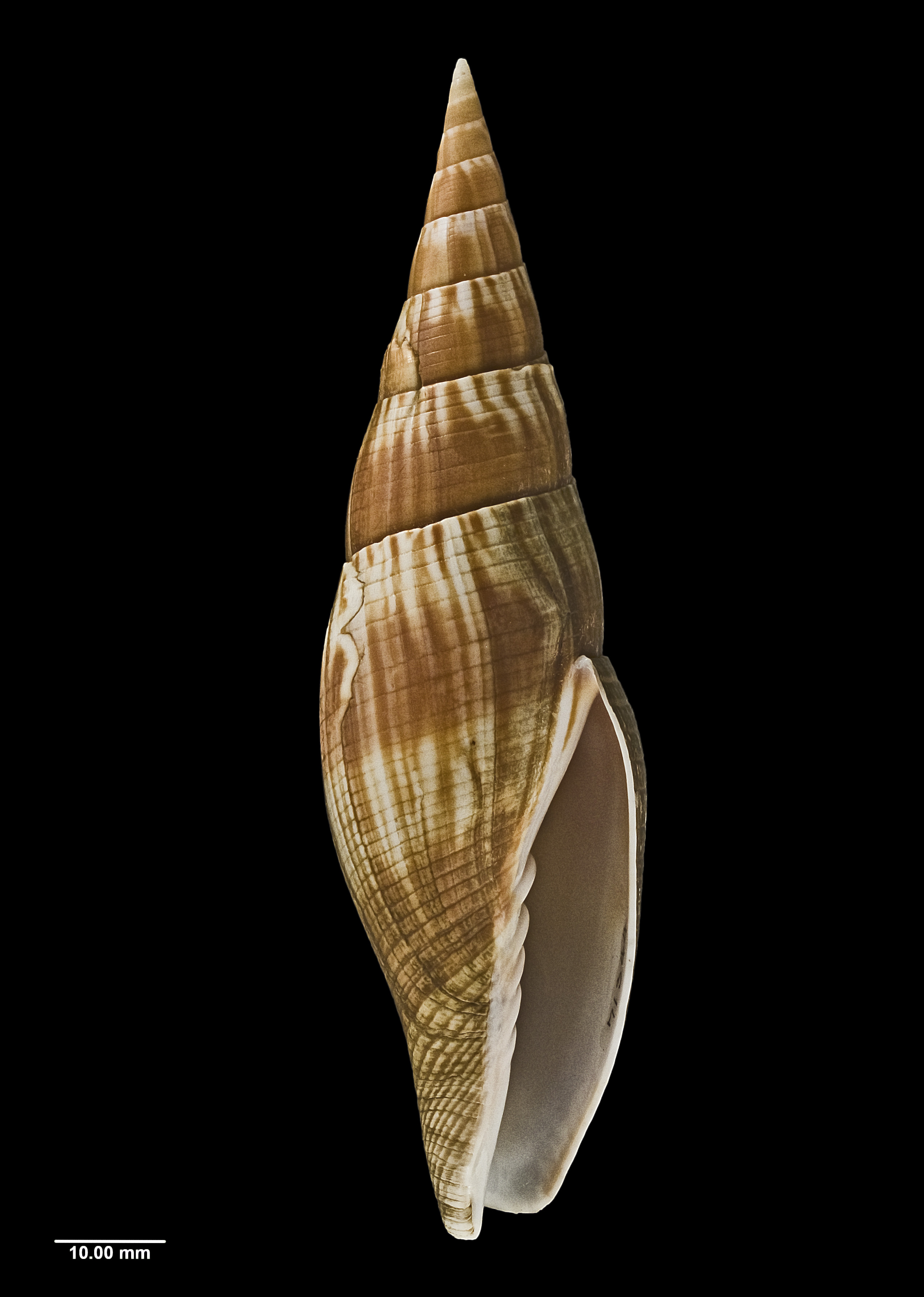
- Holotype held by the Auckland War Memorial Museum

Scientific classification
- Kingdom: Animalia
- Phylum: Mollusca
- Class: Gastropoda
- Subclass: Caenogastropoda
- Order: Neogastropoda
- Family: Mitridae
- Genus: Calcimitra
- Species: C. hilli

Binomial name
- Calcimitra hilli (Cernohorsky, 1976)

Synonyms
- Mitra hilli Cernohorsky, 1976

= Calcimitra hilli =

Species of gastropod

Calcimitra hilli is a species of sea snail, a marine gastropod mollusk in the family Mitridae, the miters or miter snails.
