= Calcimitra verweyi =

Scientific classification
- Kingdom: Animalia
- Phylum: Mollusca
- Class: Gastropoda
- Subclass: Caenogastropoda
- Order: Neogastropoda
- Superfamily: Mitroidea
- Family: Mitridae
- Subfamily: Mitrinae
- Genus: Calcimitra
- Species: C. verweyi

Binomial name
- Calcimitra verweyi (Knudsen, 1970)

Synonyms
- Mitra verweyi Knudsen, 1970

Species of gastropod

Calcimitra verweyi is a species of sea snail, a marine gastropod mollusk, in the family Mitridae, the miters or miter snails.
