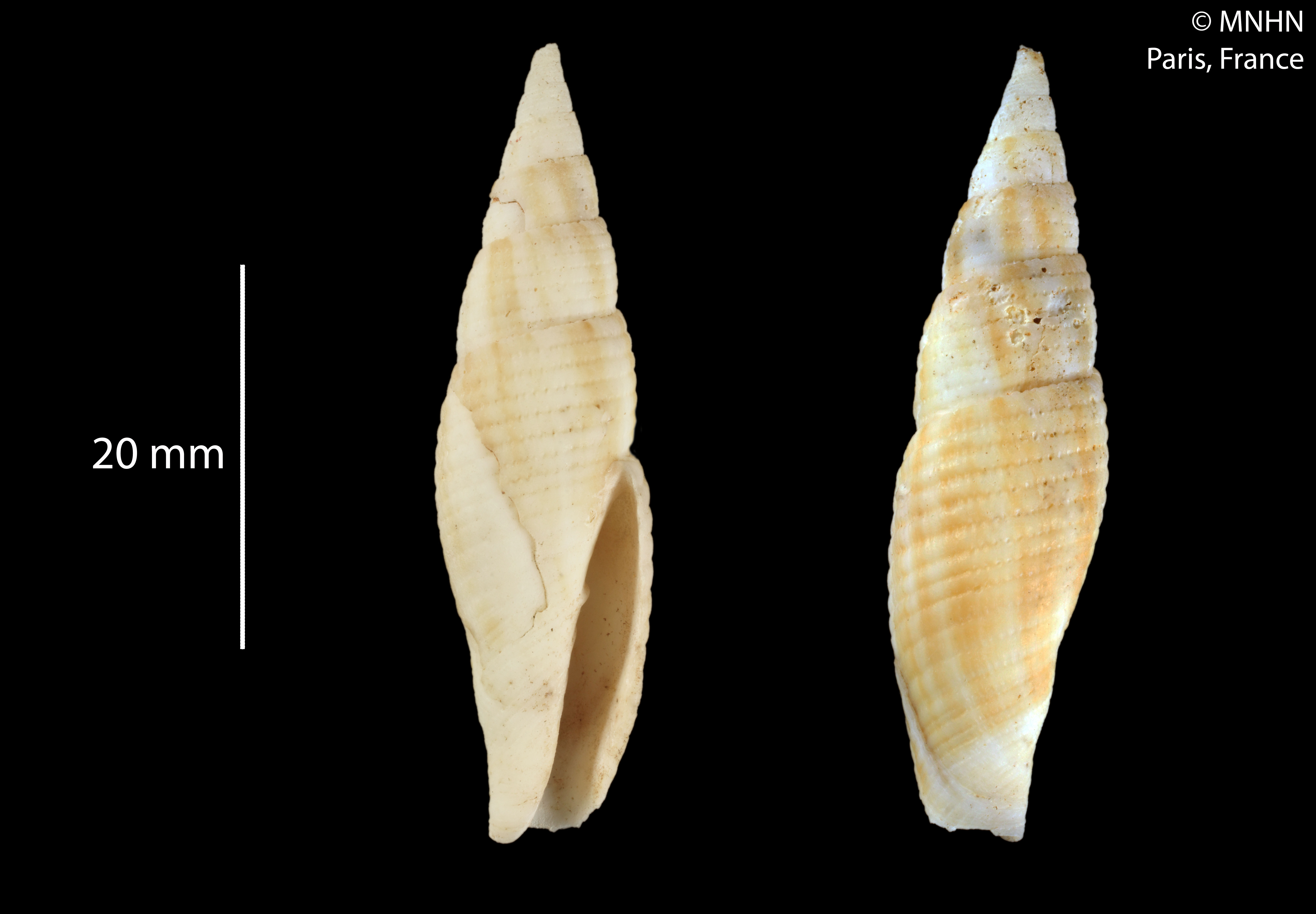
- Shell of Calcimitra meyeriana (paratype at MNHN, Paris)

Scientific classification
- Kingdom: Animalia
- Phylum: Mollusca
- Class: Gastropoda
- Subclass: Caenogastropoda
- Order: Neogastropoda
- Family: Mitridae
- Genus: Calcimitra
- Species: C. meyeriana

Binomial name
- Calcimitra meyeriana (Salisbury, 1992)

Synonyms
- Cancilla meyeriana Salisbury, 1992

= Calcimitra meyeriana =

Species of gastropod

Calcimitra meyeriana is a species of sea snail, a marine gastropod mollusk in the family Mitridae, the miters or miter snails.

== Distribution ==
This marine species occurs off Natal, South Africa.
