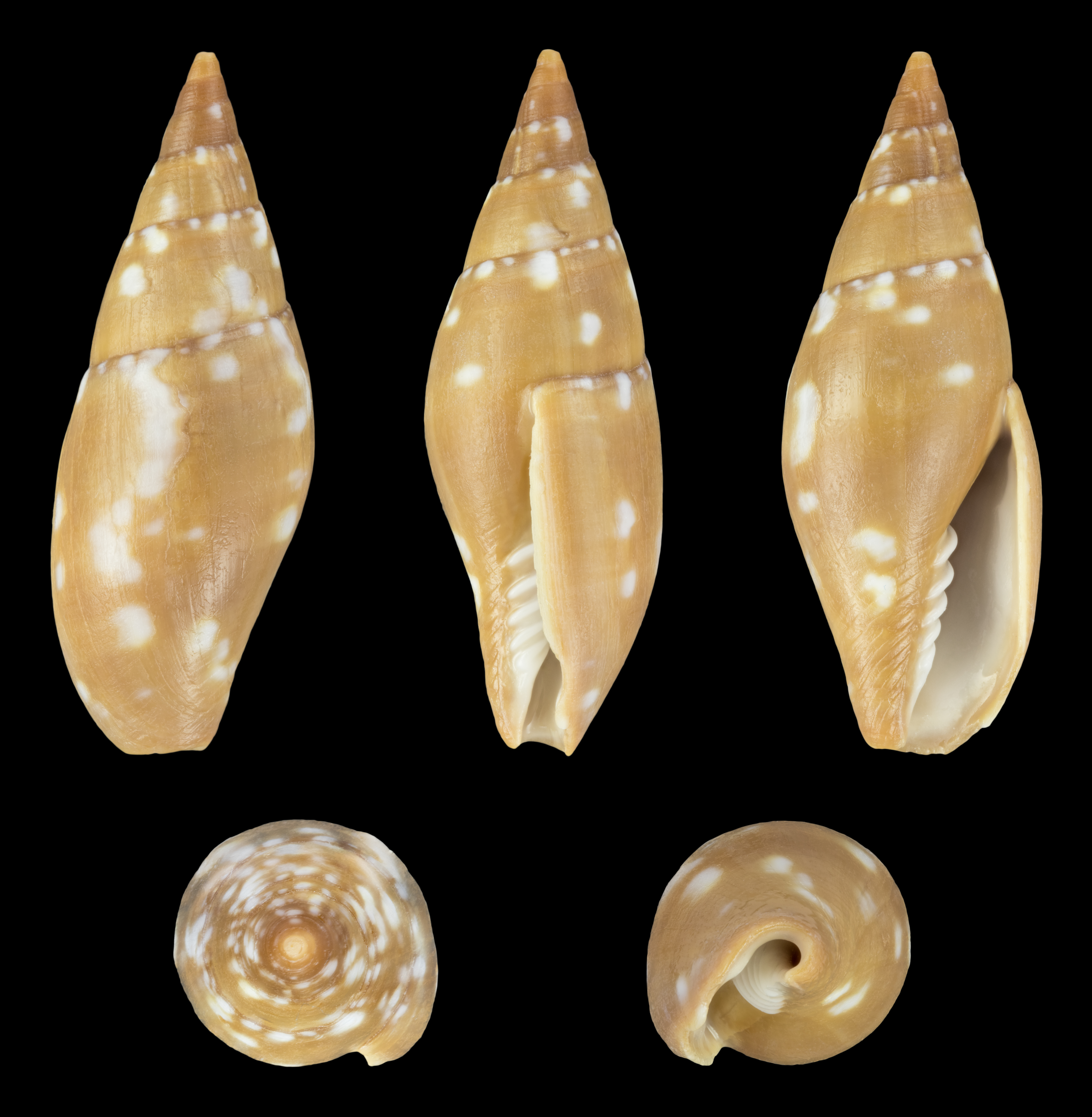

Scientific classification
- Kingdom: Animalia
- Phylum: Mollusca
- Class: Gastropoda
- Subclass: Caenogastropoda
- Order: Neogastropoda
- Family: Mitridae
- Genus: Probata
- Species: P. barbadensis

Binomial name
- Probata barbadensis (Gmelin, 1791)

Synonyms
- Murex zebrula Meuschen, 1787; Mitra barbadensis (Gmelin, 1791); Voluta barbadensis Gmelin, 1791; Voluta striatula Schröter, 1804; Mitra santomensis Félix-Alves & Fernandes, 1989

= Probata barbadensis =

Species of gastropod

Probata barbadensis is a species of sea snail, a marine gastropod mollusk in the family Mitridae, the miters or miter snails.

== Description ==
This species attains a length around 45 mm.

== Distribution ==
P. barbadensis can be found in relatively shallow water off the coast of east Florida, the Florida Keys, the Caribbean Region, and the western Atlantic south to eastern Brazil.
