= Calcimitra labecula =

Scientific classification
- Kingdom: Animalia
- Phylum: Mollusca
- Class: Gastropoda
- Subclass: Caenogastropoda
- Order: Neogastropoda
- Family: Mitridae
- Genus: Calcimitra
- Species: C. labecula

Binomial name
- Calcimitra labecula (Herrmann & Dekkers, 2009)

Synonyms
- Mitra labecula Herrmann & Dekkers, 2009

Species of gastropod

Calcimitra labecula is a species of sea snail, a marine gastropod mollusk in the family Mitridae, the miters or miter snails.
