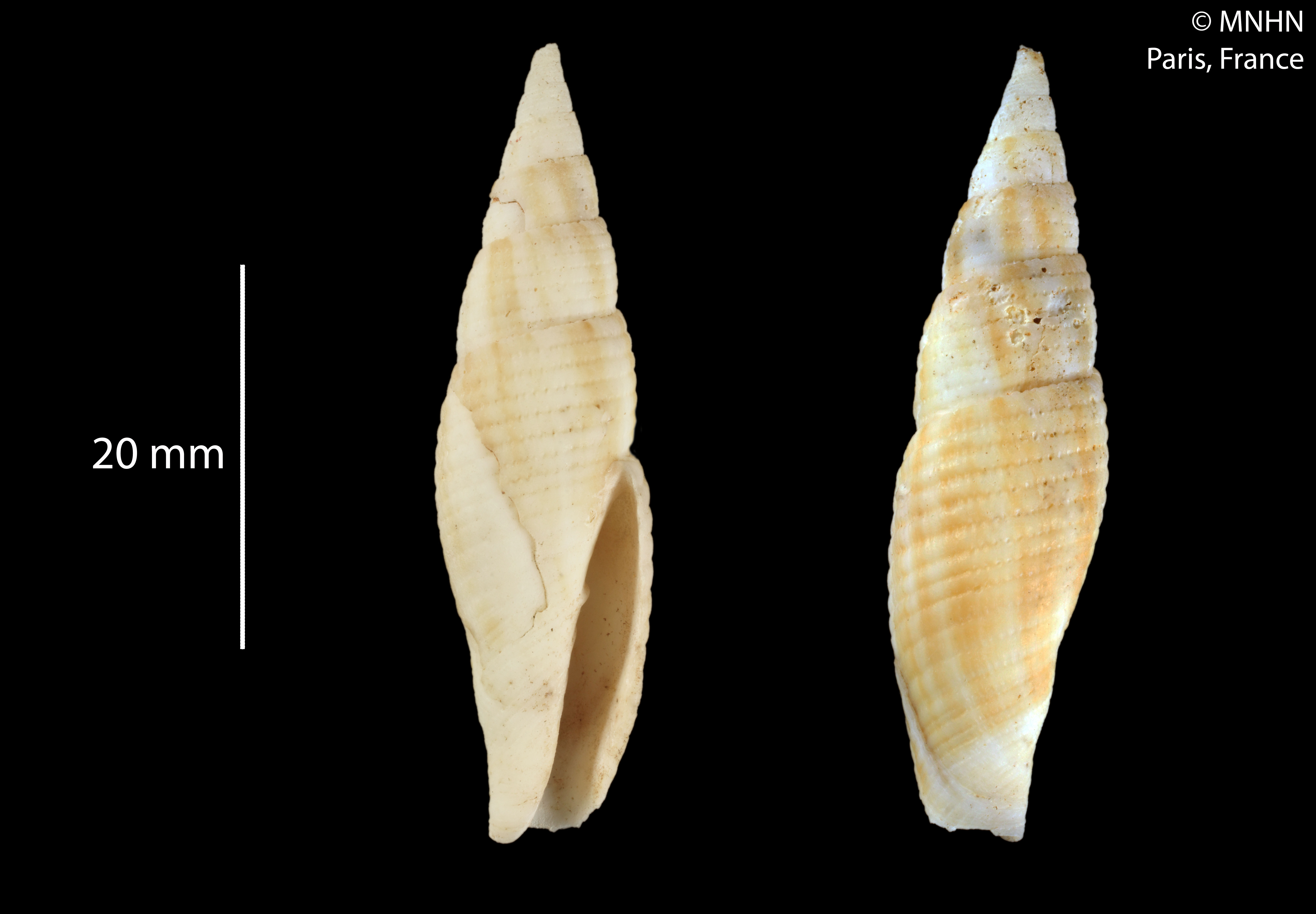
- Shell of Calcimitra meyeriana

Scientific classification
- Kingdom: Animalia
- Phylum: Mollusca
- Class: Gastropoda
- Subclass: Caenogastropoda
- Order: Neogastropoda
- Superfamily: Mitroidea
- Family: Mitridae
- Subfamily: Mitrinae
- Genus: Calcimitra; Huang, 2011

Type species
- Calcimitra kingtsio Huang, 2011

Species
- See text

= Calcimitra =

Genus of gastropods

Calcimitra is a genus of sea snails, marine gastropod mollusks in the family Mitridae.

== Species ==
Species within the genus Calcimitra include:

- Calcimitra arnoldeyasi
- Calcimitra brinkae
- Calcimitra brunetta (Chino & Herrmann, 2015)
- Calcimitra chiangfucius (S.-I Huang & R. Salisbury, 2017)
- Calcimitra chiangfucius
- Calcimitra christinae
- Calcimitra glaphyria
- Calcimitra hilli
- Calcimitra invicta (S.-I Huang & R. Salisbury, 2017)
- Calcimitra invicta
- Calcimitra kingtsio
- Calcimitra labecula
- Calcimitra lussii
- Calcimitra marrowi
- Calcimitra meyeriana
- Calcimitra morchii
- Calcimitra philippeboucheti Thach, 2020
- Calcimitra philosopha (S.-I Huang & R. Salisbury, 2017)
- Calcimitra poppei
- Calcimitra salva
- Calcimitra soela Marrow, 2020
- Calcimitra subflava
- Calcimitra taiwanbale (S.-I Huang & R. Salisbury, 2017)
- Calcimitra toi S.-I Huang & Q.-Y. Chuo, 2019
- Calcimitra triplicata
- Calcimitra verweyi
- Calcimitra wuhuai S.-I Huang & Q.-Y. Chuo, 2019

Species brought into synonymy

- Calcimitra chuoi (S.-I Huang & R. Salisbury, 2017) : synonym of Cancillopsis chuoi (S.-I Huang & R. Salisbury, 2017)
