= Magnamitra =

Scientific classification
- Kingdom: Animalia
- Phylum: Mollusca
- Class: Gastropoda
- Subclass: Caenogastropoda
- Order: Neogastropoda
- Superfamily: Mitroidea
- Family: Mitridae
- Genus: Magnamitra; Huang & Salisbury, 2017

Type species
- Magnamitra sandrogorii Huang & Salisbury, 2017

Species
- See text

Genus of gastropods

Magnamitra is a genus of sea snails, marine gastropod mollusks in the family Mitridae.

== Species ==
Species within the genus Magnamitra include:

- Magnamitra sandrogorii Huang & Salisbury, 2017
