= Pleioptygma carolinense =

Pleioptygma carolinense Temporal range: Pliocene

Scientific classification
- Kingdom: Animalia
- Phylum: Mollusca
- Class: Gastropoda
- (unranked): clade Caenogastropoda clade Hypsogastropoda clade Neogastropoda
- Superfamily: Muricoidea
- Family: Pleioptygmatidae
- Genus: Pleioptygma
- Species: † P. carolinense

Binomial name
- Pleioptygma carolinense (Conrad, 1840)

Synonyms
- Voluta carolinensis Conrad, 1840; Pleioptygma carolinensis

Extinct species of gastropod

Pleioptygma carolinense is an extinct species of sea snail, a marine gastropod mollusk in the family Pleioptygmatidae.

Pleioptygma carolinensis is the type species of the genus Pleioptygma.

== Distribution ==
This species is found in the Pliocene deposits of North Carolina. The type locality is Duplin County, North Carolina.

== Description ==
The type description of Pleioptygma carolinensis originally described as Voluta carolinensis by Timothy Abbott Conrad (1840) reads as follows:

Voluta Carolinensis. — Shell subfusiform; whorls deeply channeled below the suture; superior margin of the channel carinated;

spire elevated, with prominent, rather distant acute spiral lines on the three or four superior whorls; large whorl with obscure, distant spiral lines, except towards the base, which is sulcated, and strongly

striated. Length 3 inches.
