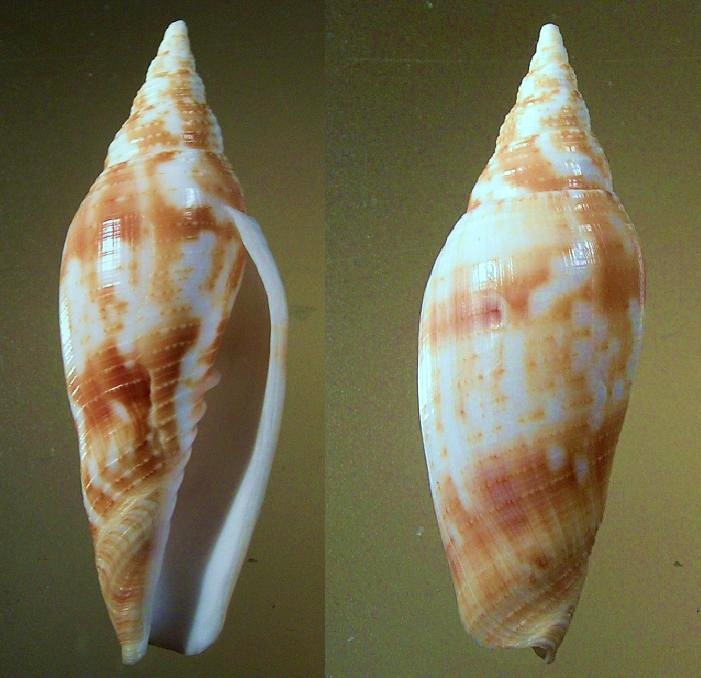
- shell of Pleioptygma helenae

Scientific classification
- Kingdom: Animalia
- Phylum: Mollusca
- Class: Gastropoda
- (unranked): clade Caenogastropoda clade Hypsogastropoda clade Neogastropoda
- Superfamily: Muricoidea
- Family: Pleioptygmatidae
- Genus: Pleioptygma
- Species: P. helenae

Binomial name
- Pleioptygma helenae (Radwin & Bibbey, 1972)

= Pleioptygma helenae =

Pleioptygma helenae Temporal range: Neogene–Recent

Species of gastropod

Pleioptygma helenae is a species of sea snail, a marine gastropod mollusk in the family Pleioptygmatidae.

It is the only known living species in this genus and the only extant species in the family Pleioptygmatidae.

== Distribution ==
Honduras.

The type locality is Gorda Bank, Honduras.

Fossil record from Neogene include southeastern USA.

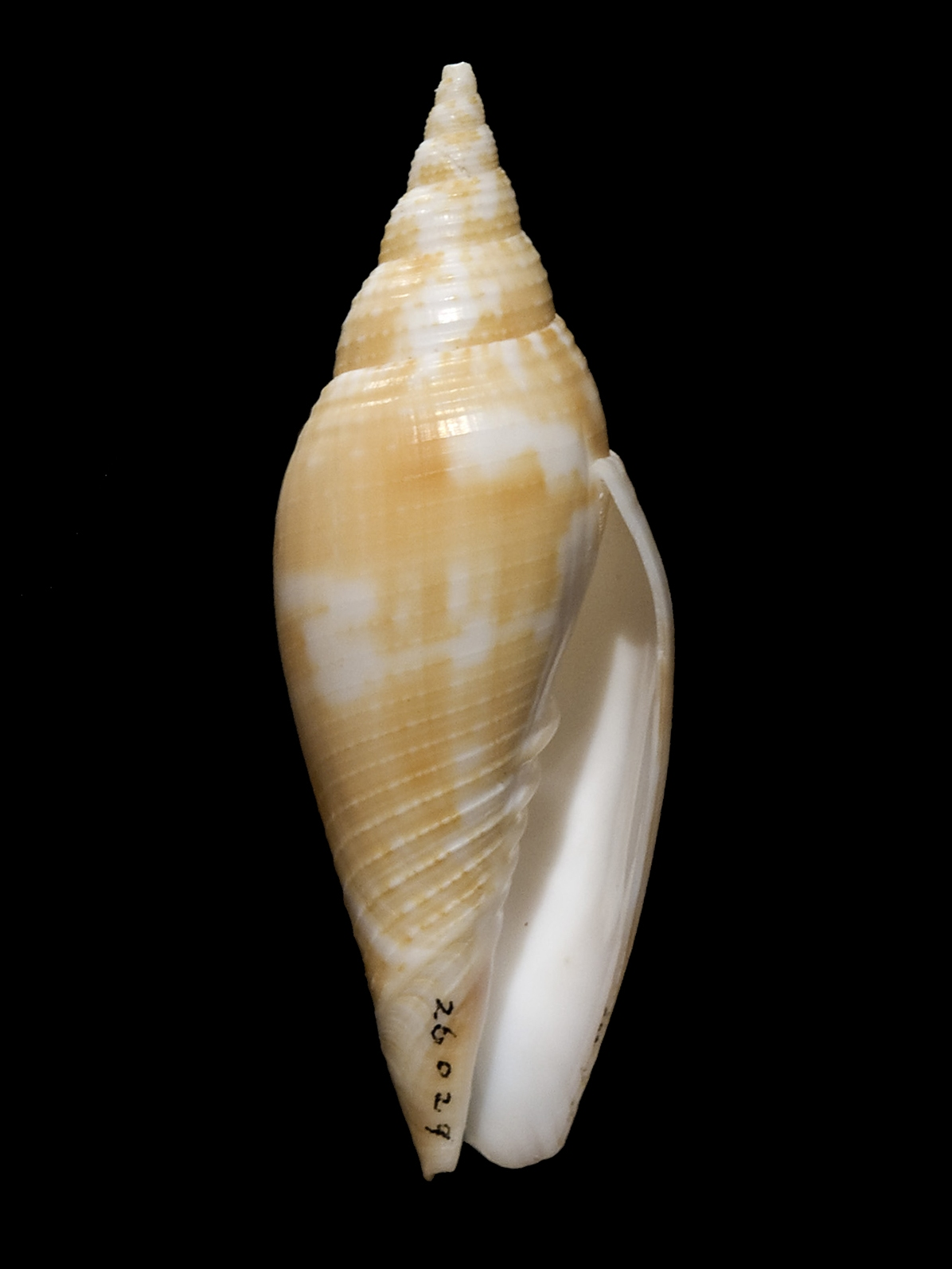
apertural view of the shell of Pleioptygma helenae

== Description ==
The maximum recorded shell length is 123 mm.

The anatomy of the family Pleioptygmatidae is defined according to this the only extant species.

== Habitat ==
Minimum recorded depth is 37 m. Maximum recorded depth is 150 m.
