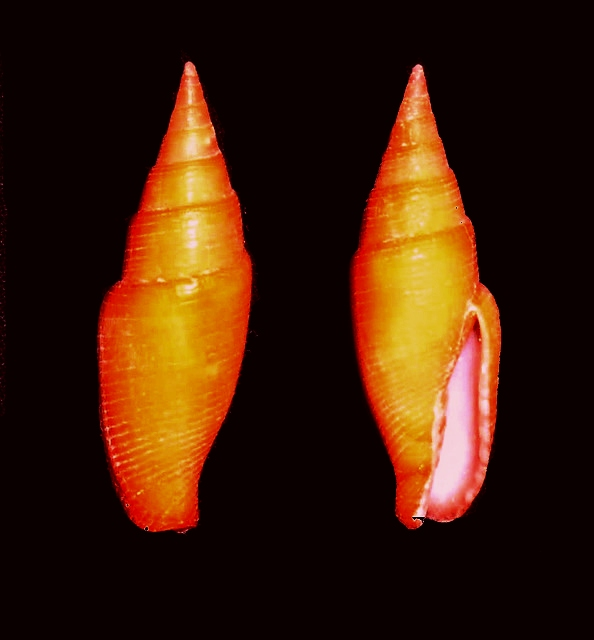

Scientific classification
- Kingdom: Animalia
- Phylum: Mollusca
- Class: Gastropoda
- Subclass: Caenogastropoda
- Order: Neogastropoda
- Family: Mitridae
- Genus: Calcimitra
- Species: C. subflava

Binomial name
- Calcimitra subflava (Kuroda & Habe, 1971)

Synonyms
- Mitra (Mitra) subflava (Kuroda & Habe, 1971); Vicimitra subflava Kuroda & Habe, 1971

= Calcimitra subflava =

Species of gastropod

Calcimitra subflava is a species of sea snail, a marine gastropod mollusk in the family Mitridae, the miters or miter snails.

== Description ==
The shell size varies between 25 mm and 65 mm.

== Distribution ==
This species is distributed in the Pacific Ocean along Japan and the Philippines.
