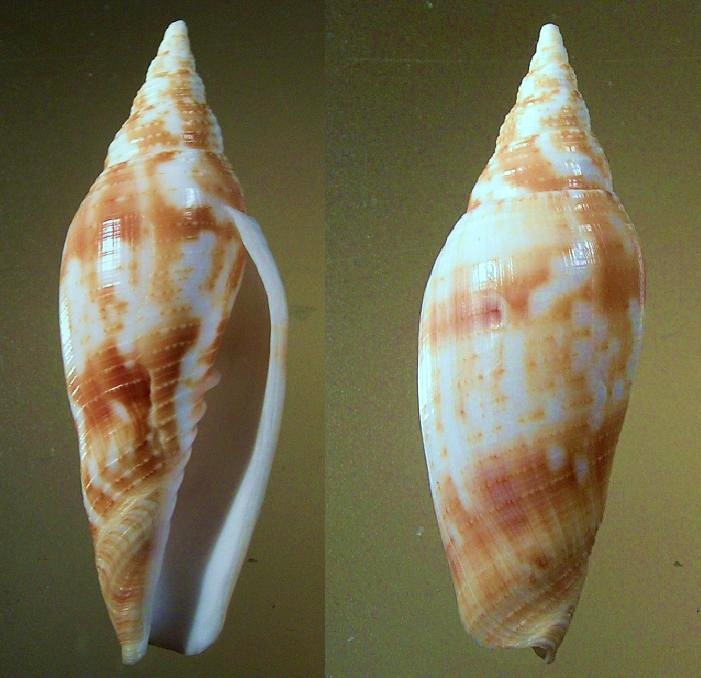
- Two views of a shell of Pleioptygma helenae

Scientific classification
- Kingdom: Animalia
- Phylum: Mollusca
- Class: Gastropoda
- (unranked): clade Caenogastropoda clade Hypsogastropoda clade Neogastropoda
- Superfamily: Muricoidea
- Family: Pleioptygmatidae J. F. Quinn, 1989
- Genus: Pleioptygma Conrad, 1863

= Pleioptygma =

Pleioptygma Temporal range: Miocene–Recent

Genus of sea snails

Pleioptygma is a genus of large sea snails, marine gastropod mollusks in the superfamily Muricoidea.

Pleioptygma is the type genus of the family Pleioptygmatidae and it is the sole genus in the family Pleioptygmatidae.

== Etymology ==
The generic name Pleioptygma is composed from the Greek word "pleios", which means "full" and from the Greek word "ptygma", which means "fold". This is a reference to the numerous folds on the columella of the shell.

== Description ==
In the genus Pleioptygma, the shell is medium to large in size. The shell has mainly spiral sculpture.

The type description of the genus Pleioptygma by Timothy Abbott Conrad (1863) reads as follows:

Subfusiform; aperture long; columella with very oblique plaits, numerous, alternated in size, or irregular, the largest being the second one from above.

Although the shell of these gastropods looks similar to that of mitrids (family Mitridae), they are unrelated enough to require their own family.

The family Pleioptygmatidae has been defined based on the anatomy of the only extant species Pleioptygma helenae: The foot is relatively large in comparison to the size of the shell. Also the snout is relatively large. The foregut (of the digestive system) is different from other families within the Muricoidea. The proboscis is introvert, with a proboscis bulb that has an extreme thick wall. The proboscis bulb is connected directly to the buccal mass. There is no epiproboscis.

== Species ==
Species within the genus Pleioptygma include:

- † Pleioptygma brandyceae Petuch, 1994 - photo of the holotype
- † Pleioptygma carolinense (Conrad, 1840) - type species, from Pliocene. The type species is extinct.
- † Pleioptygma debrae Petuch, 1994 - photo of the holotype
- † Pleioptygma heilprini Cossmann, 1899
- Pleioptygma helenae (Radwin & Bibbey, 1972) - It is the only known living species in this genus.
- † Pleioptygma kissimmeensis Petuch, 1994 - photo of the holotype
- † Pleioptygma limonensis Olsson, 1922
- † Pleioptygma lindae Petuch, 1991
- † Pleioptygma lineolatum lineolatum (Helprin, 1887)
  - † Pleioptygma lineolatum saginatum (Tucker & Wilson, 1933)
- † Pleioptygma nancyae Petuch, 1994 - photo of the holotype
- † Pleioptygma prodroma (Gardner, 1937)
- † Pleioptygma ronaldsmithi Petuch, 1994 - photo of the holotype
- † Pleioptygma swainsonii Broderip, 1836
- † Pleioptygma zaca Strong et al., 1933
