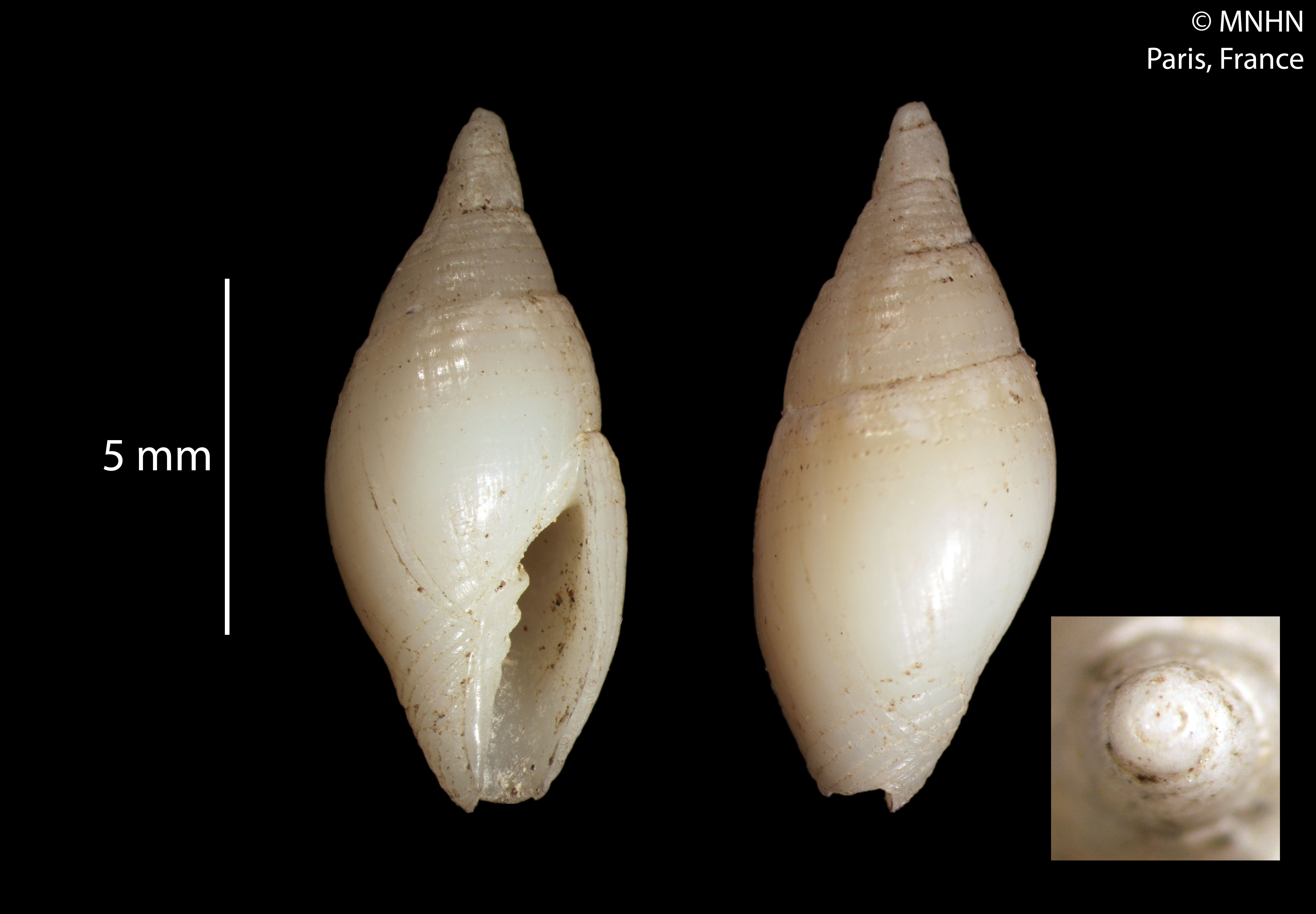
- Shell of Probata espinosai (paratype at MNHN, Paris)

Scientific classification
- Kingdom: Animalia
- Phylum: Mollusca
- Class: Gastropoda
- Subclass: Caenogastropoda
- Order: Neogastropoda
- Superfamily: Mitroidea
- Family: Mitridae
- Genus: Probata; Sarasúa, 1989

Type species
- Mitra espinosai Sarasúa, 1978

Species
- See text

Synonyms
- Mitra (Probata) Sarasúa, 1989

= Probata =

Genus of gastropods

Probata is a genus of sea snails, marine gastropod mollusks in the family Mitridae.

== Species ==
Species within the genus Probata include:

- Probata barbadensis (Gmelin, 1791)
- Probata espinosai (Sarasúa, 1978)
