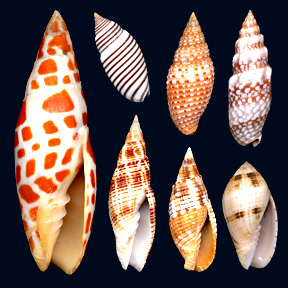
- Shells of a group of different species of mitrids

Scientific classification
- Kingdom: Animalia
- Phylum: Mollusca
- Class: Gastropoda
- Subclass: Caenogastropoda
- Order: Neogastropoda
- Superfamily: Mitroidea
- Family: Mitridae; Swainson, 1831

Genera
- See text

Synonyms
- Pleioptygmatidae Quinn, 1989; Pleioptygmatinae Quinn, 1989· accepted, alternate representation

= Mitridae =

Family of gastropods

Mitridae, known as mitres or mitre shells, are a taxonomic family of sea snails, widely distributed marine gastropod molluscs in the clade Mitroidea.

Both the Latin name and the common name are taken from the item of ecclesiastical headgear, the mitre or miter, used in reference to the elongated and slender shape of the shells.

The dentition of radula in the Mitroidea is rachiglossate, with well-developed central and lateral teeth, both comb-like. Members of this family are predators.

== Distribution ==
These sea snails are found in most warm and temperate seas.

== Subfamilies and genera ==
Subfamilies and genera in the family Mitridae include:

- Cylindromitrinae Cossmann, 1899
  - Nebularia Swainson, 1840
  - Pterygia Röding, 1798
  - †Wormsina Harzhauser & Landau, 2021
- Imbricariinae Troschel, 1867
  - †Austroimbricaria A. M. Olivera & Camacho, 1992
  - Cancilla Swainson, 1840
  - Imbricaria Schumacher, 1817
  - Imbricariopsis Fedosov, Herrmann, Kantor & Bouchet, 2018
  - Neocancilla Cernohorsky, 1970
  - Scabricola Swainson, 1840
  - Swainsonia H. Adams & A. Adams, 1853
- Isarinae Fedosov, Herrmann, Kantor & Bouchet, 2018
  - Isara H. Adams & A. Adams, 1853
  - Subcancilla Olsson & Harbison, 1953
- Mitrinae Swainson, 1829
  - Acromargarita S.-I Huang, 2021
  - Calcimitra Huang, 2011
  - Cancillopsis Fedosov, Herrmann, Kantor & Bouchet, 2018
  - †Dentimitra von Koenen, 1890
  - Domiporta Cernohorsky, 1970
  - Episcomitra Monterosato, 1917
  - Eumitra Tate, 1889
  - †Fraudiziba Harzhauser & Landau, 2021
  - Fusidomiporta Fedosov, Herrmann, Kantor & Bouchet, 2018
  - Gemmulimitra Fedosov, Herrmann, Kantor & Bouchet, 2018
  - Mitra Röding, 1798
  - Neotiara Fedosov, Herrmann, Kantor & Bouchet, 2018
  - Profundimitra Fedosov, Herrmann, Kantor & Bouchet, 2018
  - †Pseudocancilla Staadt in Cossmann, 1913
  - Pseudonebularia Fedosov, Herrmann, Kantor & Bouchet, 2018
  - Quasimitra Fedosov, Herrmann, Kantor & Bouchet, 2018
  - Roseomitra Fedosov, Herrmann, Kantor & Bouchet, 2018
  - Ziba H. Adams & A. Adams, 1853
- Pleioptygmatinae Quinn, 1989
  - Pleioptygma Conrad, 1863
- Strigatellinae Troschel, 1869
  - Strigatella Swainson, 1840
- [unassigned] Mitridae (temporary name)
  - Atrimitra Dall, 1918
  - Carinomitra Fedosov, Herrmann, Kantor & Bouchet, 2018
  - † Clifdenia Laws, 1932
  - Condylomitra Fedosov, Herrmann, Kantor & Bouchet, 2018
  - Dibaphimitra Cernohorsky, 1970
  - † Fusimitra Conrad, 1855
  - Magnamitra Huang & Salisbury, 2017
  - Panamitra E. F. García & R. Salisbury, 2024
  - Probata Sarasúa, 1989
  - Vicimitra Iredale, 1929

Genera brought into synonymy

- Acuticylindra Iredale, 1929: synonym of Pterygia Röding, 1798
- Chrysame H. Adams & A. Adams, 1853: synonym of Strigatella Swainson, 1840
- Conoelix Swainson, 1821: synonym of Imbricaria Schumacher, 1817
- Cylindra Schumacher, 1817: synonym of Pterygia Röding, 1798
- Cylindromitra P. Fischer, 1884: synonym of Pterygia Röding, 1798
- † Diplomitra Finlay, 1926: synonym of Eumitra Tate, 1889
- Mauritia H. Adams, 1869: synonym of Nebularia Swainson, 1840
- Mitroidea Pease, 1865: synonym of Nebularia Swainson, 1840
- Mitrella Swainson, 1831: synonym of Swainsonia H. Adams & A. Adams, 1853
- Mutyca H. Adams & A. Adams, 1853: synonym of Nebularia Swainson, 1840
- Tiarella Swainson, 1840: synonym of Mitra Lamarck, 1798
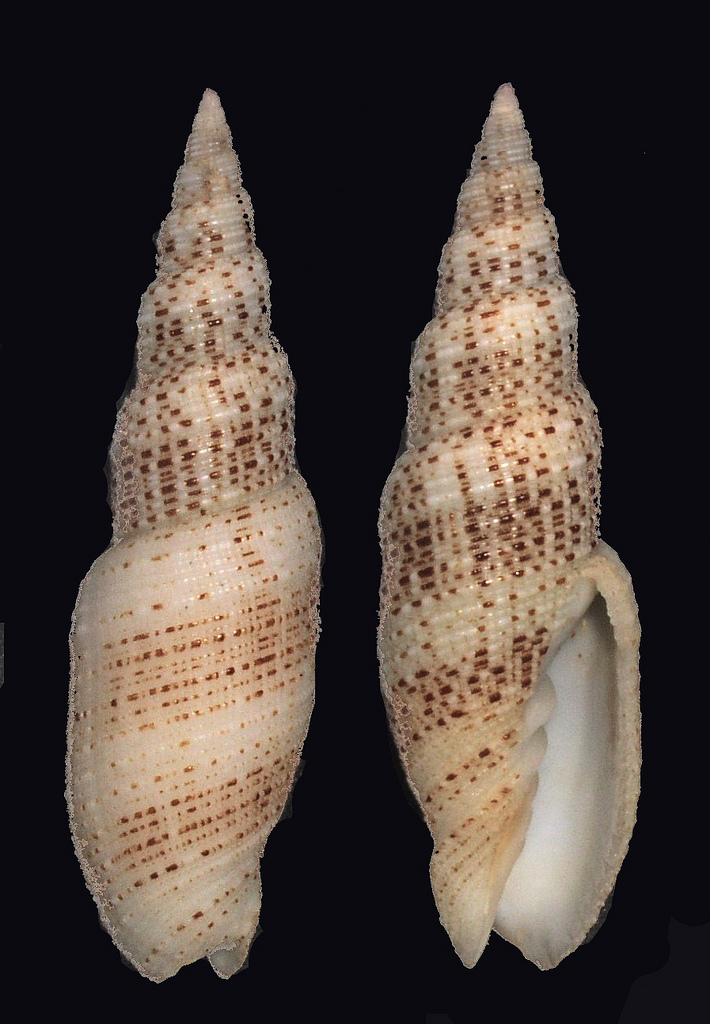
Cancilla gloriola

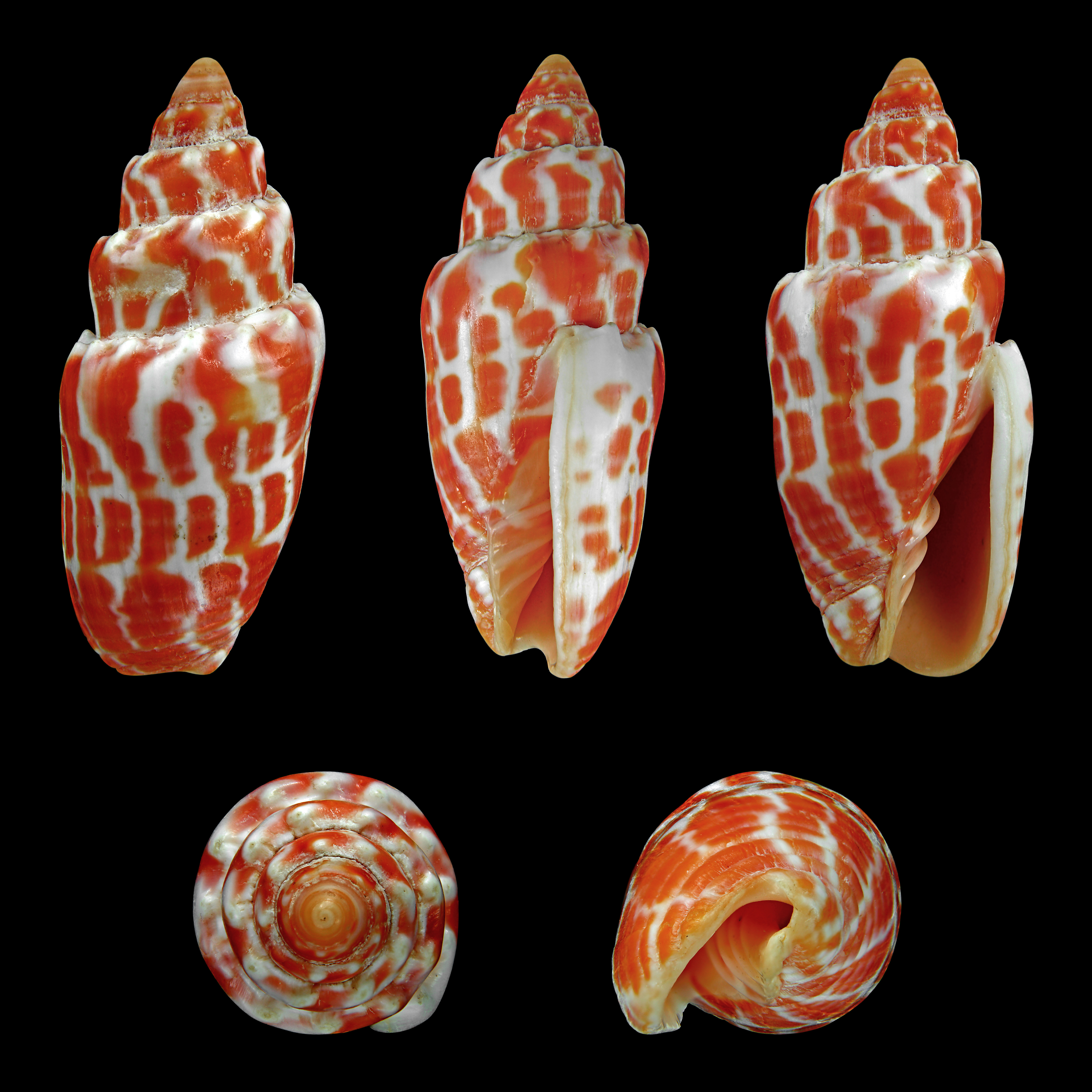
Mitra stictica

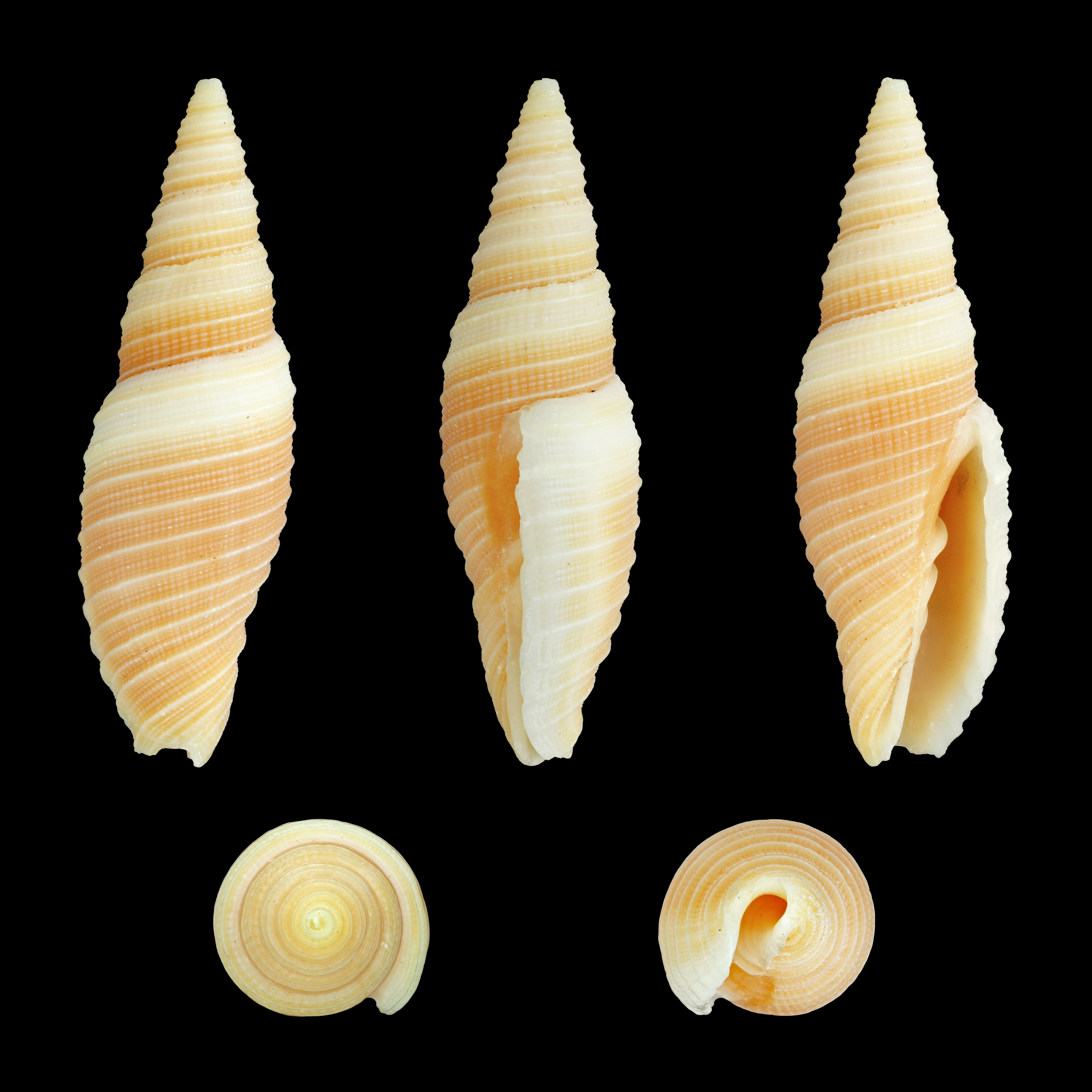
Neocancilla circula

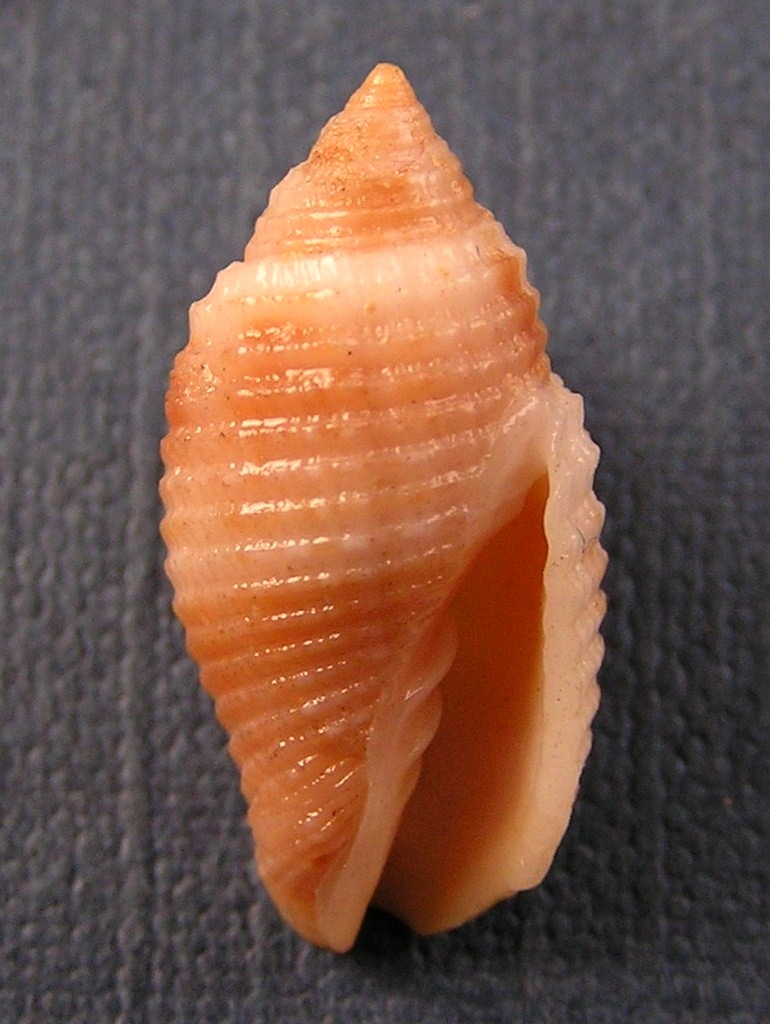
Pterygia scabricula

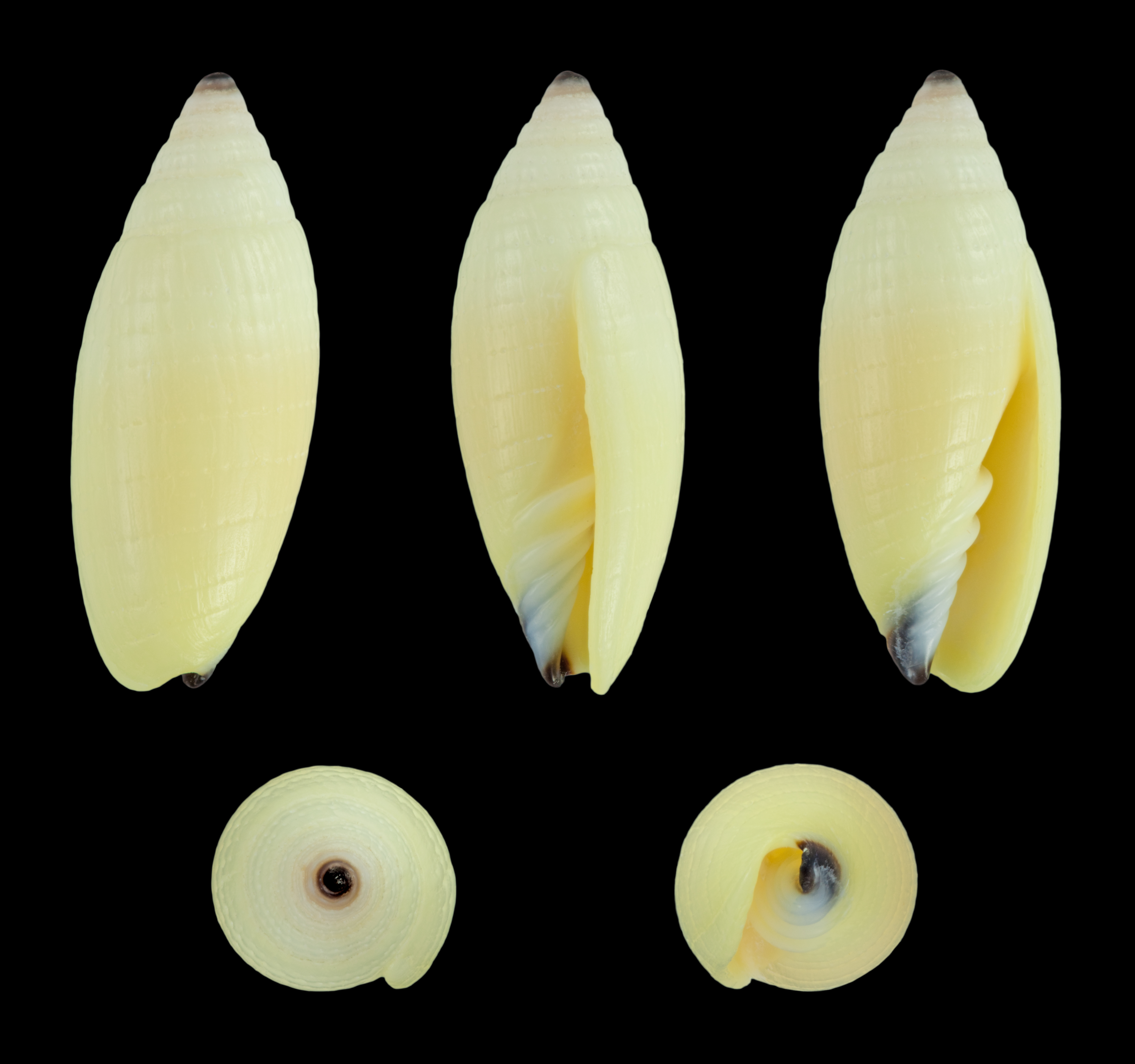
Scabricola olivaeformis

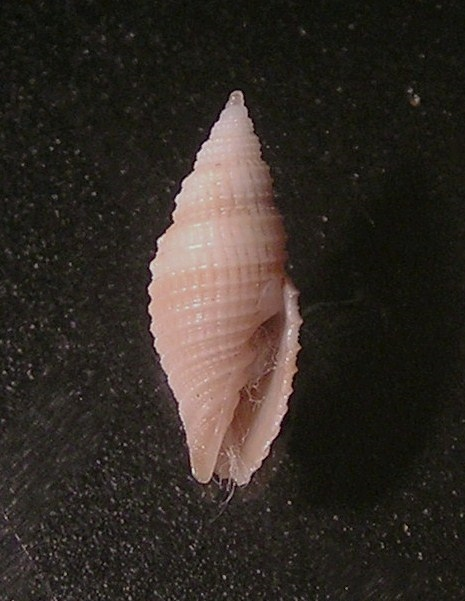
Scabricola padangensis

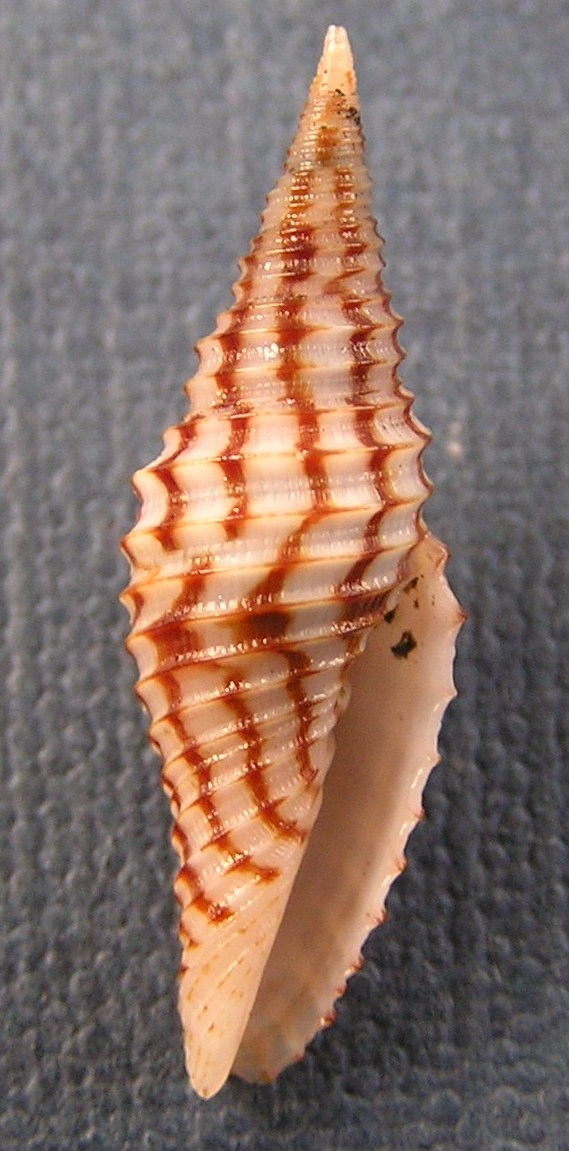
Subcancilla hrdlickai

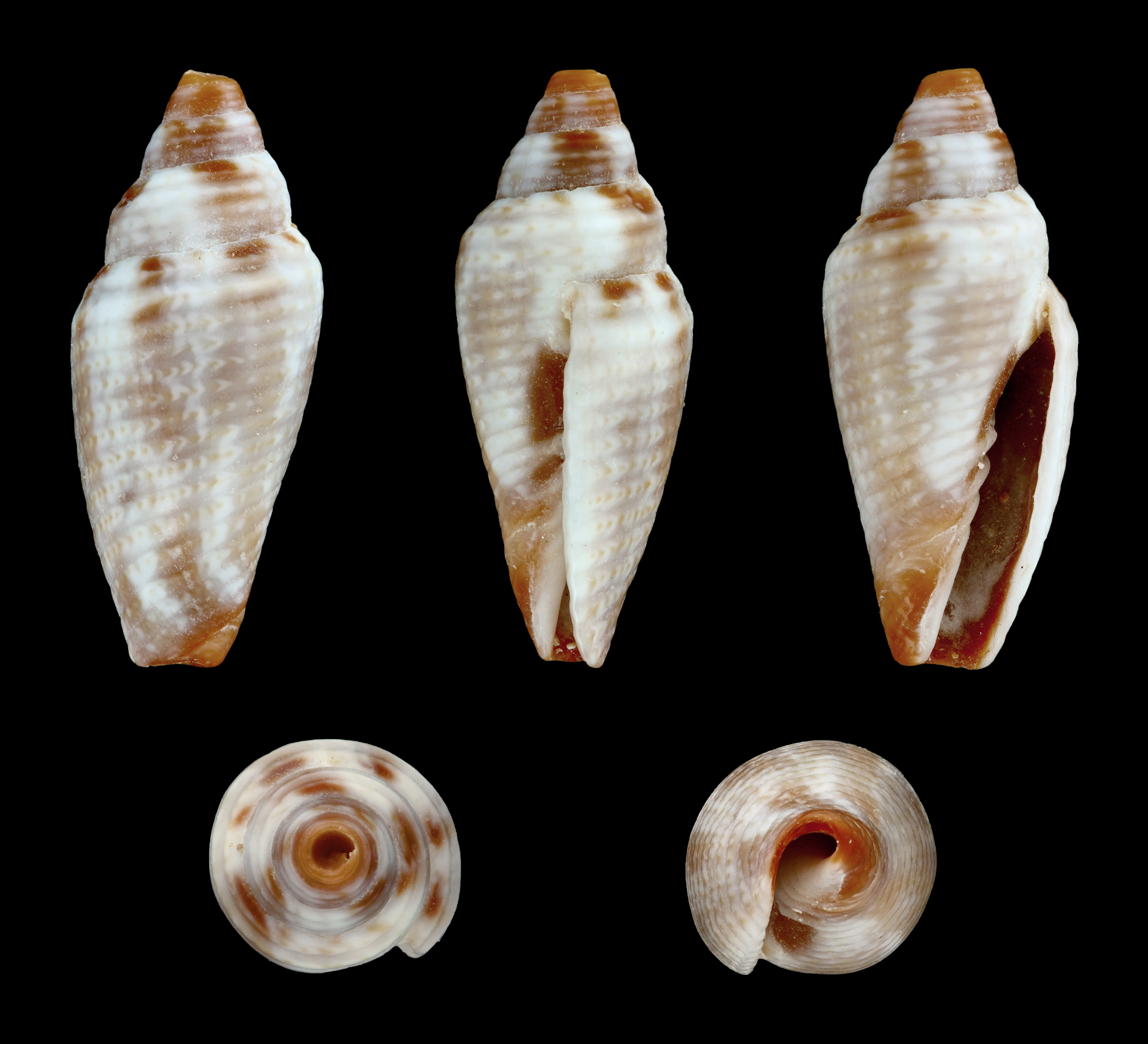
Ziba bacillum
