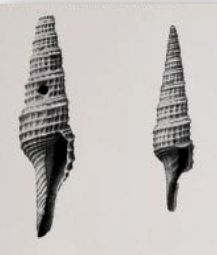
- Shell of Vaughanites leptus (holotype)

Scientific classification
- Kingdom: Animalia
- Phylum: Mollusca
- Class: Gastropoda
- Subclass: Caenogastropoda
- Order: Neogastropoda
- Superfamily: Mitroidea
- Family: Pyramimitridae
- Genus: Vaughanites
- Species: †V. leptus

Binomial name
- †Vaughanites leptus Woodring, 1928

= Vaughanites leptus =

Species of gastropod

Vaughanites leptus is an extinct species of marine gastropod mollusk in the family Pyramimitridae.

== Description ==
Length 17.9 mm.; diameter 4.7 mm. (holotype, apex broken).

(Original description) the outline, nucleus, and aperture as described under the genus. The sculpture consists of an open lattice-work of spiral and axial cords. Five spirals, of which the third from the suture is strongest, lie on penultimate whorl. Spirals overriding axials, but slightly swollen at intersections. Axials bent at strong spiral marking apex of anal notch.

== Distribution ==
Fossils of this marine species have been found in Pliocene strata of Jamaica (age range:3.6 to 2.588 Ma)
