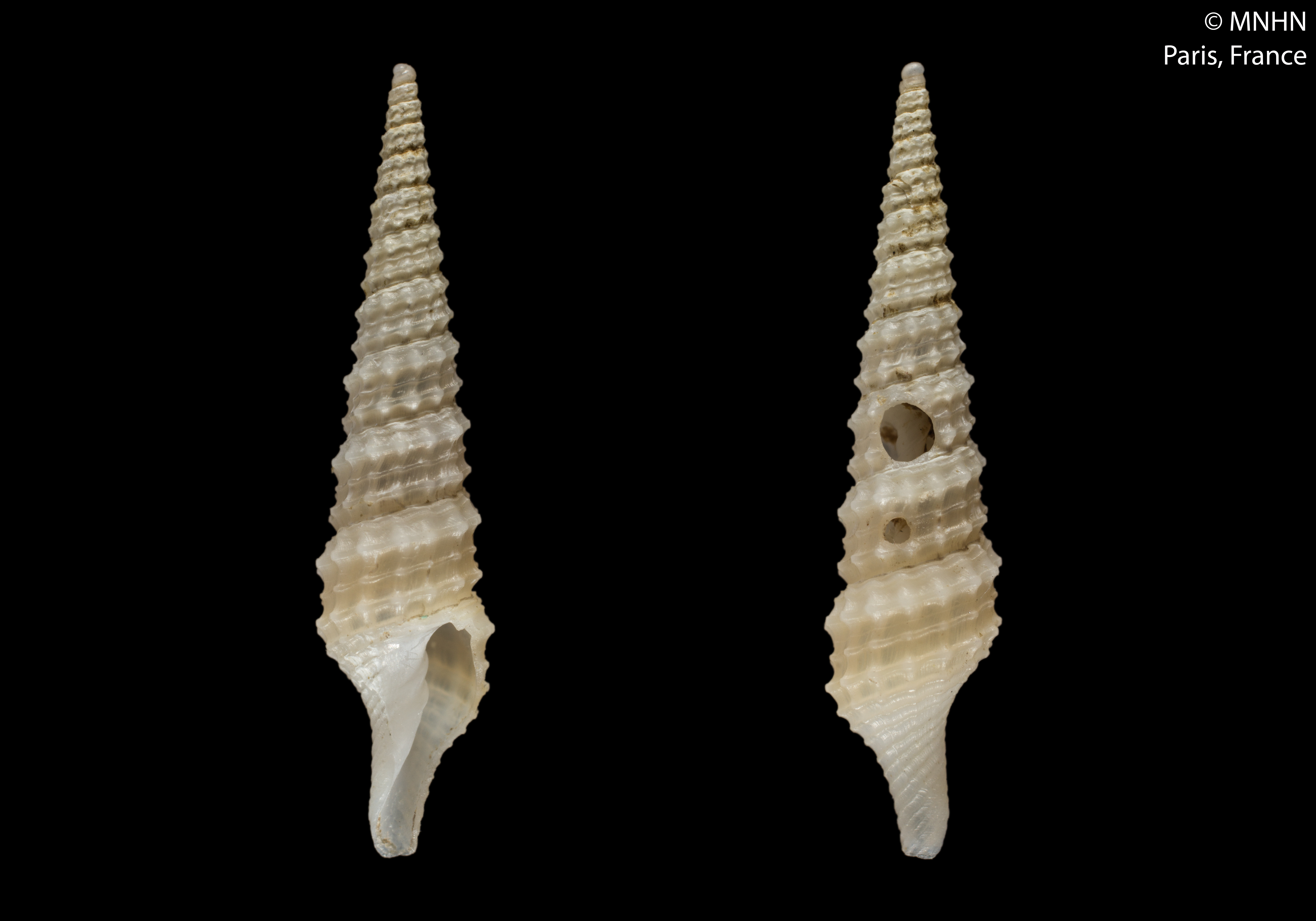
- Shell of Vaughanites superstes (holotype at MNHN, Paris)

Scientific classification
- Kingdom: Animalia
- Phylum: Mollusca
- Class: Gastropoda
- Subclass: Caenogastropoda
- Order: Neogastropoda
- Superfamily: Mitroidea
- Family: Pyramimitridae
- Genus: Vaughanites
- Species: V. superstes

Binomial name
- Vaughanites superstes Kantor, Lozouet, Puillandre & Bouchet, 2014

= Vaughanites superstes =

Species of gastropod

Vaughanites superstes is a species of marine gastropod mollusk in the family Pyramimitridae.

== Description ==
The length of the shell attains 15.7 mm.

== Distribution ==
This marine species occurs off the Philippines.
