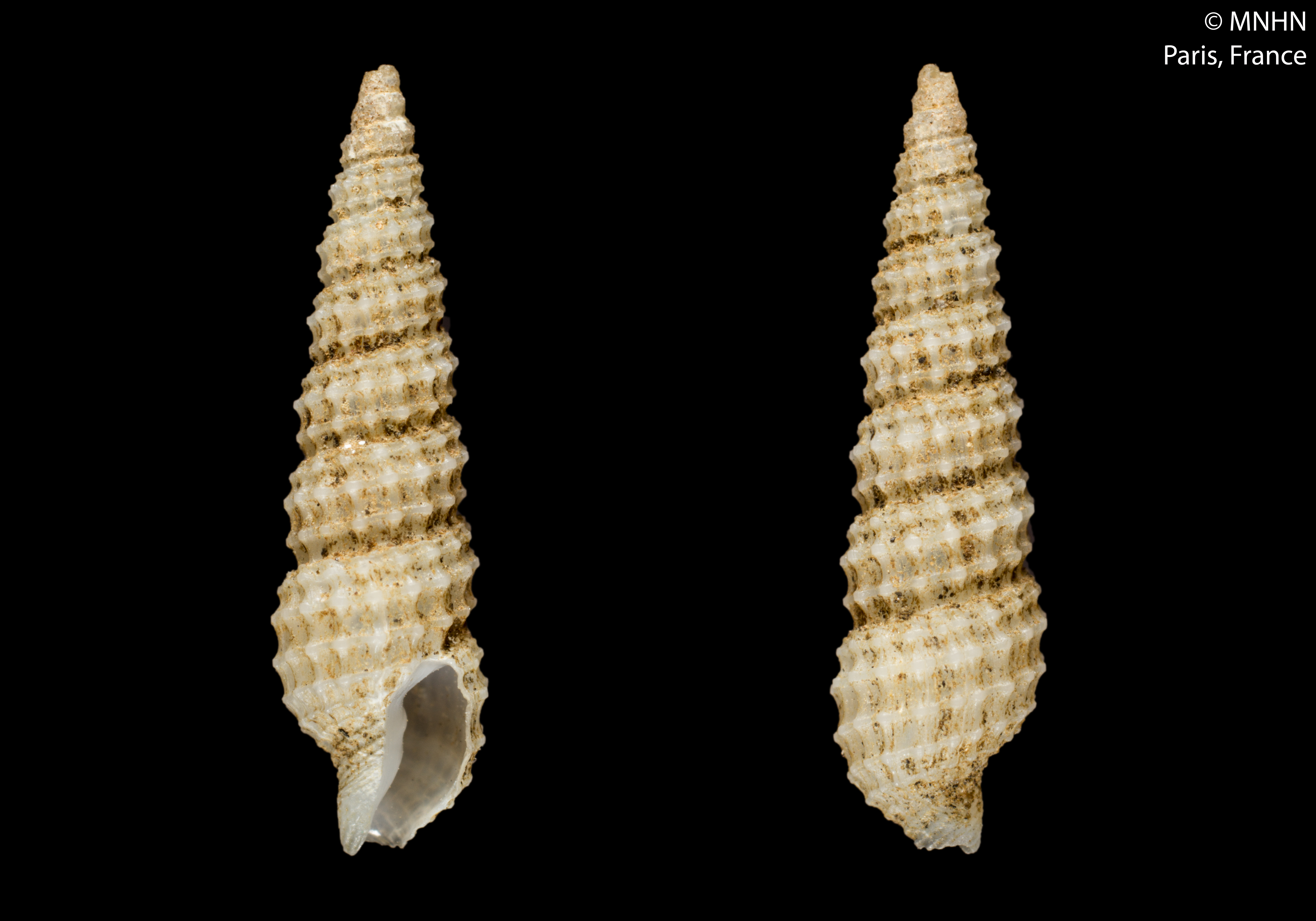
- Shell of Teremitra efatensis (holotype at MNHN, Paris)

Scientific classification
- Kingdom: Animalia
- Phylum: Mollusca
- Class: Gastropoda
- Subclass: Caenogastropoda
- Order: Neogastropoda
- Superfamily: Mitroidea
- Family: Pyramimitridae
- Genus: Teremitra
- Species: T. efatensis

Binomial name
- Teremitra efatensis (Aubry, 1999)

Synonyms
- Terebra efatensis Aubry, 1999 (original combination)

= Teremitra efatensis =

Species of gastropod

Teremitra efatensis is a species of sea snail, a marine gastropod mollusk in the family Pyramimitridae, the mitre snails.

== Description ==
The length of the shell attains 11 mm.

== Distribution ==
This marine species occurs off Vanuatu.
