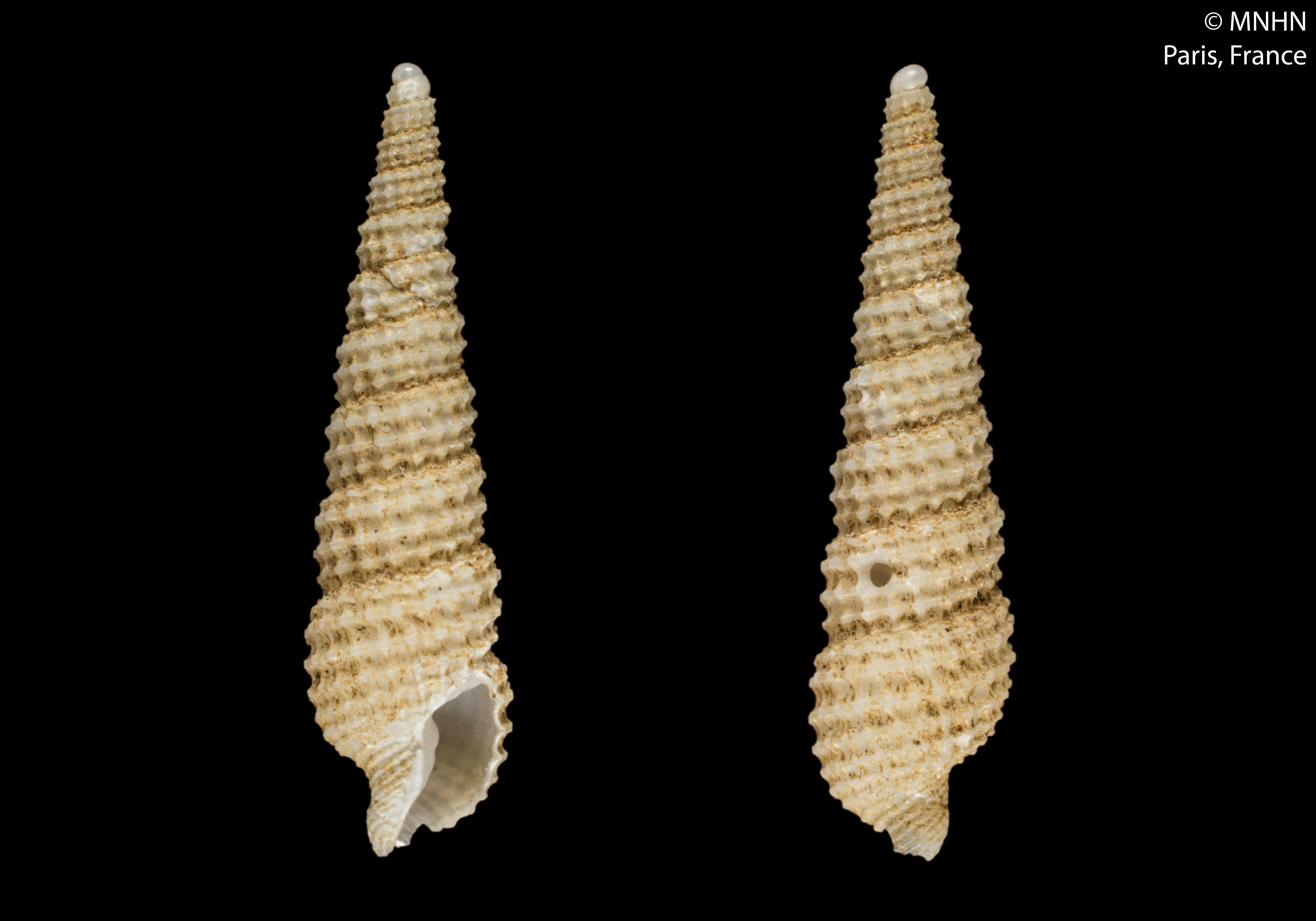
- Shell of Teremitra fallax (holotype at MNHN, Paris)

Scientific classification
- Kingdom: Animalia
- Phylum: Mollusca
- Class: Gastropoda
- Subclass: Caenogastropoda
- Order: Neogastropoda
- Family: Pyramimitridae
- Genus: Teremitra; Kantor, Lozouet, Puillandre & Bouchet, 2014

Type species
- Terebra efatensis Aubry, 1999

Species
- See text

= Teremitra =

Genus of molluscs

Teremitra is a genus of sea snails, marine gastropod molluscs in the family Pyramimitridae, the mitre snails.

== Species ==
Species within the genus Teremitra include:

- Teremitra efatensis (Aubry, 1999)
- Teremitra fallax Kantor, Lozouet, Puillandre & Bouchet, 2014
