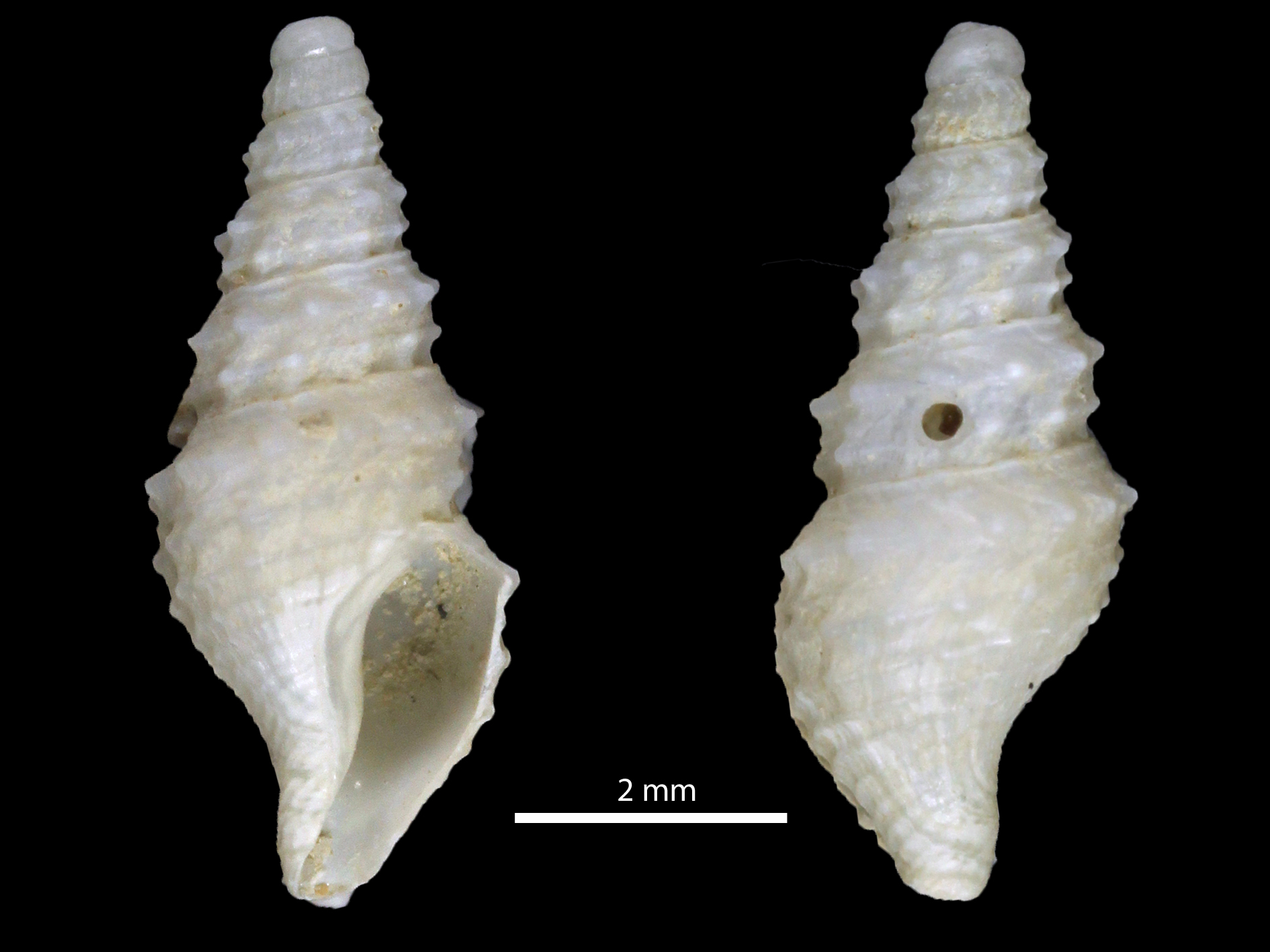

Scientific classification
- Kingdom: Animalia
- Phylum: Mollusca
- Class: Gastropoda
- Subclass: Caenogastropoda
- Order: Neogastropoda
- Superfamily: Mitroidea
- Family: Pyramimitridae
- Genus: Hortia; Lozouet, 1999

Type species
- †Hortia arriuensis Lozouet, 1999

Species
- See text

= Hortia (gastropod) =

Genus of molluscs

Hortia is a genus of sea snails, marine gastropod molluscs in the family Pyramimitridae, the mitre snails.

== Species ==
Species within the genus Hortia include:

- Hortia aotearoa Kantor, Lozouet, Puillandre & Bouchet, 2014
- † Hortia arriuensis Lozouet, 1999
- Hortia macrocephala Kantor, Lozouet, Puillandre & Bouchet, 2014
- Hortia marshalli Kantor, Lozouet, Puillandre & Bouchet, 2014
- Hortia paradrillia Kantor, Lozouet, Puillandre & Bouchet, 2014
- Hortia pseudotaranis Kantor, Lozouet, Puillandre & Bouchet, 2014
- Hortia solitaria Kantor, Lozouet, Puillandre & Bouchet, 2014
- Hortia spenceri Kantor, Lozouet, Puillandre & Bouchet, 2014
