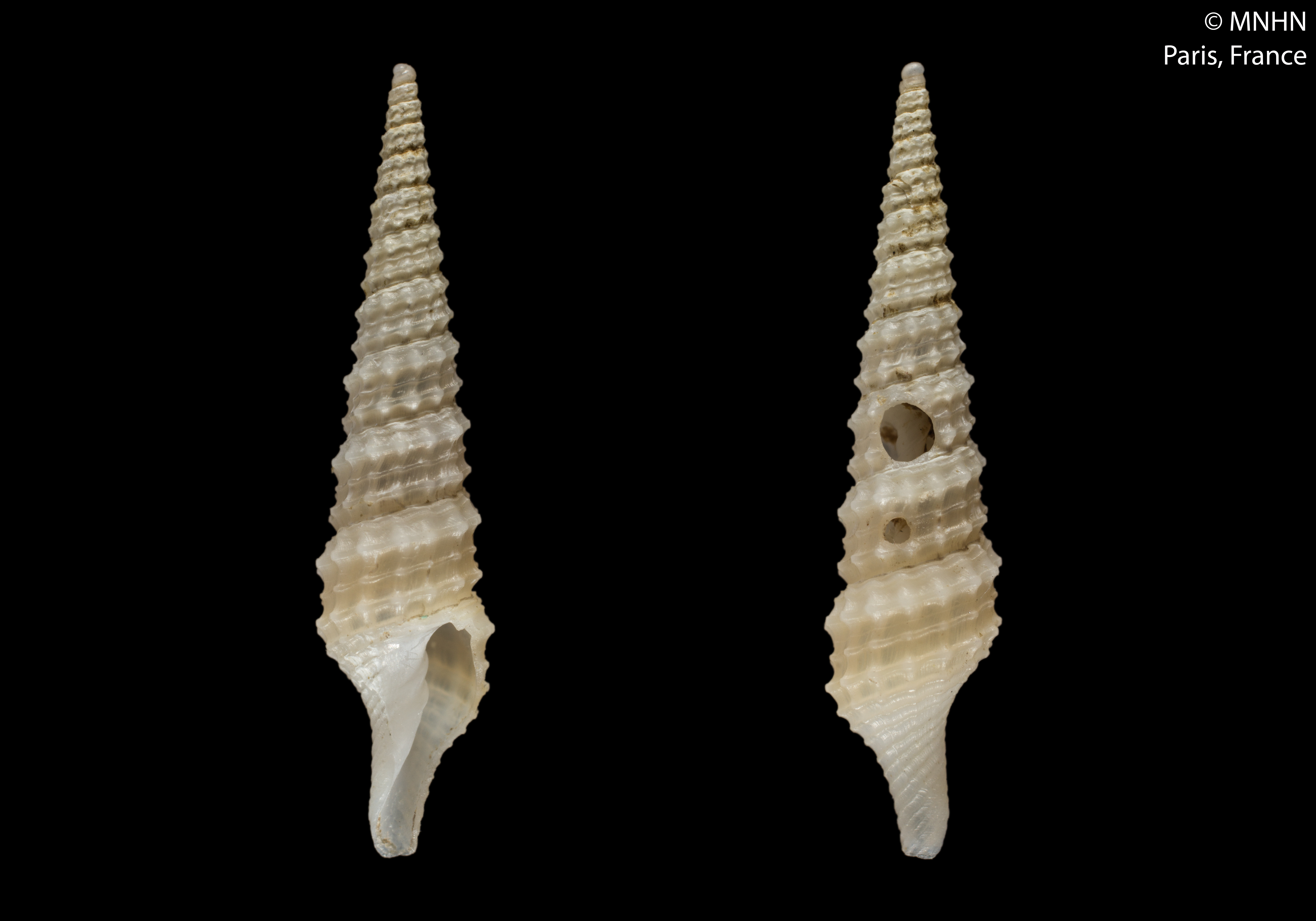
- Shell of Vaughanites superstes

Scientific classification
- Kingdom: Animalia
- Phylum: Mollusca
- Class: Gastropoda
- Subclass: Caenogastropoda
- Order: Neogastropoda
- Superfamily: Mitroidea
- Family: Pyramimitridae
- Genus: Vaughanites; Woodring, 1928

Type species
- † Vaughanites leptus Woodring, 1928

= Vaughanites =

Genus of gastropods

Vaughanites is a genus of predatory sea snails, marine gastropod mollusks in the family Pyramimitridae.

== Species ==
- † Vaughanites leptus Woodring, 1928
- Vaughanites superstes Kantor, Lozouet, Puillandre & Bouchet, 2014

== Description ==
The shell is medium-sized, very slender, Mitra-like. The protoconch consists of between two and three whorls, about the last one sculptured with coarse axial riblets. The aperture is long and narrow. The siphonal canal is very long and narrow, unemarginate. The anal notch, according to growth lines and ribs, is rather wide and shallow, the apex lying on a prominent spiral some distance from suture. The columella bears two strong Mitra-like folds. The sculpture consists of strong axial and spiral cords, forming an open lattice-work.
