= Pyramimitridae =

Scientific classification
- Kingdom: Animalia
- Phylum: Mollusca
- Class: Gastropoda
- Subclass: Caenogastropoda
- Order: Neogastropoda
- Superfamily: Mitroidea
- Family: Pyramimitridae; Cossmann, 1901

Genera
- See text

Family of gastropods

Pyramimitridae, known as mitre shells, are a taxonomic family of sea snails, widely distributed marine gastropod molluscs in the superfamily Mitroidea.

== Genera ==
Genera in the family Pyramimitridae include:

Subfamily Mitristinae S.-I Huang, M.-H. Lin & C.-L. Chen, 2025

- Mitrista S.-I Huang, M.-H. Lin & C.-L. Chen, 2025

Subfamily Pyramimitrinae Cossmann, 1901

- †Endiatoma Cossmann, 1896
- Hortia Lozouet, 1999
- † Pyramimitra Conrad, 1865
- Teremitra Kantor, Lozouet, Puillandre & Bouchet, 2014
- Vaughanites Woodring, 1928
