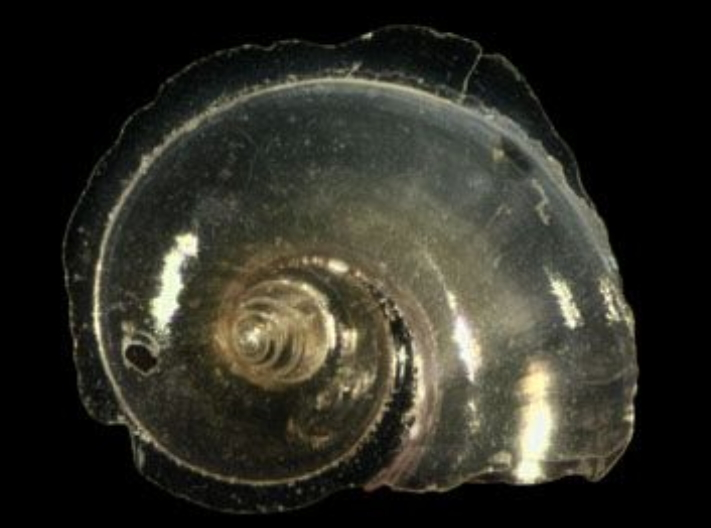
- Atlanta inclinata (specimen at the Natural History Museum Rotterdam)

Scientific classification
- Kingdom: Animalia
- Phylum: Mollusca
- Class: Gastropoda
- Subclass: Caenogastropoda
- Order: Littorinimorpha
- Family: Atlantidae
- Genus: Atlanta
- Species: A. inclinata

Binomial name
- Atlanta inclinata J. E. Gray, 1850

Synonyms
- Atlanta affinis Tesch, 1906; Atlanta aloysiisabaudi Issel, 1907; Atlanta inclinata Souleyet, 1852; Atlanta macrocarinata Bonnevie, 1920 · unaccepted; Atlanta megalope Richter, 1961

= Atlanta inclinata =

Species of gastropod

Atlanta inclinata is a species of sea snail, a holoplanktonic marine gastropod mollusk in the family Atlantidae.

== Description ==
The maximum recorded shell length is 7 mm.

(Described as Atlanta affinis) The new species described here shows a great similarity to Atlanta peronii. Here, too, one finds a keel that reaches as far as the slit in the outer lip and thus fades away before the aperture. The keel penetrates between the whorls here—and quite deeply at that—so that more than half of the penultimate whorl is separated from the body whorl.

The shell is entirely flat and consists of six whorls, the last of which is by far the largest. The spire shows the same shape as in A. peronii but does not stand upright; instead, it is strongly inclined forward. This represents the essential characteristic of the species discussed here. Furthermore, the body whorl shows regular transverse stripes, particularly visible in empty shells, which sometimes give the impression of furrows even if they actually represent thinner parts of the shell between which wide, opaque stripes are situated. The aperture is low and egg-shaped, exactly as in A. peronii, with a deep slit in the outer lip whose edges do not diverge outward.

To a certain extent, this species represents a link between A. peronii, with which it shares the flat shell and the keel reaching deep between the whorls, and Atlanta lesueurii, whose transverse stripes on the shell appear in the same manner, though they also continue onto the spire itself. However, it is sufficiently distinct from both species.

The radula shows, on the whole, the greatest similarity to that of A. peronii. No essential difference is to be noted in the shape of the central plates. The intermediate plates are also structured very similarly, except that the outer spine—as found on the concave outer side of the plate in A. peronii—does not occur in A. affinis. The lateral teeth, which are equal to each other in size, do not reach the length of the intermediate plate at all; such a proportion is, however, quite common in the genus Atlanta.

The largest diameter of the shell in one specimen (an empty shell) was 7 mm; in most cases, however, it reaches 2–4 mm.

== Distribution ==
This marine species is circumglobal.

== Habitat ==
Minimum recorded depth is 0 m. Maximum recorded depth is 150 m.
