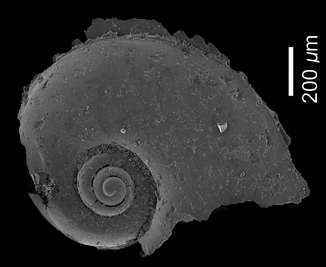
- Apical view of the shell of Atlanta lesueurii from the Pliocene
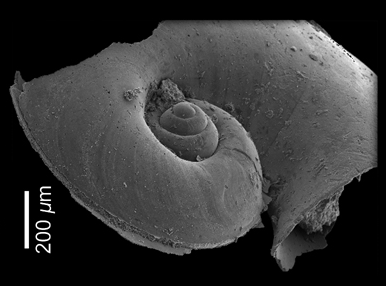
- Oblique apical view of the shell of Atlanta lesueurii

Scientific classification
- Kingdom: Animalia
- Phylum: Mollusca
- Class: Gastropoda
- Subclass: Caenogastropoda
- Order: Littorinimorpha
- Family: Atlantidae
- Genus: Atlanta
- Species: A. lesueurii

Binomial name
- Atlanta lesueurii J. E. Gray, 1850

Synonyms
- Atlanta lesueurii Souleyet, 1852

= Atlanta lesueurii =

Atlanta lesueurii Temporal range: Pliocene-Recent

Species of gastropod

Atlanta lesueurii is a species of sea snail, a holoplanktonic marine gastropod mollusk in the family Atlantidae.

== Description ==
The maximal shell size of Atlanta lesueurii appears to vary geographically (from 2 mm in Hawaiian and eastern Australian waters to 6 mm in the tropical western Pacific). The shell is transparent, thin and fragile, with a smooth surface (lacking raised sculpture). The spire is very small, somewhat elevated and compact, consisting of about 2½ whorls. Spire sutures are deep, with the result that the whorls are somewhat rounded in profile and can easily be distinguished. After metamorphosis the outermost whorl enlarges and inflates rapidly and the keel becomes progressively taller, becoming very tall in large adults and having a truncate leading edge. The keel base and spire sutures are colorless.

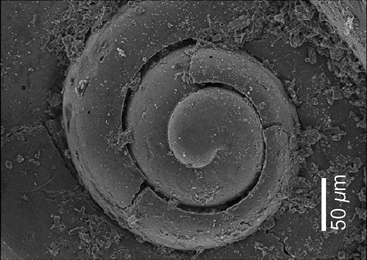
apical view of the detail of the shell of Atlanta lesueurii shows clearly visible protoconch, that has 2¼ whorls

Main features for the recognition of this species are the protoconch composed of just 2¼-3 convex whorls, separated by an incised suture and the absence of any ornament. The first teleoconch whorl expands rapidly and bears a well-developed flange-like keel. In the largest specimens the final three quarters of the teleoconch separates from the penultimate whorl.

Eyes are type b, with a large lens. The Operculum is the type b. Radula is type I, with a narrowly triangular shape.

Atlanta lesueurii is the large species in the genus Atlanta, but Atlanta peronii is larger.

Atlanta lesueurii resembles closely Atlanta oligogyra, in which, however, the first whorls are separated by a superficial suture and the shell remains much smaller.

Overview of description:

- Maximal shell size appears to vary geographically, between 2 and 6 mm
- Shell transparent with a thin, fragile walls
- Shell surface smooth; lacking surface sculpture
- Spire compact, consisting of about 2½ whorls
- Spire sutures incised, enabling distinction of whorls
- Keel tall, with a truncate leading edge
- Eyes type b; lens large
- Operculum type b
- Radula type I, narrowly triangular shape

== Distribution ==
Atlanta lesueuri has a Recent circumglobal tropical/subtropical distribution.

The first fossil specimens of Atlanta lesueurii has been found from Pliocene in Tiep, Roxas (map) and Anda, Pangasinan, Luzon, Philippines in 2001 (published in 2007).

== Ecology ==
Vertical distribution in Hawaiian waters is restricted to upper 150 m, with most individuals in the upper 100 m and some evidence for nocturnal migration into the upper 50 m.

=== Vertical migration ===
Diel vertical distribution patterns of Atlanta lesueurii (among the 13 species of heteropods in the study) were investigated off leeward Oahu, Hawaii in waters overlying a bottom depth of 2,000 m (between 9 and 11 km off the coast) by Seapy (1990). Heteropods were collected during day and night periods using paired, opening-closing BONGO nets at 50-m depth intervals between the surface and 200 m and at 200–300 m and 300–400 m. Three or four replicated tows were taken in each depth interval. Atlanta lesueurii was found to be the most abundant species, with a maximal density of 59 individuals per 1,000 m^{3} in a daytime 0–45 m depth interval. The species ranged from the surface to 140 m during both day and night periods. There was an apparent partial populational migration from a depth interval of 45–90 m during the day to 0–45 m at night. However, high variability in densities between the replicated tows in each of the depth intervals resulted in statistically non-significant differences between day and night periods for each of the depth intervals.

In a subsequent study off leeward Oahu (Seapy, 2008), duplicate tows were taken with a MOCNESS multiple, opening-closing net system during day and night periods at three stations located 1, 5 and 15 nm off the island in fall and spring sampling periods. Mean densities were computed (as numbers of individuals beneath 100 m^{2} of ocean surface) during day and night periods at each station. As in the 1990 study, Atlanta lesueurii was the most abundant species in the fall, although it was a close second to Atlanta plana in the spring. Comparisons were made using the nighttime density data to avoid issues such as daytime net avoidance and to include increased nighttime abundances resulting from possible nocturnal vertical migrator species. Atlanta lesueurii was found to be most abundant at the offshore (15 nm) station during both seasons. Offshore to inshore abundance decreased most dramatically in the fall; from mean nighttime densities of 480 (15 nm) to 124 (5 nm) to 37 (1 nm) individuals beneath 100 m^{2} of ocean surface. At the 15 nm station the species ranged downward to the greatest depths; to the 120–160 m depth interval in the spring and to the 80–120 m depth interval in the fall. Clear evidence for nocturnal vertical migration was only seen in the spring at the 1-nm station (10-m depth interval tows were taken in the upper 100 m at this shallow-water station). Highest abundances were recorded between 60 and 30 m during the day to 30 m to the surface at night.
