= Atlanta involuta =

Scientific classification
- Kingdom: Animalia
- Phylum: Mollusca
- Class: Gastropoda
- Subclass: Caenogastropoda
- Order: Littorinimorpha
- Family: Atlantidae
- Genus: Atlanta
- Species: A. involuta

Binomial name
- Atlanta involuta Souleyet, 1852

Species of gastropod

Atlanta involuta is a species of sea snail, a holoplanktonic marine gastropod mollusk in the family Atlantidae.

Atlanta involuta was originally described by Louis François Auguste Souleyet in 1852 based on specimens collected during the Bonite expedition (1836–1837).

== Description ==
The species attains a length of 3 mm.

The name "involuta" (spire bent backward) refers to the most striking feature that separates it from common species like Atlanta peronii or Atlanta inflata. Most species in this genus have a spire that is either perfectly upright or tilted forward, while Atlanta peronii has a large, very visible spire with deep sutures.

(Original description in Latin) The shell is glassy, disc-shaped, broadly keeled, extremely thin, and transparent. The spire is very small, slightly protruding, conical, and bent toward the back. It consists of six convex whorls.

The aperture is ovate-acute (egg-shaped and pointed), slightly reflected (turned back) at the rear, and notched at the front. The peristome (the lip of the shell) is sharp and is interrupted at the back. The operculum is glassy, ovate-acute, thin, and has few whorls.

(Further description originally in French) In this species, the shell is disc-shaped and broadly keeled, composed of six convex whorls. The first five whorls form a small conical protrusion that is directed slightly backward—a characteristic that distinguishes it from previously described species. On the left side, the penultimate whorl also forms a protrusion that indicates the winding of the spire. The aperture is oval-pointed and notched at its front section, with sharp edges that are slightly reflected and separated at the back.

The animal has relatively small eyes and a small snout; the tentacles are elongated, and the fin is of a moderate size. The visceral mass, the edges of the mantle, the mouth, the fin, and the part supporting the operculum are a violet color; the other parts are a transparent white.

This consistent violet marking in A. involuta is a helpful diagnostic trait for live or freshly collected specimen.

== Distribution ==
This marine species occurs in the Pacific Ocean.
