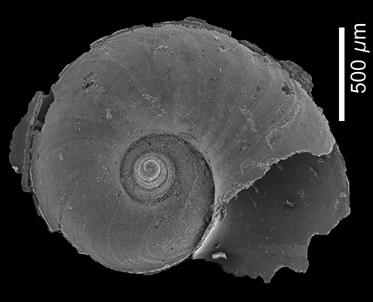
- apical view of the shell of Atlanta brunnea from the Pliocene of Philippines
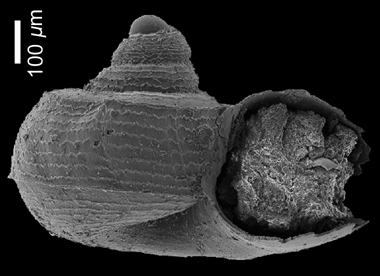
- apertural view of the shell of Atlanta brunnea from the Pliocene of Philippines

Scientific classification
- Kingdom: Animalia
- Phylum: Mollusca
- Class: Gastropoda
- Subclass: Caenogastropoda
- Order: Littorinimorpha
- Family: Atlantidae
- Genus: Atlanta
- Species: A. brunnea

Binomial name
- Atlanta brunnea J. E. Gray, 1850

Synonyms
- Atlanta fusca Souleyet, 1852

= Atlanta brunnea =

Atlanta brunnea Temporal range: Pliocene-Recent

Species of gastropod

Atlanta brunnea is a species of sea snail, a holoplanktonic marine gastropod mollusk in the family Atlantidae.

== Description ==
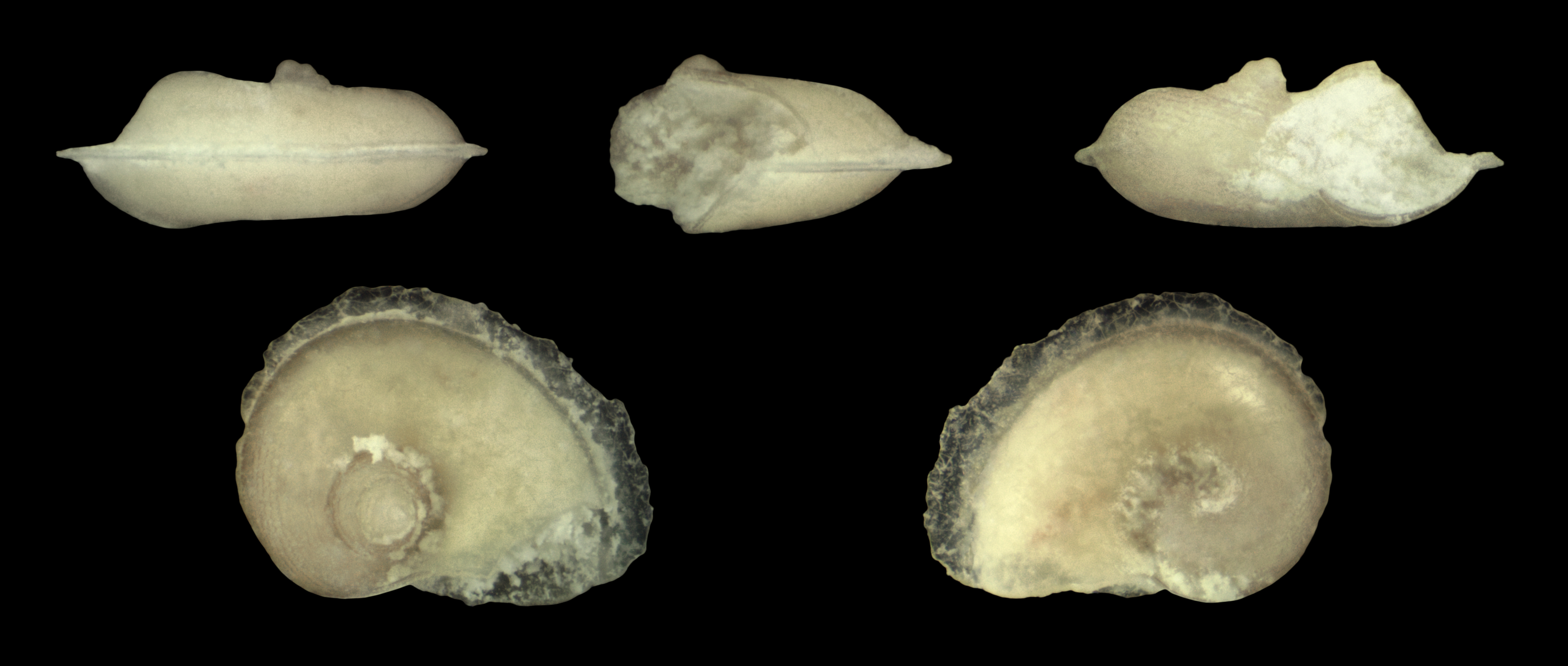

Atlanta brunnea is a small species (shell diameter to 2.0 mm) that is darkly pigmented (brown to reddish-and golden-brown). The keel is tall and colorless, and inserts between the last and penultimate shell whorls in animals larger than 1.5 mm. The spire is tall and conical, consisting of 4 whorls and possessing a complex pattern of spiral sculpture that ends on the protoconch and is replaced by spiral rows of small punctae on the teleoconch. Coloration ranges from brown to amber and reddish brown.

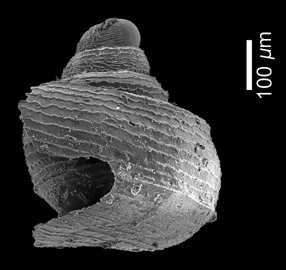
lateral view of the protoconch of Atlanta brunnea

Juveniles of this species are easily recognised by their shape and ornament. The protoconch is rather high conical and has 3½ - 3¾ whorls, slowly increasing in diameter. On the first whorl, in front of the nucleus, an ornament is seen of some nine or ten irregular spirals. Two stronger spirals from the second whorl on delimit a subsutural zone and the base of the shell. On these spirals the whorl profile is slightly angular. The whole surface of the protoconch is furthermore covered with numerous finer spirals in an irregular zigzag shape, also on the base and within the umbilicus. The boundary with the teleoconch is made distinct by the sudden disappearance of these spirals. From that point on the whorl diameter increases rapidly, by which the shape of the shell becomes lenticular. Somewhat more than one teleoconch whorl is present in the largest specimens. The periphery of the body whorl is angular and bears a distinct flange-like keel. The protoconch is visible in an apertural view.

Eyes aretype a, operculum is type a, and radula type I.

Description overview:

- The maximum recorded shell length is 1.7 mm. / Maximal shell diameter is 2.0 mm.
- Keel tall and colorless, and inserts between last and penultimate whorls in shells > 1.5 mm diameter
- Spire tall and conical, with ornate, complex sculpture
- Coloration brown to amber and reddish-brown
- Eyes type a; operculum type a; radula type I

== Distribution ==
Atlanta brunnea has an almost worldwide tropical and subtropical distribution pattern.

=== Fossil distribution ===
Atlanta brunnea is known from the Pliocene of Anda, Pangasinan, Luzon, Philippines.

== Ecology ==
It is limited to the upper 100 m of the water column in Hawaiian waters. Comparison of day and night vertical distribution of abundances suggested that a portion of the population from 50 to 100 m migrated into the upper 50 m at night.
