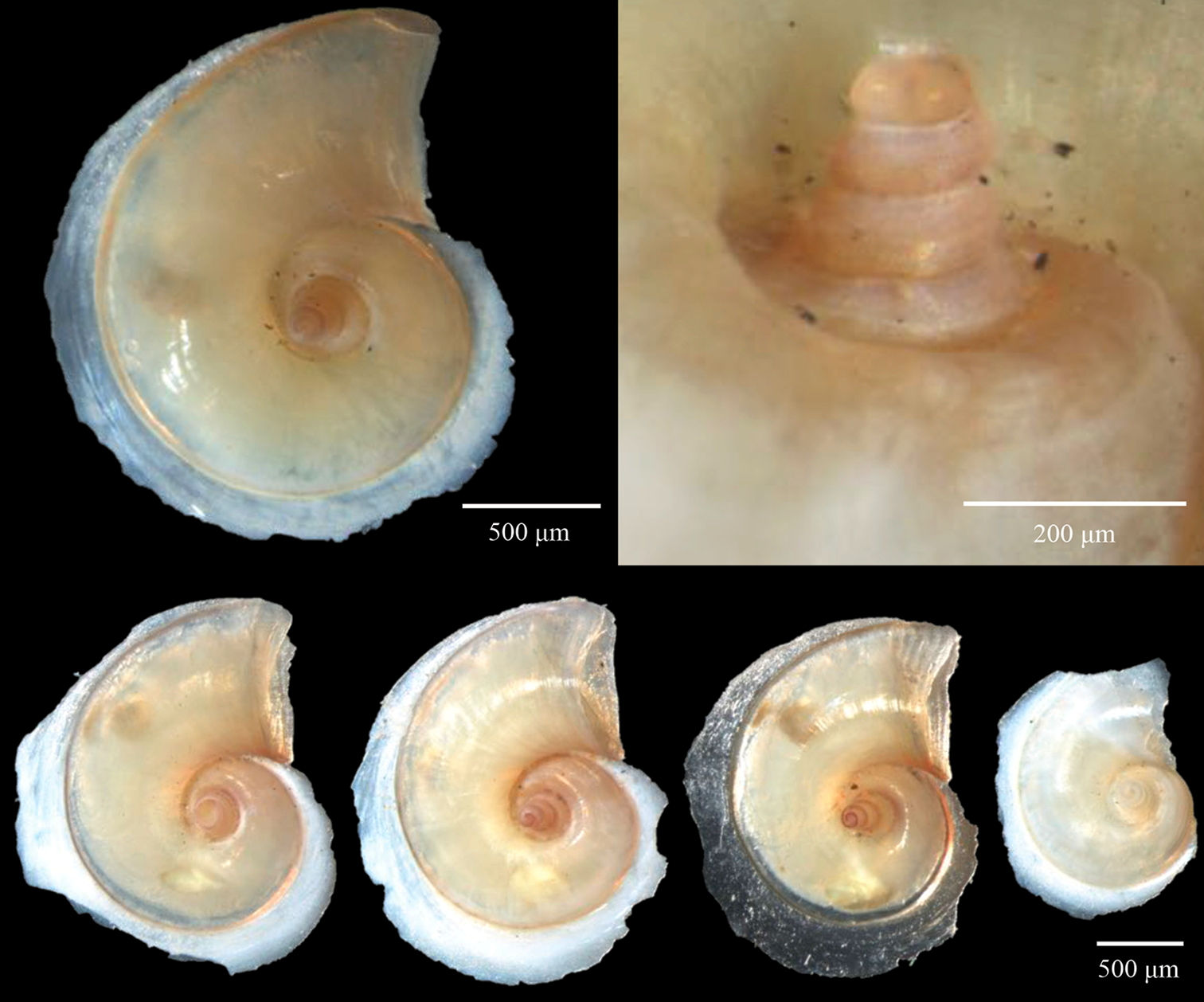
- Shell of Atlanta vanderspoeli (holotype at the Natural History Museum of Denmark, Copenhagen)

Scientific classification
- Kingdom: Animalia
- Phylum: Mollusca
- Class: Gastropoda
- Subclass: Caenogastropoda
- Order: Littorinimorpha
- Family: Atlantidae
- Genus: Atlanta
- Species: A. vanderspoeli

Binomial name
- Atlanta vanderspoeli Wall-Palmer, Hegmann & Peijnenburg, 2019

Synonyms
- Atlanta brunnea Quesquén Liza 2017

= Atlanta vanderspoeli =

Species of gastropod

Atlanta vanderspoeli is a species of sea snail, a holoplanktonic marine gastropod mollusk in the family Atlantidae.

== Description ==
(original description) The shell is small, with fresh specimens exhibiting a color range from brown to pinkish-purple. In adults, the shell diameter averages 1000 μm (excluding the keel). The shell begins to inflate at the transition between the protoconch (larval shell) and the teleoconch (adult shell), typically at 3 1/4 to 4 whorls, reaching a total of 4 3/4 to 5 whorls at maturity. The keel emerges after the fourth whorl; in larger specimens, it inserts between the body whorl and preceding whorls, effectively filling the intervening space. This keel is tall (400 μm), thin, and transparent, gradually tapering toward the aperture after approximately three-quarters of a whorl. The soft tissues—specifically the foot, fin, and sucker—may appear mottled black.

The larval shell (protoconch) measures between 262 and 372 μm in diameter. It is characterized by a high, conical profile and dense surface ornamentation. A prominent carina (ridge) is situated just above the midpoint of the whorl height, which is visible under light microscopy. However, finer details—such as spiral lines and zig-zag patterning—are best observed via Scanning Electron Microscopy (SEM).

== Distribution ==
All specimens were found in the equatorial and south Pacific Ocean from 0.80 N to 29.95 S, and from 127.28 E to 100.00 W
