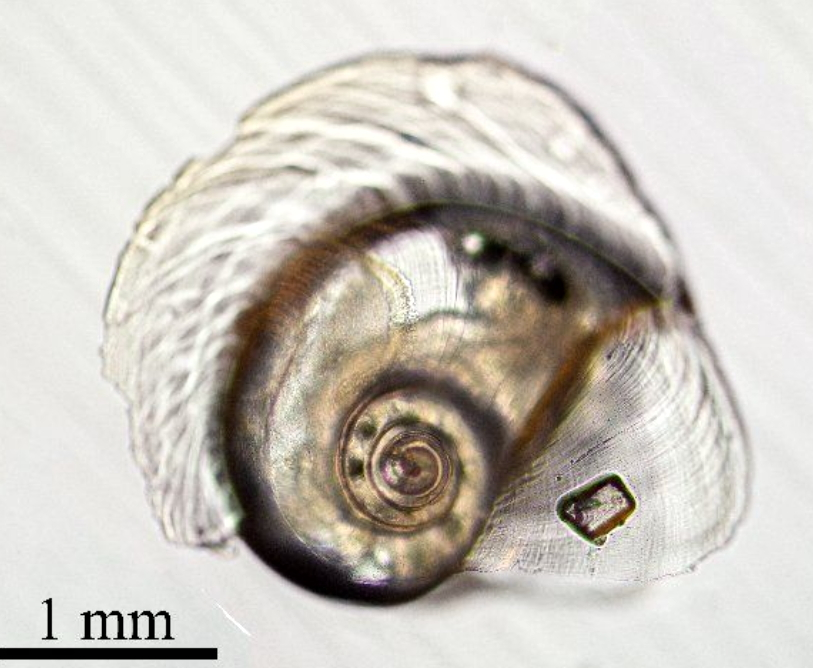
- Atlanta frontieri

Scientific classification
- Kingdom: Animalia
- Phylum: Mollusca
- Class: Gastropoda
- Subclass: Caenogastropoda
- Order: Littorinimorpha
- Family: Atlantidae
- Genus: Atlanta
- Species: A. frontieri

Binomial name
- Atlanta frontieri Richter, 1993

= Atlanta frontieri =

Species of gastropod

Atlanta frontieri is a species of sea snail, a holoplanktonic marine gastropod mollusk in the family Atlantidae.

== Description ==
The maximum recorded shell length is 3 mm.

(Original description in German) Atlanta frontieri possesses a colorless, transparent, medium-sized shell consisting of 6 to 6 1/2 whorls, nearly five of which make up the tightly wound spire. The largest specimens examined have a shell diameter of 5.2 to 5.5 mm with 6 1/3 to 6 1/2 whorls. Only at approximately 5 1/4 whorls does the body whorl detach from the penultimate one in a rapidly widening gap.

In adult shells, the high keel encompasses about 1 1/2 whorls. The umbilicus (the central indentation) is moderately wide and deep. With the exception of the first whorl (protoconch I), the whorls on the upper side of the spire are distinctly flattened; when viewed from the front, the side edges of the spire appear concavely indented.The upper side of the spire bears a very characteristic and distinct spiral sculpture. On the second whorl, a very low spiral ridge runs near the suture, giving this whorl a somewhat "shouldered" appearance. Starting with the third whorl, a high, thin spiral ridge (approx. 20 μm high) begins at the suture between it and the second whorl; this ridge usually continues onto the fourth whorl, where it then ends outside the suture. This ridge, combined with the concave side edges of the spire and the flattened, tightly coiled upper whorls, gives the inner shell of A. frontieri an unmistakable appearance.

The eyes and operculum resemble those of other species in this group. The eye lenses are of normal size (no more than half as large as those of A. fragilis).

The radula (the tooth-bearing tongue) also resembles those of A. peronii and A. fragilis in all essential features, including its moderately distinct sexual dimorphism. Noteworthy differences exist in the shape of the lateral teeth, which in this species are even higher and more laterally compressed than in previously studied species. Accordingly, the individual transverse rows are higher, and their number is lower. With 44 to 50 (average 47) transverse rows in the adult radula, A. frontieri has the lowest row count of all known Atlanta species.

== Distribution ==
According to current knowledge, A. frontieri is restricted to the Indian Ocean and the Western Pacific, though such data remain highly uncertain. In any case, the species appears to be absent off the coast of California and in the waters around Hawaii.

== Etymology ==
The naming is in honor of S. Frontier, who was the first to recognize and describe the decisive characteristics of the species.

== Habitat ==
Minimum recorded depth is 30 m. Maximum recorded depth is 250 m.
