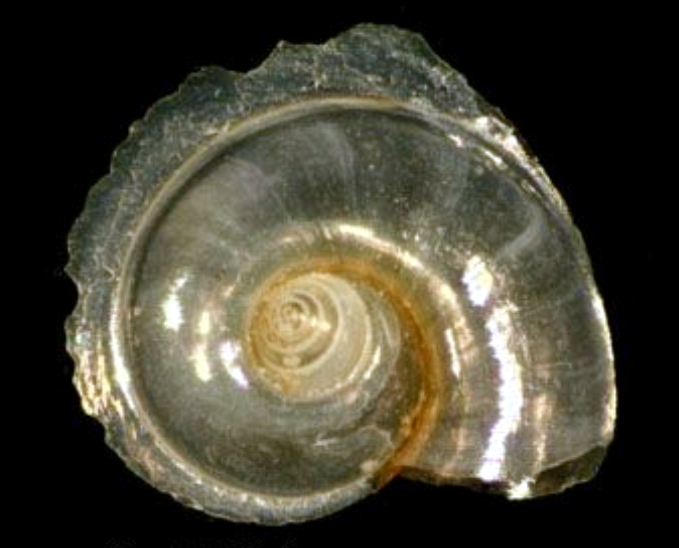
- Atlanta tokiokai (specimen at the Natural History Museum Rotterdam)

Scientific classification
- Kingdom: Animalia
- Phylum: Mollusca
- Class: Gastropoda
- Subclass: Caenogastropoda
- Order: Littorinimorpha
- Family: Atlantidae
- Genus: Atlanta
- Species: A. tokiokai

Binomial name
- Atlanta tokiokai van der Spoel and Troost, 1972

Synonyms
- Protatlanta souleyeti Tokioka, 1961

= Atlanta tokiokai =

Species of gastropod

Atlanta tokiokai is a species of sea snail, a holoplanktonic marine gastropod mollusk in the family Atlantidae. This heteropod derives its species name from the scientist who was the first to draw attention to it in 1961: Dr Takasi Tokioka.

== Description ==
The diameter of the shell ranges between 2.5 and 3.0 mm and its length is typically 1.8 mm with a maximum of 0.5cm. A. tokiokai typically possesses a light yellowish-brown shell with a brown outer lip. Its spire in globose in shape and consists of about five and a half whorls. The surface of the spire possesses well-developed tubercles arranged in spiral rows.

== Distribution ==
This species occurs in the Caribbean Sea.
