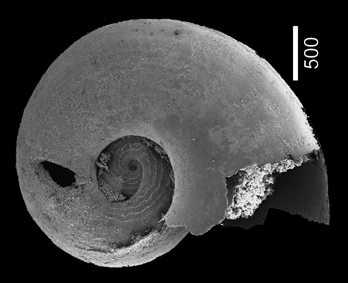
- Apical view of the shell of Oxygyrus keraudrenii from the Pliocene Epoch

Scientific classification
- Kingdom: Animalia
- Phylum: Mollusca
- Class: Gastropoda
- Subclass: Caenogastropoda
- Order: Littorinimorpha
- Family: Atlantidae
- Genus: Oxygyrus; Benson, 1835
- Species: O. keraudrenii

Binomial name
- Oxygyrus keraudrenii (Lesueur, 1817)

= Oxygyrus =

Oxygyrus keraudrenii Temporal range: Pliocene-Recent

Genus of gastropods

Oxygyrus keraudrenii is a species of sea snail, a holoplanktonic marine gastropod mollusk in the family Atlantidae.

Oxygyrus keraudrenii is the only species in the genus Oxygyrus.

== Description ==
Oxygyrus keraudreni (along with Atlanta peronii) attains the largest size (shell diameter to 10 mm) among the Atlantidae. Body coloration is light bluish-purple, with the color darkening with age. The larval shell is calcareous and displays a distinctive pattern of zigzag-shaped spiral ridges that are evenly spaced and cover the shell surface. The teleoconch is composed of conchiolin, a transparent cartilaginous material, and its surface lacks sculpture. With growth the teleoconch overgrows the protoconch and eventually surrounds it. A shell spire, as seen in all other atlantids, is lacking and the spire region is termed involute. The conchiolin keel is glass-like and has a truncate anterior edge that ends at the shell aperture.

The shell of this easily recognisable species is completely involute, with a similar 'umbilicus' at both the top and the base of the shell. This feature makes it impossible to count the number of protoconch whorls, as only one is visible in each of them. The juvenile shell initially is slightly wider than high, but gets relatively wider during growth. Its surface is slightly irregularly covered with approximately 20-24 spiral lirae in a zigzag-shape that usually leave a narrow zone free just below the periphery. In between these lirae the shell's surface is granulated. The apertural margin of the shell is deeply sinuated, as can be seen from the shape of the growth lines and also at the place where the ornamented protoconch changes quite suddenly to the much less clearly ornamented teleoconch (this transition is well-illustrated by Thiriot-Quiévreux, 1973, fig. 1A, and Batten & Dumont, 1976, fig. 24).

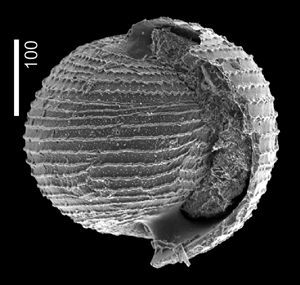
apical view of very small juvenile shell shows typical zigzag-shaped spiral ridges

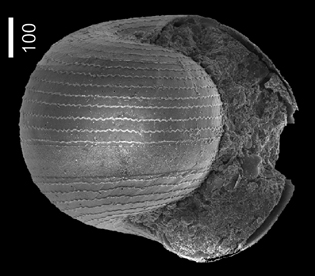
apical view of a juvenile shell

In the largest available specimen from Pliocene of Philippines, the teleoconch has one complete whorl, widening rapidly, which makes the shell about twice as wide as high. In this specimen the apertural margin is irregularly broken, indicating that the teleoconch might even have more than one calcified teleoconch whorl in complete specimens. In another specimen from Philippines (H = 1.60, W = 2.52 mm), the teleoconch has three quarters of a whorl. On the post-larval shell a vague spiral ornament is present and the peripheral belt remains visible as a slightly produced zone reaching the apertural margin.

The type c eye morphology is only seen in one other species of atlantid (Atlanta helicinoides) and one carinariid (Cardiapoda richardi). The shape of the operculum is unique among atlantids, broadly triangular, approaching trapezoidal in shape, and lacking the apical spiral part present in all other atlantids. Also unique to the operculum is that when the animal retracts into its shell, only about one-half of the operculum covers the shell aperture. The radula is very large and is triangular in shape.

Recent specimens of Oxygyrus keraudreni have an uncalcified shell of conchiolin in the adult stage. Janssen (2007) have found an indication that, during the Pliocene, individuals of this species were yet further calcified than are extant specimens. This could point to a developmental trend involving a reduction of calcareous matter in the course of time, as a gradual weight reduction beneficial for holoplanktonic life. The distinct peripheral belt demonstrates that a conchiolin keel was present.

== Distribution ==
The geographical distribution is cosmopolitan in tropical to subtropical waters.

=== Fossil distribution ===
From the fossil record Oxygyrus keraudrenii has been found from Pliocene in Tiep, Roxas (map) and Anda, Pangasinan, Luzon, Philippines in 2001 (published in 2007). Oxygyrus keraudrenii is known, in very few specimens only, from Jamaica (Janssen, 1998) and the Mediterranean Pliocene (Italy, Spain, France; Janssen, 2004). The French occurrence was dated as Zanclean and thus it may be assumed that Oxygyrus occurred approximately since the Miocene-Pliocene transition. Miocene representatives or related forms are unknown.

== Habitat ==
Oxygyrus keraudreni is a shallow-dwelling species that normally occurs in low abundances. In the Indian Ocean was Oxygyrus keraudreni found essentially limited to the upper 100 m of the water column, with 90% between 50 m and the surface. Similarly, off Hawaii was it recorded low in numbers of individuals whose vertical range was limited to the upper 90 m of the water column, with most individuals occurring at night in the upper 45 m. In another study from the same area off Hawaii it was found that Oxygyrus keraudreni was captured in nighttime tows but was either absent or nearly so from comparable daytime ones. The results from the latter two studies suggest the possibility of daytime net avoidance.
