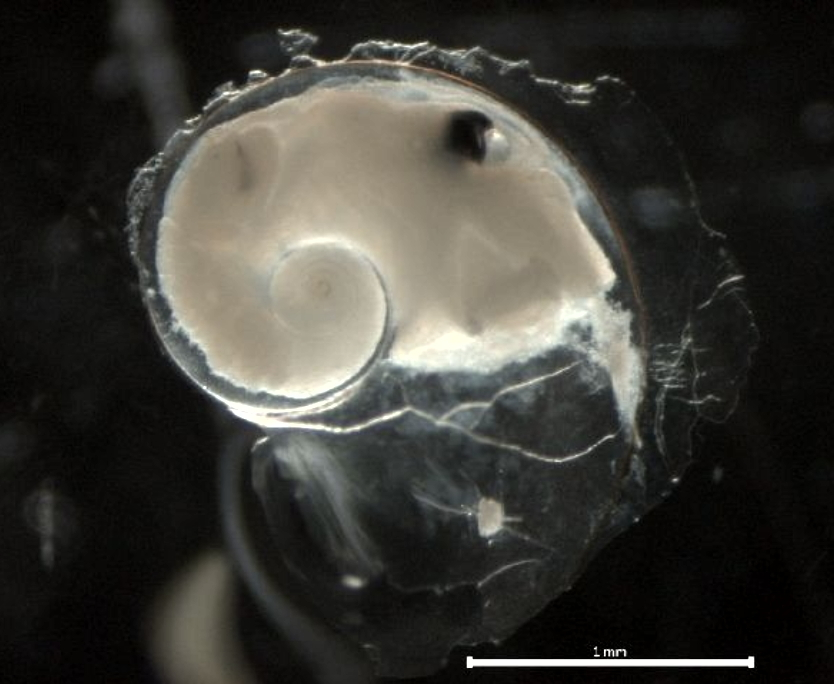
- Atlanta californiensis

Scientific classification
- Kingdom: Animalia
- Phylum: Mollusca
- Class: Gastropoda
- Subclass: Caenogastropoda
- Order: Littorinimorpha
- Family: Atlantidae
- Genus: Atlanta
- Species: A. californiensis

Binomial name
- Atlanta californiensis Seapy & Richter, 1993

= Atlanta californiensis =

Species of gastropod

Atlanta californiensis is a species of sea snail, a holoplanktonic marine gastropodmollusk in the family Atlantidae.

== Description ==
The shell grows to a length of 3.5 mm.

== Distribution ==
This species occurs in the Northern Pacific Ocean.
