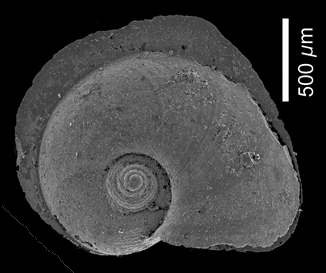
- Apical view of the shell of Atlanta cf. echinogyra from the Pliocene of Philippines. Notice the flange-like keel.

Scientific classification
- Kingdom: Animalia
- Phylum: Mollusca
- Class: Gastropoda
- Subclass: Caenogastropoda
- Order: Littorinimorpha
- Family: Atlantidae
- Genus: Atlanta
- Species: A. echinogyra

Binomial name
- Atlanta echinogyra Richter, 1972

= Atlanta echinogyra =

Atlanta echinogyra Temporal range: Pliocene-Recent

Species of gastropod

Atlanta echinogyra is a species of sea snail, a holoplanktonic marine gastropod mollusk in the family Atlantidae.

== Description ==
Atlanta echinogyra was described in 1972 by Dr. Gotthard Richter (from Senckenberg Museum, Frankfurt am Main, Germany) based on specimens collected during the Meteor Expedition to the northern Indian Ocean. Richter named the species after the unique structure of the opercular gyre, with its raised spiral row of spines.

Atlanta echinogyra is a small species (to 2.5 mm shell diameter). The shell is colorless, although the tissues underlying the shell spire give it a red-violet to red-brown color. The spire is low conical and consists of 3-3.25 whorls. The spire whorls have incised sutures and bear low spiral ridges on the second through most of the fourth whorls. The outer edge of the third and fourth whorls have a raised ridge (seen best in the larval shell). The fourth whorl (first teleoconch whorl) increases rapidly in width and bears a flange-like keel. The keel is moderately elevated with a slightly truncate leading edge. The keel does not insert between the last two shell whorls. The keel base is either clear or brown. The early whorls are covered with a distinct and relatively coarse ornament consisting of four spirals. This ornament is also visible on the base of the shell, where it is present in the umbilicus, on the last part of the protoconch.

Eyes are type a. Operculum is type c, with a gyre that bears a raised spiral row of strong, distally-tapering spines (hence the specific epithet, "echinogyra"). Radula is type I, with unlimited numbers of tooth rows and lacking sexual dimorphism.

Description overview:

- Shell small, with a maximal diameter of 2.5 mm elevated spiral row of outwardly-directed spines that taper distally
- Shell colorless
- Spire region of shell red-violet to red-brown due to underlying tissues
- Spire of 3-3/4 whorls, with low conical shape and deep sutures
- Low spiral ridges present on the second through most of the fourth spire whorls
- Outer edge of third and fourth whorls with a raised ridge
- Keel moderately elevated, with a slightly truncate leading edge
- Keel does not insert between last two whorls
- Keel base clear (North Pacific Ocean) or dark to yellow-brown (northern Indian Ocean)
- Eyes type a
- Operculum type c; gyre bears a raised spiral row of distally-tapering spines
- Radula type I

== Distribution ==
Geographic distribution of Atlanta echinogyra is Indo-Pacific.

In the plankton samples from the Meteor Expedition studied by Richter (1974), Atlanta echinogyra was the fourth most abundant species of heteropod (accounting for 9.1% of the total). By contrast, the species was uncommon off northeastern Australia (ranking ninth, accounting for 1.5% of the total number of heteropods collected) in a study by Seapy et al. (2003). In Hawaiian waters Atlanta echinogyra was variable in its presence and numbers among different collections, ranking eleventh out of thirteen species of atlantids (Seapy, 1990a); from five different sampling periods between 1984 and 1986, it was not collected twice, was represented by a single individual once, and by 27 and 19 individuals in two collections. In eastern Australian waters, Newman (1990) recorded Atlanta echinogyra as rare in northern and central Great Barrier Reef waters. Thus, it would appear that in the Pacific and Indian Oceans, Atlanta echinogyra is only abundant in the northern Indian Ocean.

=== Fossil distribution ===
Atlanta cf. echinogyra is known from the Pliocene of Anda, Pangasinan, Luzon, Philippines.

== Ecology ==
Vertical distribution limited to the upper 100 m in Hawaiian waters.
