= Atlanta pulchella =

Scientific classification
- Kingdom: Animalia
- Phylum: Mollusca
- Class: Gastropoda
- Subclass: Caenogastropoda
- Order: Littorinimorpha
- Family: Atlantidae
- Genus: Atlanta
- Species: A. pulchella

Binomial name
- Atlanta pulchella A. E. Verrill, 1884

Species of gastropod

Atlanta pulchella is a species of sea snail, a holoplanktonic marine gastropod mollusk in the family Atlantidae.

This is a taxon inquirendum.

== Description ==
(Original description) The shell is minute, consisting of approximately four whorls. It is exceedingly thin, transparent, and lustrous. The structure is compressed and features a relatively high, paper-thin keel that begins just behind the aperture’s notch and extends around more than half the circumference of the body whorl. The spire is small, only slightly oblique, and minimally elevated, with its apex positioned level with the top of the body whorl. The suture of the body whorl is well-defined. On the underside, the umbilicus is small, revealing only about one and a half whorls within its cavity.

While the extreme apex is smooth, the succeeding two or three whorls are marked by four or five distinct revolving lines; these ornaments gradually fade as they reach the penultimate whorl. The body whorl, which constitutes the bulk of the shell, is slightly inflated on the ventral side, with gently convex sides and a compressed dorsal section. Its surface is highly polished and marked by faint growth lines, occasionally exhibiting microscopic spiral lines on the left side. The aperture is narrow and ovate—tapering to a point above and rounded below—while the notch is quite wide and of moderate depth.

The shell is a transparent white, accented by a faint, chestnut-brown line following the suture.

The characteristic "chestnut-brown" sutural line is a key landmark for identification. The "revolving lines" on the early whorls suggest a specific developmental pattern that helps distinguish it from "smooth" species.

== Distribution ==
This species occurs in the Atlantic Ocean
