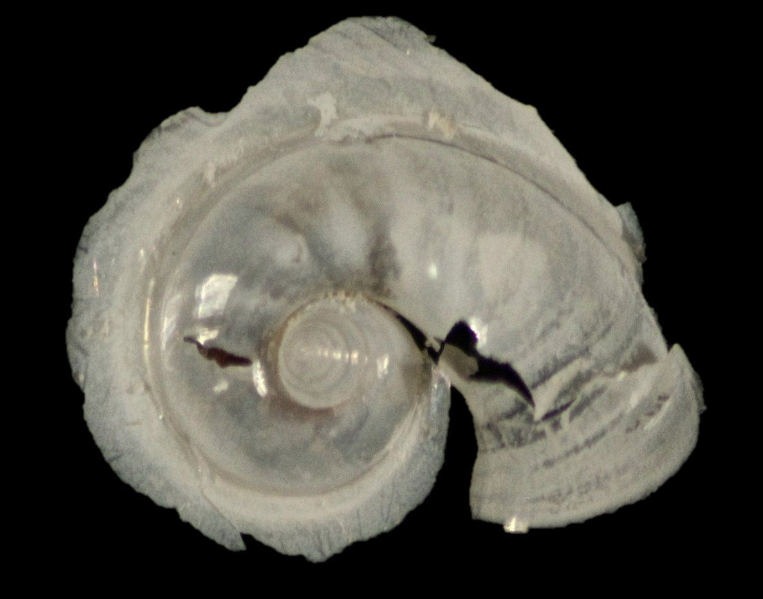
- Shell of Atlanta gibbosa (specimen at Naturalis Biodiversity Center)

Scientific classification
- Kingdom: Animalia
- Phylum: Mollusca
- Class: Gastropoda
- Subclass: Caenogastropoda
- Order: Littorinimorpha
- Family: Atlantidae
- Genus: Atlanta
- Species: A. gibbosa

Binomial name
- Atlanta gibbosa Souleyet, 1852

= Atlanta gibbosa =

Species of gastropod

Atlanta gibbosa is a species of sea snail, a holoplanktonic marine gastropod mollusk in the family Atlantidae.

== Description ==
(Original description in Latin) The shell is glassy, somewhat spherical, humped, and keeled; it is extremely thin and transparent. The spire is conical and directed forward, consisting of seven convex whorls. The body whorl is keeled.

The aperture is ovate-acute (egg-shaped and pointed), and is broadly and deeply notched at the front. The peristome (the margin of the aperture) is thin and sharp, and is interrupted at the back.

The operculum is glassy, ovate-acute, transparent, thin, and has only a few whorls.

(Further description originally in French) The shell of this Atlanta is quite remarkable due to its nearly spherical shape and its protruding, conical spire that is directed forward. There are seven whorls, which are convex in shape; for the greater part of its length, the body whorl bears a fairly wide keel.

The aperture is oval-pointed, with a wide and deep notch at its forward section. The edges are thin and sharp, slightly reflected (turned outward), and separated at the back.

== Distribution ==
This marine species occurs off Mexico.
