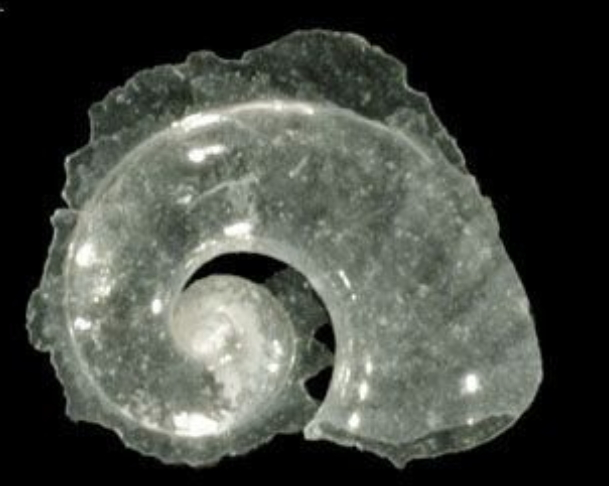
- Atlanta meteori

Scientific classification
- Kingdom: Animalia
- Phylum: Mollusca
- Class: Gastropoda
- Subclass: Caenogastropoda
- Order: Littorinimorpha
- Family: Atlantidae
- Genus: Atlanta
- Species: A. meteori

Binomial name
- Atlanta meteori Richter, 1972

= Atlanta meteori =

Species of gastropod

Atlanta meteori is a species of sea snail, a holoplanktonic marine gastropod mollusk in the family Atlantidae.

== Distribution ==
This species occurs in the Indian Ocean.
