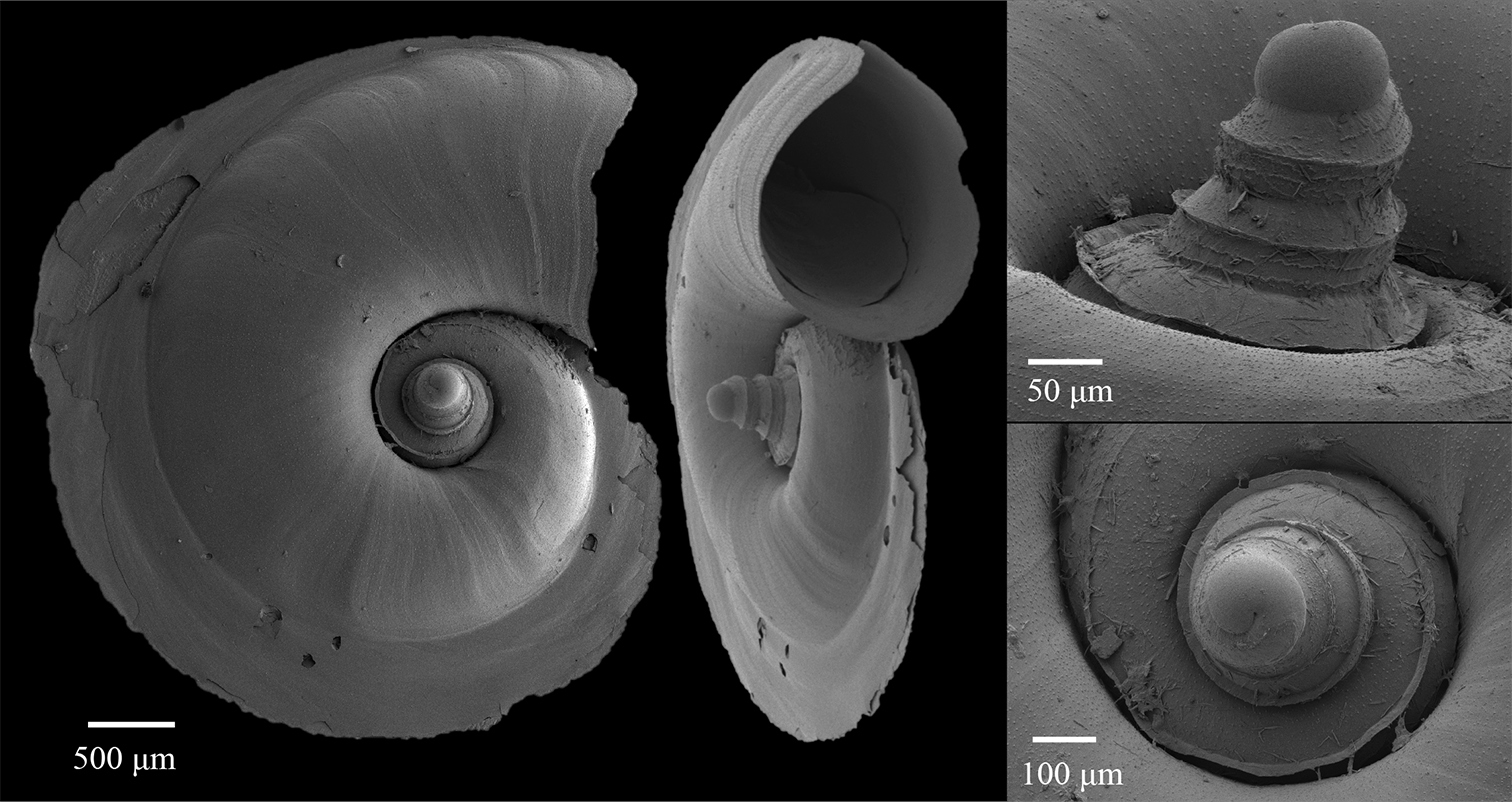
- Shell of Atlanta turriculata (neotype at Naturalis Biodiversity Center)

Scientific classification
- Kingdom: Animalia
- Phylum: Mollusca
- Class: Gastropoda
- Subclass: Caenogastropoda
- Order: Littorinimorpha
- Family: Atlantidae
- Genus: Atlanta
- Species: A. turriculata

Binomial name
- Atlanta turriculata d'Orbigny, 1835

= Atlanta turriculata =

Species of gastropod

Atlanta turriculata is a species of sea snail, a holoplanktonic marine gastropod mollusk in the family Atlantidae.

(Description in Latin by Souleyet) The shell is glassy, disc-shaped, broadly keeled, extremely thin, and transparent. The spire is very small, protruding, and tower-shaped. It is composed of five slightly convex whorls, with the final whorl being keeled.

The aperture is ovate-subacute (somewhat egg-shaped and pointed), slightly reflected (turned back) at the rear, and lightly notched at the front. The peristome (the lip of the shell) is thin and sharp. The operculum is glassy, nearly oval, thin, transparent, and has few whorls.

This species is distinguished by its tower-like (turriculate) spire.
