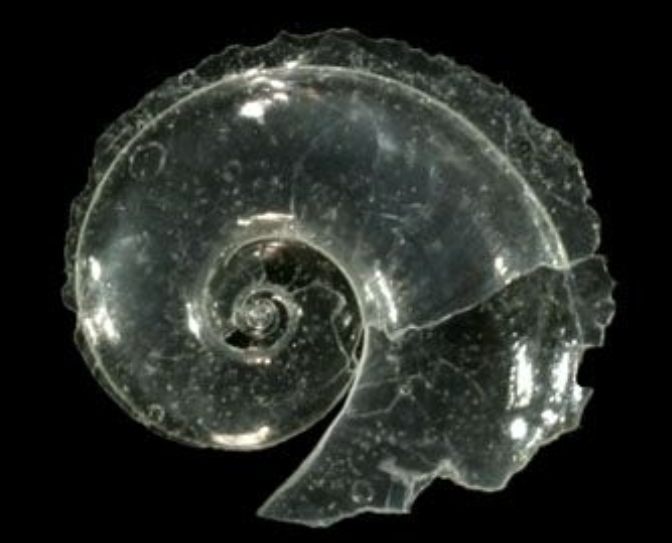
- Atlanta fragilis (specimen in the Natural History Museum Rotterdam)

Scientific classification
- Kingdom: Animalia
- Phylum: Mollusca
- Class: Gastropoda
- Subclass: Caenogastropoda
- Order: Littorinimorpha
- Family: Atlantidae
- Genus: Atlanta
- Species: A. fragilis

Binomial name
- Atlanta fragilis Richter, 1993

= Atlanta fragilis =

Species of gastropod

Atlanta fragilis is a species of sea snail, a holoplanktonic marine gastropod mollusk in the family Atlantidae.

== Description ==
The maximum recorded shell length is 3 mm.

== Habitat ==
Minimum recorded depth is 30 m. Maximum recorded depth is 250 m.
