= Coelodiscus =

Coelodiscus Temporal range: Pliensbachian-Aalenian ~188–170 Ma

Scientific classification
- Kingdom: Animalia
- Phylum: Mollusca
- Class: Gastropoda
- Subclass: Caenogastropoda
- Order: Littorinimorpha
- Family: †Coelodiscidae; Gründel & Nützel, 2013
- Genus: †Coelodiscus; Broesamlen, 1909

Species
- Coelodiscus minutus; Coelodiscus biumbilicatus; Coelodiscus fluegeli; Coelodiscus wrightianus

Extinct genus of gastropods

Ceolodiscus is an extinct genus of gastropod from the Lower and Middle Jurassic of Europe, mostly on Germany, France and United Kingdom. Other possible records include specimens from Hungary of Earliest Jurassic (Hettangian) age. As well there are specimens from Switzerland of Middle Jurassic age. It is the only genus in the monotypic family Coelodiscidae. The genus is usually allied with modern Pterotracheoidea, based mostly on its resemblance with modern Atlanta larvae, yet it differs by lacking extant family affiliations. This genus is linked with the Toarcian Oceanic Anoxic Event, that likely triggered its evolution.

The shell is small but stocky; involute or with a slightly protruding spire. Whorls are generally smooth, evenly rounded and slightly overlapping; umbilicus deep, aperture ovate. Is the oldest known holoplanktonic gastropod, thanks to bilateral symmetrical shells as an adaption to active swimming. Beyond the most common of the sea snails of the Posidonienschiefer Formation, it is also one of the most varied in size terms. It has been related to large floating driftwood as one of the primary settlers.

== See also ==
- Pterotracheoidea
- Atlanta (gastropod)
- Holoplankton
- Toarcian Oceanic Anoxic Event
- Posidonienschiefer Formation
- Jurassic
