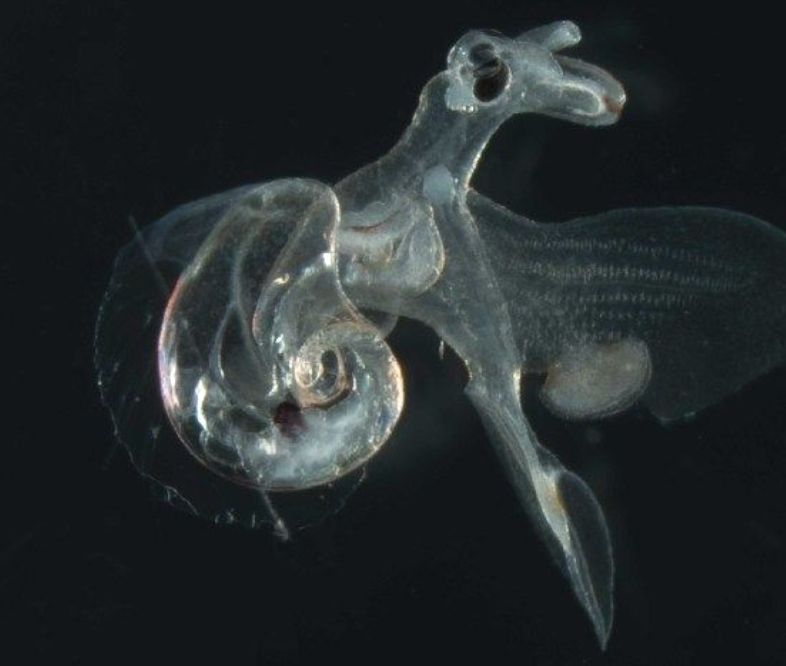
- Atlanta oligogyra

Scientific classification
- Kingdom: Animalia
- Phylum: Mollusca
- Class: Gastropoda
- Subclass: Caenogastropoda
- Order: Littorinimorpha
- Family: Atlantidae
- Genus: Atlanta
- Species: A. oligogyra

Binomial name
- Atlanta oligogyra Tesch, 1906

= Atlanta oligogyra =

Species of gastropod

Atlanta oligogyra is a species of sea snail, a holoplanktonic marine gastropod mollusk in the family Atlantidae.

== Description ==
(Original description in German) The shell, which is usually very small, is distinguished by an extremely diminutive spire. There are only 3 1/2 whorls in total. The body whorl is by far the largest and constitutes nearly the entire shell.

The shell is quite flat and features an oval aperture with a notch in the outer lip; while this notch is shallow, its edges diverge sharply toward the outside. Depending on the age of the shell, the relatively high keel penetrates more or less deeply between the whorls. As seen in other species, the point where the keel attaches is marked by a brown line, though it is less distinct than in Atlanta gaudichaudi.

The shell is entirely devoid of sculpture, though very fine growth lines are visible on the body whorl. Furthermore, no coloration is observable; the entire structure is glass-clear and transparent.

The maximum diameter of the shell is 2 mm, though most specimens are smaller.

The animal is equipped with a powerful proboscis (snout) and well-developed tentacles. It possesses a long, ribbon-like radula with 65 transverse rows. The spine of the central plate is very short—smaller than the lateral processes of the same plate. The intermediate tooth lacks an outer spine, and the lateral teeth, which are nearly equal in size, are hooked at the tips.

== Distribution ==
This marine species occurs off Indonesia.
