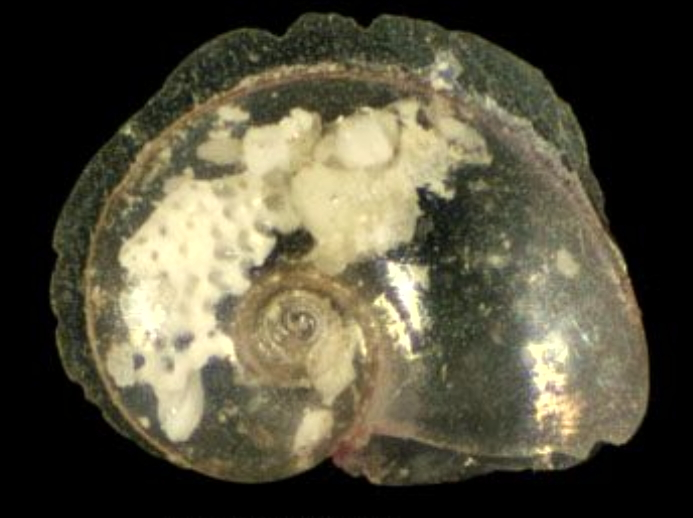
- Atlanta selvagensis (specimen at the Natural History Museum Rotterdam)

Scientific classification
- Kingdom: Animalia
- Phylum: Mollusca
- Class: Gastropoda
- Subclass: Caenogastropoda
- Order: Littorinimorpha
- Family: Atlantidae
- Genus: Atlanta
- Species: A. selvagensis

Binomial name
- Atlanta selvagensis de Vera & Seapy, 2006

Synonyms
- † Atlanta cordiformis Gabb, 1873

= Atlanta selvagensis =

Species of gastropod

Atlanta selvagensis is a species of sea snail, a holoplanktonic marine gastropod mollusk in the family Atlantidae.

== Description ==
(Described as † Atlanta cordiformis) The shell is minute and compressed, featuring a sharply angled dorsal surface and a thin, elevated keel. The apex is depressed and does not project above the height of the body whorl. There are three whorls in total, with one and a half of them visible within the broad, flat umbilicus.

The aperture is distinctly heart-shaped, and the dorsal fissure is deep. The margins of the aperture arch forward in the center, before retreating backward in a regular curve toward the outer edge.

The "heart-shaped" aperture is a very specific diagnostic trait. As the apex is depressed and does not rise above the body whorl, this shell would appear very flat or even slightly sunken when viewed from the side, a common feature in discoid (disc-shaped) pelagic snails.

== Distribution ==
This marine species was found off the Selvagens Islands, an archipelago in the North Atlantic Ocean.
