= Atlanta ariejansseni =

Scientific classification
- Kingdom: Animalia
- Phylum: Mollusca
- Class: Gastropoda
- Subclass: Caenogastropoda
- Order: Littorinimorpha
- Family: Atlantidae
- Genus: Atlanta
- Species: A. ariejansseni

Binomial name
- Atlanta ariejansseni Wall-Palmer, Burridge & Peijnenburg, 2016

Species of gastropod

Atlanta ariejansseni is a species of sea snail, a holoplanktonic marine gastropod mollusk in the family Atlantidae.

== Distribution ==
This marine species is found in the Southern Subtropical Convergence Zone
