= Atlanta rosea =

Scientific classification
- Kingdom: Animalia
- Phylum: Mollusca
- Class: Gastropoda
- Subclass: Caenogastropoda
- Order: Littorinimorpha
- Family: Atlantidae
- Genus: Atlanta
- Species: A. rosea

Binomial name
- Atlanta rosea Gray, 1850

Synonyms
- Atlanta rosea Souleyet, 1852 ·

Species of gastropod

Atlanta rosea is a species of sea snail, a holoplanktonic marine gastropod mollusk in the family Atlantidae.

Richter (1993) confirmed the validity of this species on the basis of morphology and anatomical characteristics

== Description ==
(Original description in Latin) The shell is glassy, disc-shaped, broadly keeled, extremely thin, and translucent. The spire is depressed and flattened. There are six whorls, which are convex-depressed, with the body whorl being keeled. The aperture is ovate-acute, slightly reflected at the back, and at the front, it is tapered and deeply split; the peristome (the lip of the shell) is thin and sharp.

The operculum is glassy, oval, thin, translucent, and has only a few spirals.

== Distribution ==
This species occurs in the Tyrrhenian Sea in Sicily and in the Ionian Sea.
