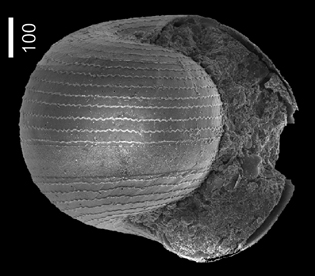
- The shell of Oxygyrus keraudrenii, a species closely resembling Bellerophina

Scientific classification
- Kingdom: Animalia
- Phylum: Mollusca
- Class: Gastropoda
- Subclass: Caenogastropoda
- Order: Littorinimorpha
- Superfamily: Pterotracheoidea
- Family: †Bellerophinidae; Destombes, 1984

= Bellerophinidae =

Bellerophinidae Temporal range: Middle Triassic–Albian

Extinct family of gastropods

Bellerophinidae is an extinct family of sea snails, marine gastropod molluscs in the clade Littorinimorpha. It is considered by WoRMS to contain 2 genera; Bellerophina and Freboldia. Despite Bellerophina being the namesake of this family, more recent research has moved the genus to the family Atlantidae on the basis of similar shell morphology to the extant genus Oxygyrus, although the exact relationship remains unclear.

== Description ==
Both genera in Bellerophinidae share small, thin, rounded, and bilaterally symmetrical aragonitic shells. Bellerophina is morphologically similar to and likely closely related to the Atlantids, with their shared adaptations and minuscule maximum shell size of 6-8mm making it probable that both genera in Bellerophinidae would have shared their lifestyle as active holoplanktonic predatory micromolluscs.

=== †Freboldia d'Orbigny, 1843 ===
The genus Freboldia contains two species; F. carinii, and F. fluitans. It was named after the late Hans Frebold, a German paleontologist who was instrumental in advancing paleontology in the Arctic. F. fluitans dates to the Early Jurassic (Late Pliensbachian/Early Toarcian) of Ellesmere Island. The shells of F. fluitans are small, reaching at most 8 mm in diameter and 6.3 mm in height, and thin, ranging from 25-40 µm in thickness. The shape is described as "inflated, globular, planispiral, bilaterally symmetrical, with deep umbilici." The aperture is kidney-shaped, being taller than it is wide when viewed from the side, with the inner lip curving inwards whilst the outer lip curves outwards. Mature shells are smooth except for straight growth-lines that run parallel to the shell axis at the edges and touch the umbilicus at a single point, whilst young shells have vague spirals and tubercles. A presumed larval shell under 1 mm in size has very thin indents along the whorls lacking in older individuals, which would be unique among known holoplanktonic gastropods. The bilateral symmetry of the shell makes it difficult to tell which direction the whorls coil in. F. carinii is known from the Middle Triassic of the Brembana Valley, very closely resembling the other species except in being much older; if it shared the proposed lifestyle of F. fluitans, it would be the oldest known holoplanktonic gastropod.

=== †Bellerophina Nützel & S. Schneider, 2016 ===
The genus Bellerophina has been proposed to contain up to 3 species, including B. minuta, B. recens, and B. vibrayi. However, the classification of B. recens is problematic, and B. vibrayi is a synonym of B. minuta. B. minuta is known from the Early Cretaceous (Albian) of England, originally being incorrectly classified as Ammonites minutus. The shell is small, thin, rounded, bilaterally symmetrical, up to 6 mm in diameter, and has a deep umbilicus. It is ornamented with a grid of raised lines following the curvature, closely resembling larval Oxygyrus inflatus; Freboldia also closely resembles Bellerophina in shape but lacks the lines.
