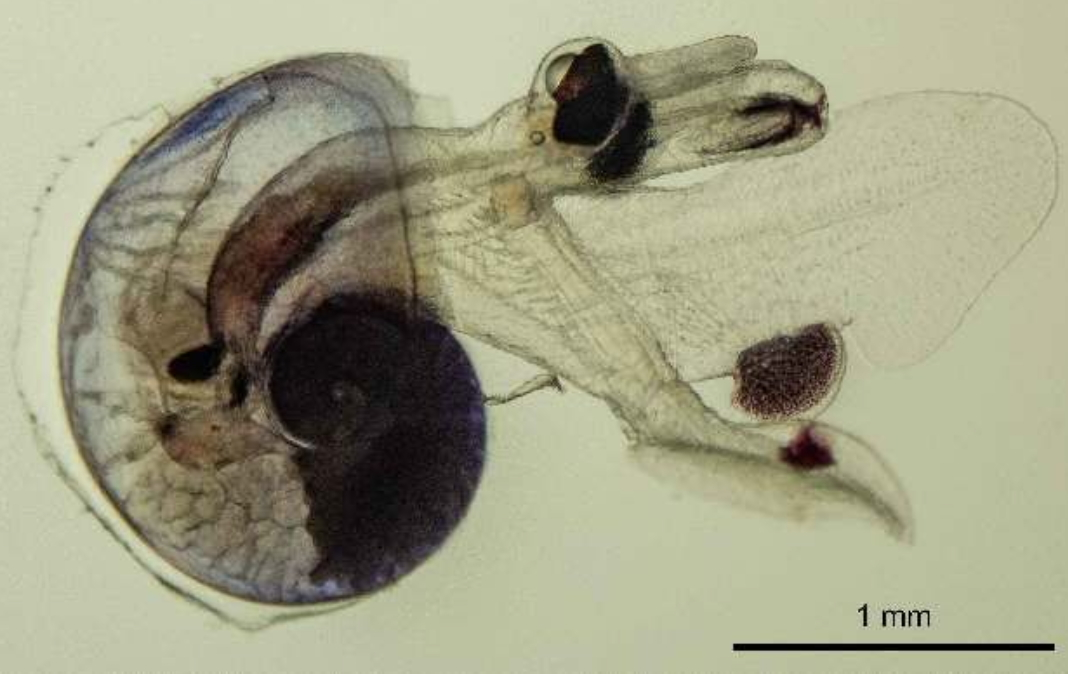
- Atlanta helicinoidea

Scientific classification
- Kingdom: Animalia
- Phylum: Mollusca
- Class: Gastropoda
- Subclass: Caenogastropoda
- Order: Littorinimorpha
- Family: Atlantidae
- Genus: Atlanta
- Species: A. helicinoidea

Binomial name
- Atlanta helicinoidea J. E. Gray, 1850

Synonyms
- Atlanta depressa Souleyet, 1852; Atlanta depressa Gray, 1850 (doubtful synonym); Atlanta helicinoides Souleyet, 1852

= Atlanta helicinoidea =

Species of gastropod

Atlanta helicinoidea is a species of sea snail, a holoplanktonic marine gastropod mollusk in the family Atlantidae.

== Description ==
The maximum recorded shell length is 4 mm.

(Described in Latin as Atlanta helicinoides) The shell is glassy, disc-shaped, broadly keeled, translucent, and very thin. The spire is very small, protruding, and conical. There are seven whorls, which are convex-depressed, with the body whorl being keeled. This keel is bordered at the base with a rust-colored margin. The aperture is ovate-acute and notched at the front; the peristome (the lip of the shell) is thin and sharp.

The operculum is glassy, oval, thin, translucent, and has only a few spirals.

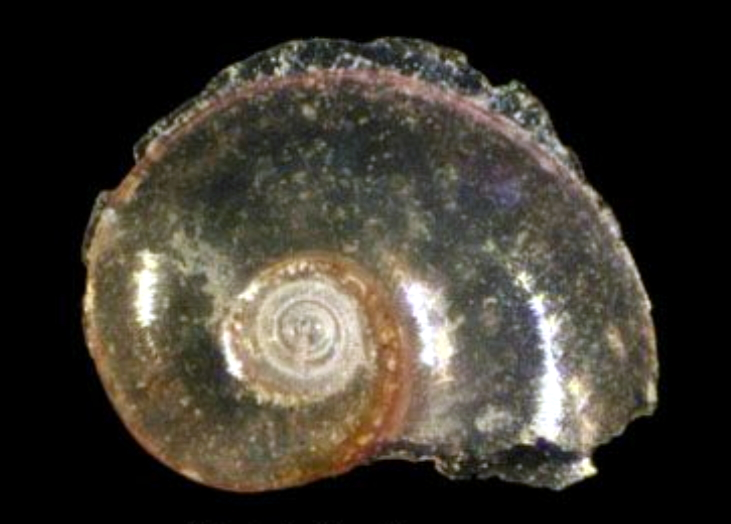
Shell of Atlanta helicinoidea (specimen at the Natural History Museum Rotterdam

== Distribution ==
This marine species is circumglobal and is seen near shore of East and South China Sea.。

== Habitat ==
Minimum recorded depth is 0 m. Maximum recorded depth is 0 m.
