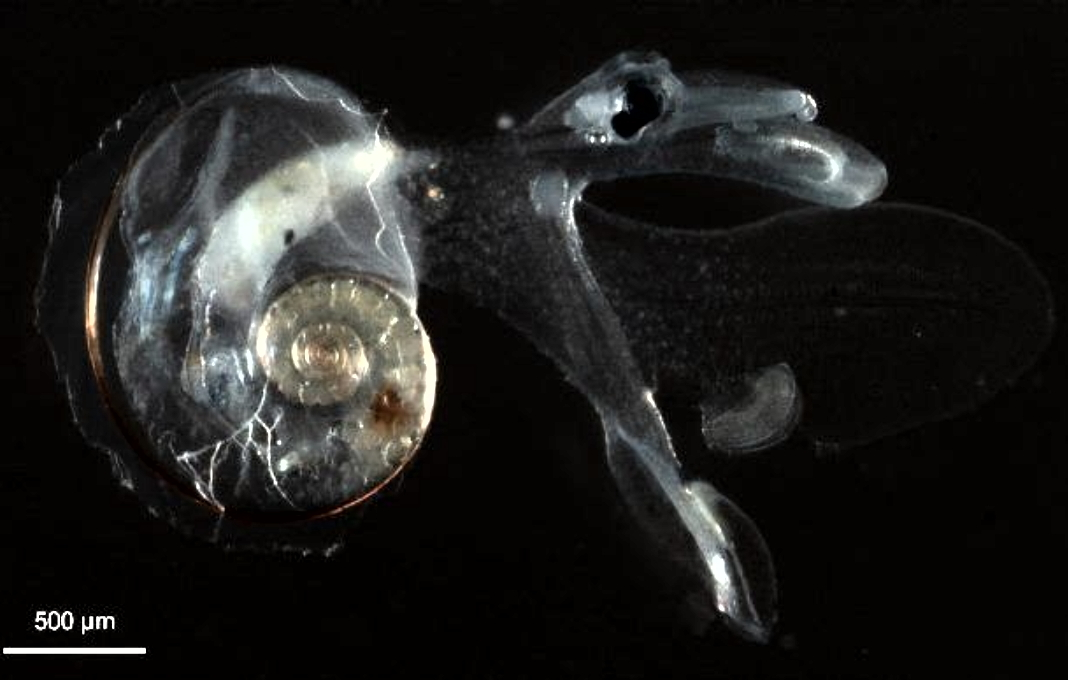
- Atlanta plana

Scientific classification
- Kingdom: Animalia
- Phylum: Mollusca
- Class: Gastropoda
- Subclass: Caenogastropoda
- Order: Littorinimorpha
- Family: Atlantidae
- Genus: Atlanta
- Species: A. plana

Binomial name
- Atlanta plana Richter, 1972

= Atlanta plana =

Species of gastropod

Atlanta plana is a species of sea snail, a holoplanktonic marine gastropod mollusk in the family Atlantidae.

== Description ==
The length of the shell attains 4.4 mm; its height 1.52 mm.

== Distribution ==
This species occurs in the Red Sea and the Gulf of Aden.
