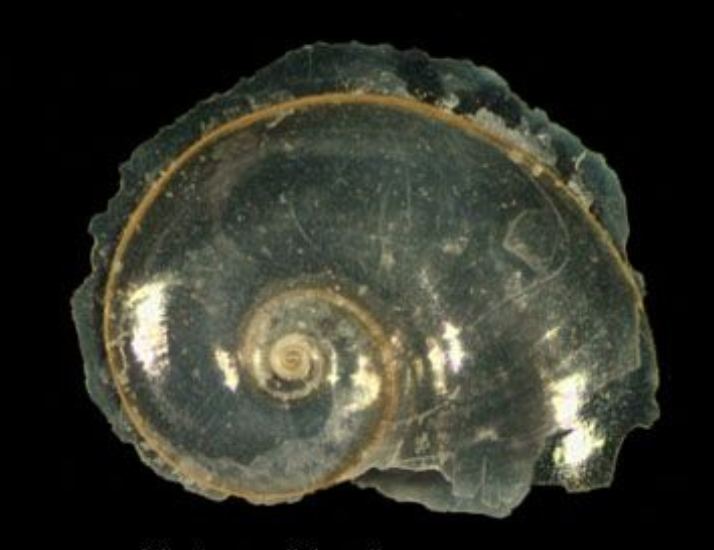

Scientific classification
- Kingdom: Animalia
- Phylum: Mollusca
- Class: Gastropoda
- Subclass: Caenogastropoda
- Order: Littorinimorpha
- Family: Atlantidae
- Genus: Atlanta
- Species: A. gaudichaudi

Binomial name
- Atlanta gaudichaudi J. E. Gray, 1850

Synonyms
- Atlanta gaudichaudii Souleyet, 1852; Atlanta pacifica Tokioka, 1955

= Atlanta gaudichaudi =

Species of gastropod

Atlanta gaudichaudi is a species of sea snail, a holoplanktonic marine gastropod mollusk in the family Atlantidae.

== Description ==
(Originally described in Latin) The shell is glassy, somewhat ovate-discoid, keeled, translucent, and very thin. The spire is very small and flattened. There are five whorls, which are convex-depressed, with the body whorl being keeled. This keel is bordered at the base with a pink margin. The aperture is ovate to sub-acute and notched at the front; the peristome is thin and sharp.

The operculum is glassy, ovate-subacute, thin, translucent, and has only a few spirals.
