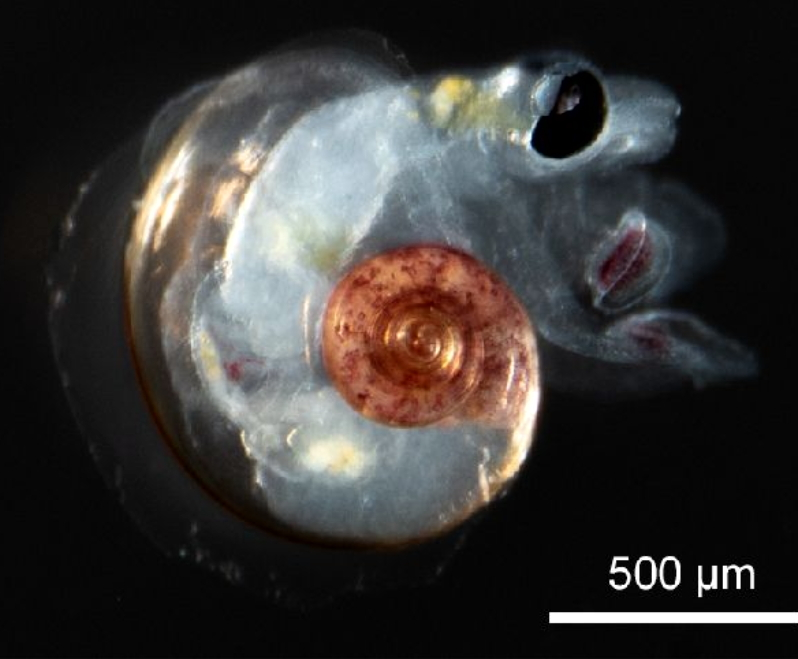
- Atlanta inflata

Scientific classification
- Kingdom: Animalia
- Phylum: Mollusca
- Class: Gastropoda
- Subclass: Caenogastropoda
- Order: Littorinimorpha
- Family: Atlantidae
- Genus: Atlanta
- Species: A. inflata

Binomial name
- Atlanta inflata J. E. Gray, 1850

Synonyms
- Atlanta inflata Souleyet, 1852; Atlanta quoyana Souleyet, 1852; Atlanta quoyii J. E. Gray, 1850

= Atlanta inflata =

Species of gastropod

Atlanta inflata is a species of sea snail, a holoplanktonic marine gastropod mollusk in the family Atlantidae.

== Description ==
The maximum recorded shell length is 3 mm.

(Described in Latin as Atlanta inflata Souleyet, 1852) The shell is glassy, disc-shaped, keeled, translucent, and very thin. The spire is very small, slightly protruding, and sharply conical. There are seven whorls, which are convex; the body whorl is inflated and keeled. The aperture is ovate to sub-acute, slightly reflected at the back, and notched at the front; the peristome (the lip) is thin and sharp.

The operculum is glassy, oval, thin, translucent, and has only a few spirals.

== Habitat ==
Minimum recorded depth is 0 m. Maximum recorded depth is 0 m.
