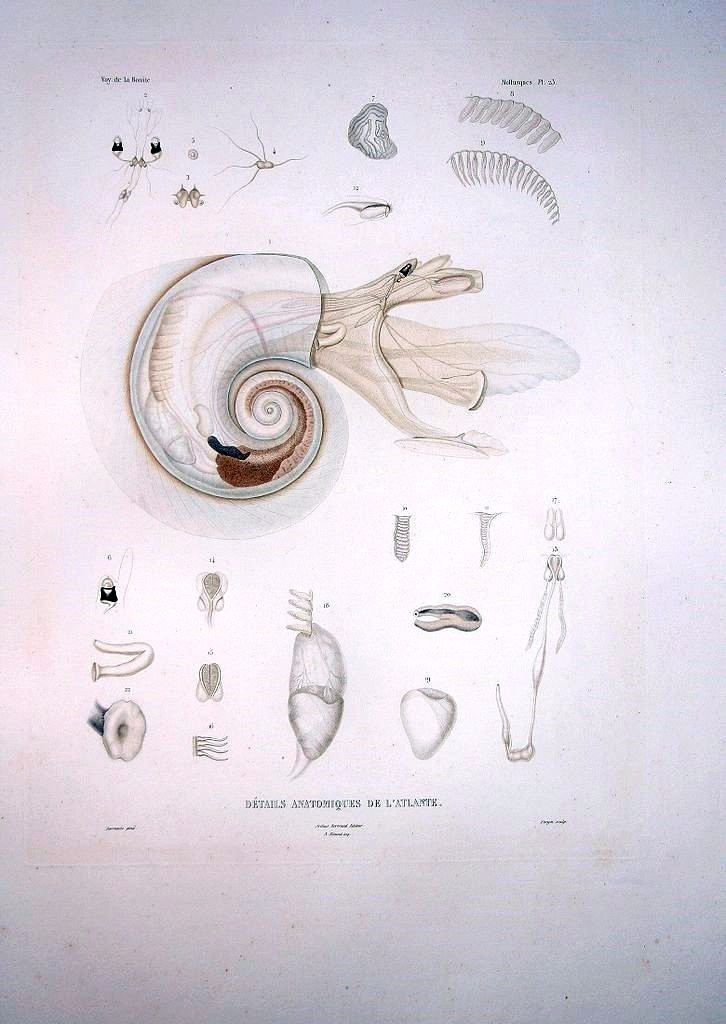
- Atlanta anatomy

Scientific classification
- Kingdom: Animalia
- Phylum: Mollusca
- Class: Gastropoda
- Subclass: Caenogastropoda
- Order: Littorinimorpha
- Superfamily: Pterotracheoidea
- Family: Atlantidae
- Genus: Atlanta; Lesueur, 1817

Type species
- Atlanta peronii Lesueur, 1817

Species
- See text

Synonyms
- Atlanta (Atlanta) Lesueur, 1817 superseded rank; Atlanta (Helicophlegma) A. d'Orbigny, 1836 junior subjective synonym; Brownia A. d'Orbigny, 1841 junior subjective synonym; Coelodiscopsis F. Nordsieck & García-Talavera, 1979; Helicophlegma A. d'Orbigny, 1836; Ladas Cantraine, 1841; Steira Eschscholtz, 1825

= Atlanta (gastropod) =

Atlanta Temporal range: Bartonian–Recent Bartonian-Recent

Genus of gastropods

Atlanta is a genus of pelagic marine gastropod molluscs in the family Atlantidae.

They are sometimes called heteropods.

== Distribution ==
All the species but one, Atlanta californiensis, dwell in tropical and subtropical waters. The majority of species (ten) are cosmopolitan and, among the remaining nine species, five are Indo-Pacific, two are restricted to the Pacific Ocean, one is Indo-Atlantic, and one is limited to the Atlantic Ocean.

They are floating or swimming snails in tropical and subtropical seas. Most have a cosmopolitan distribution, but A. brunnea, A. pulchella and A. quoyi are only found in American waters. A. fusca, A. pacifica and A. rosea are restricted to the seas around Japan.

== Description ==
It has been recognized by several authors that identification of species in this genus is difficult and is dependent on their morphology of eyes, radula and operculum.

Main diagnostic features include: the shell and keel are calcareous; larval shell becomes the spire in the adult shell.

Snails of this genus are very small. Their coiled, calcareous shell has a diameter of less than 1 cm. The protoconch of the larval shell is retained after metamorphosis and becomes the spire of the adult shell. The number of spire whirls varies from 2½ (in the A. lesueuri- group) to 6 (A. gibbosa) and is thus also helpful in the identification of a species. The spire shape differs between the species groups, from very small (A. lesueuri- group), to inflated or flat (A. inflata- group ) to large (A.inclinata- group and A. gibbosa- group).

They can retract into their shell and close it off with an operculum. This operculum is cartilaginous and flexible. In 1961 Richter distinguished three types of the operculum in which the larval gyre of the operculum is apical. This gyre can be relatively somewhat larger (macro-oligogyre), smaller (micro-oligogyre) or a single gyre (monogyre).

The eye morphology also consists of three types with differences in pigmented region between the lens and the retina.

The radula is typically taenioglossate with one central (rachidian) tooth, with on each side one lateral tooth and two marginal teeth. In 13 species the number of tooth rows increases during growth (Type I), while in 8 species the radula has a limited number of tooth rows (Type II).

== Identification ==
The Atlanta, whose discovery dates back to the La Pérouse expedition and which were so named by Mr. Lesueur—though Mr. Rang was the first to make their true characteristics known—complete the series of Heteropods. They link these mollusks to the Gastropods, whose entire conformation they share, as we have previously seen.

The Atlanta do not differ as much from the Carinaria Lamarck, 1801 as one might believe at first glance; one can even form a very accurate idea of them by imagining them as Carinaria whose bodies, while retaining their shape, have been reduced in proportion, and whose shells have simultaneously achieved a development large enough for the animal to retract into them entirely. The branchial cavity with which they are provided, and the slightly different termination of the intestine and the oviduct within this cavity, are evidently nothing more than the result of this shell development, which has brought about an analogous development in the corresponding part of the mantle.

Finally, the ability of the Atlanta to shelter themselves completely within their shells further explains the presence in these mollusks of an operculum, arranged exactly as it is in Gastropods with turbinate shells.

Many authors (e.g., Thiriot-Quiévreux, 1973, p. 240; Richter, 1974, p. 60; Seapy, 1990, p. 107) admit that identification of Atlanta species is difficult and including soft-part features (eyes, radula, operculum) or application of transmitted light to observe inner shell structures (Richter, 1987, p. 178) are very helpful in distinguishing species with similar shells. However, such methods are unavailable for fossil material. This makes identifying fossil species of Atlanta quite difficult and even well-preserved specimens occasionally can only be related to existing taxa with a query (e.g., Atlanta sp. in Janssen, 2004, p. 108; Atlanta cf. echinogyra in Jansen 2007). Advantageous in this study of fossil atlantids, however, is the fact that all specimens are preserved as opaque aragonitic shells as a result of recrystallisation, which facilitates assessing protoconch shape and ornament with a normal 25 or 50× binocular magnification, they are thus much easier studied than in the usually very transparent and shiny Recent specimens. Still, here, too, study of the larval shell shape and micro-ornamentation by SEM is highly desirable or even indispensable.

== Species ==
Atlanta includes a large number of Recent species. Lalli & Gilmer (1989) listed 14 species, but Richter & Seapy (1999) recognised 21 extant species, provisionally subdivided into seven 'species groups' (and one species unassigned). A further Recent species was described since; Atlanta selvagensis de Vera & Seapy, 2006.

Species in the genus Atlanta include:

- † Atlanta arenularia Gougerot & Braillon, 1965 - this is the oldest known Atlanta from the Bartonian of the Paris Basin
- Atlanta ariejansseni Wall-Palmer, Burridge & Peijnenburg, 2016
- Atlanta brunnea J. E. Gray, 1850
- Atlanta californiensis Seapy & Richter, 1993
- † Atlanta diamesa Woodring, 1928
- Atlanta echinogyra Richter, 1972
- † Atlanta eocenica K. van W. Palmer, 1937
- Atlanta fragilis Richter, 1993
- Atlanta frontieri Richter, 1993
- † Atlanta funicularis Garvie, 2013
- Atlanta gaudichaudi Souleyet, 1852
- Atlanta gibbosa Souleyet, 1852
- Atlanta helicinoidea J. E. Gray, 1850
- Atlanta inclinata J. E. Gray, 1850
- † Atlanta indoceratoides Beets, 1942
- Atlanta inflata J. E. Gray, 1850
- Atlanta involuta Souleyet, 1852
- Atlanta lesueurii J. E. Gray, 1850
- † Atlanta lingayanensis Janssen, 2007 - from Pliocene of Philippines
- Atlanta meteori Richter, 1972
- † Atlanta oanei Stancu, 1978
- Atlanta oligogyra Tesch, 1906
- Atlanta peronii Lesueur, 1817
- Atlanta plana Richter, 1972
- Atlanta pulchella Verrill, 1884 (taxon inquirendum)
- † Atlanta richteri Janssen, 2007 - from Pliocene of Philippines
- Atlanta rosea Gray, 1850
- † Atlanta seapyi Janssen, 2007 - from Pliocene of Philippines
- Atlanta selvagensis de Vera & Seapy, 2006
- Atlanta tokiokai van der Spoel & Troost, 1972
- Atlanta turriculata d'Orbigny, 1836
- Atlanta vanderspoeli Wall-Palmer, Hegmann & Peijnenburg, 2019

== Species brought into synonymy ==
- Subgenus Atlanta (Heliconoides) d'Orbigny, 1835: synonym of Heliconoides d'Orbigny, 1835
- Atlanta bulimoides d'Orbigny, 1834: synonym of Limacina bulimoides (d'Orbigny, 1834)
- † Atlanta cordiformis Gabb, 1873: synonym of Atlanta selvagensis de Vera & Seapy, 2006
- Atlanta depressa Gray, 1850: synonym of Atlanta helicinoidea J. E. Gray, 1850 (doubtful synonym)
- Atlanta fusca Souleyet, 1852: synonym of Atlanta brunnea J. E. Gray, 1850
- Atlanta gaudichaudii Souleyet, 1852: synonym of Atlanta gaudichaudi J. E. Gray, 1850
- Atlanta helicinoides Souleyet, 1852: synonym of Atlanta helicinoidea J. E. Gray, 1850
- Atlanta inclinata Souleyet, 1852: synonym of Atlanta inclinata J. E. Gray, 1850
- Atlanta inflata Souleyet, 1852: synonym of Atlanta inflata J. E. Gray, 1850
- Atlanta inflata d'Orbigny, 1834: synonym of Heliconoides inflata (d'Orbigny, 1834)
- Atlanta keraudrenii Lesueur, 1817: synonym of Atlanta peronii Lesueur, 1817
- Atlanta lamanoni Gray, 1850: synonym of Protatlanta souleyeti (E. A. Smith, 1888)
- Atlanta lamanonii Souleyet, 1852: synonym of Protatlanta souleyeti (E. A. Smith, 1888)
- Atlanta lesueurii Souleyet, 1852: synonym of Atlanta lesueurii J. E. Gray, 1850
- Atlanta lesueurii d'Orbigny, 1835: synonym of Limacina lesueurii (d'Orbigny, 1835)
- Atlanta quoyana Smith, 1888: synonym of Atlanta quoyii J. E. Gray, 1850
- Atlanta quoyana Souleyet, 1852: synonym of Atlanta inflata J. E. Gray, 1850
- Atlanta quoyii Gray, 1850: synonym of Atlanta inflata J. E. Gray, 1850
- Atlanta rangii A. d'Orbigny, 1835: synonym of Limacina rangii (A. d'Orbigny, 1835) (superseded combination)
- † Atlanta rotundata Gabb, 1873: synonym of † Atlantidea rotundata (Gabb, 1873): synonym of † Protatlanta rotundata (Gabb, 1873)
- Atlanta steindachneri Oberwimmer, 1898: synonym of Atlanta peronii Lesueur, 1817
- Atlanta trochiformis d'Orbigny, 1834: synonym of Limacina trochiformis (d'Orbigny, 1834)

Based on similar morphologies, these species have been placed in seven species groups:

- Atlanta (19 recent species)
  - Atlanta brunnea species group
    - Atlanta brunnea
    - Atlanta turriculata
  - Atlanta inflata species group
    - Atlanta inflata
    - Atlanta helicinoidea
    - Atlanta californiensis
    - Atlanta selvagensis
  - Atlanta lesueurii species group
    - Atlanta lesueurii
    - Atlanta oligogyra
  - Atlanta peronii species group
    - Atlanta peronii
    - Atlanta fragilis
    - Atlanta rosea
    - Atlanta frontieri
  - Atlanta gaudichaudi species group
    - Atlanta gaudichaudi
    - Atlanta plana
    - Atlanta echinogyra
  - Atlanta inclinata species group
    - Atlanta inclinata
    - Atlanta tokiokai
  - Atlanta gaudichaudi species group
    - Atlanta gibbosa
    - Atlanta meteori

Tesch (1908) was the first to group together the species of Atlanta sharing similar morphologies. He recognized four species groups; the Atlanta peronii-, Atlanta inflata-, Atlanta turriculata-, and Atlanta inclinata-groups. In addition to these four, three additional ones are currently recognized; the Atlanta lesueurii-, Atlanta gaudichaudi- and Atlanta gibbosa groups. Except for Tesch's Atlanta turriculata-group, the composition of Tesch's species groups has changed by species invalidations, the addition of new species over time, and addition of three new species groups. The main changes in Tesch's species groups have occurred in the Atlanta peronii-group (with Atlanta gaudichaudi and Atlanta lesueurii now forming their own species groups) and the Atlanta inclinata-group (the Atlanta gibbosa now forming its own group).
