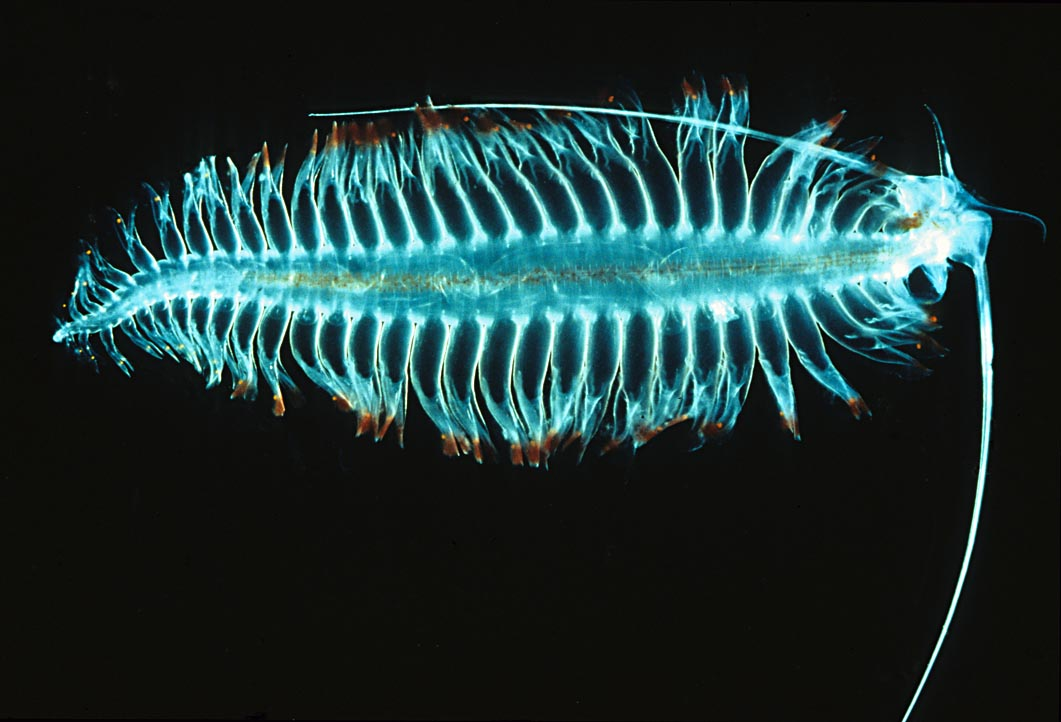

Scientific classification
- Kingdom: Animalia
- Phylum: Annelida
- Clade: Pleistoannelida
- Subclass: Errantia
- Family: Tomopteridae
- Genus: Tomopteris; Eschscholtz, 1825

Species
- Tomopteris catharina; Tomopteris elegans Chun, 1888; Tomopteris helgolandica; Tomopteris pacifica; Tomopteris planctonis; Tomopteris nisseni; Tomopteris renata; Tomopteris cavalli; Tomopteris septentrionalis Steenstrup

= Tomopteris =

Genus of annelids

The gossamer worm (scientific name Tomopteris, Neo-Latin from Greek meaning "a cut" + "wing" but taken to mean "fin") is a genus of marine planktonic polychaetes. All described species are known to be holoplanktic, meaning that they spend their entire life cycles in the water column.

E. Newton Harvey had noted the unusual yellow bioluminescence occurring from the parapodia. There are very few known marine animals that exhibit yellow luminescence. Many species of plankton are known to display this property of bioluminescence. The mechanisms of this process are not well understood; only that they do not use any of the currently known luciferins. If disturbed, a few species are known to release bioluminescent particles from their parapodia, though possibly all species of Tomopteris do this. It is thought that this mode is to distract predators, analogous to chaff or flares dispensed from military aircraft during evasive maneuvers.

Generally, gossamer worms grow to only a few centimeters in overall length, or 20 millimetres (0.79 in) to 40 millimetres (1.6 in) in total length, though this is likely to reflect the size of those amenable to being caught in trawl nets.
