= Meroplankton =

Aquatic organisms with multiple life stages

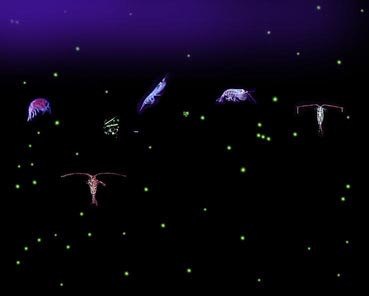
Assemblage of planktonic organisms

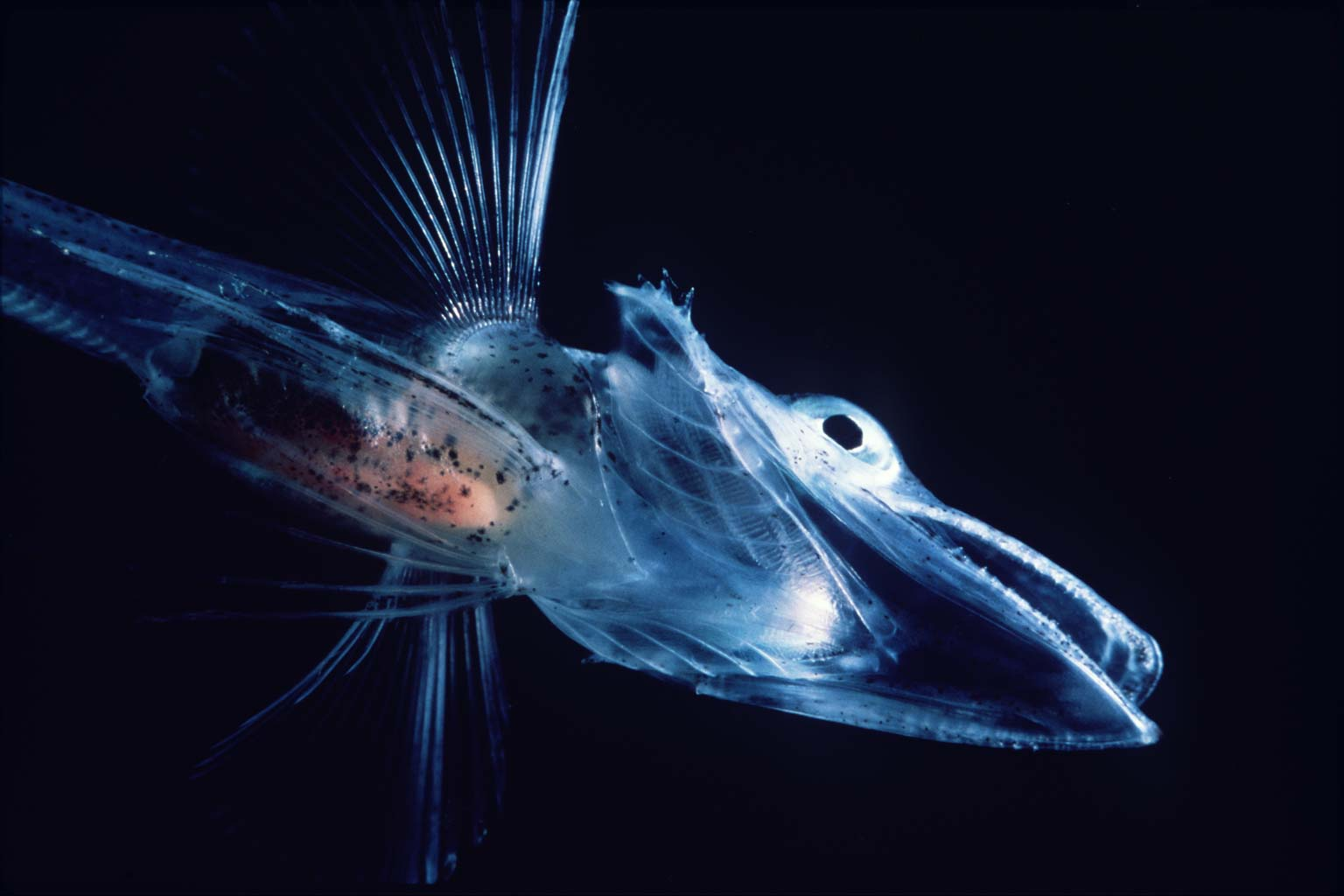
Icefish larva

Meroplankton are a wide variety of aquatic organisms which have both a planktonic stage and at least one other component, such as benthic or nektonic, in their life cycles. Much of the meroplankton consists of larval stages of larger organisms. Meroplankton can be contrasted with holoplankton, which are planktonic organisms that stay in the pelagic zone as plankton throughout their entire life cycle.

After a period of time in the plankton, many meroplankton graduate to the nekton or adopt a benthic (often sessile) lifestyle on the seafloor. The larval stages of benthic invertebrates make up a significant proportion of planktonic communities. The planktonic larval stage is particularly crucial to many benthic invertebrate in order to disperse their young. Depending on the particular species and the environmental conditions, larval or juvenile-stage meroplankton may remain in the pelagic zone for durations ranging from hour to months.

Not all meroplankton are larvae or juvenile stages of larger organisms. Many dinoflagellates are meroplanktonic, undergoing a seasonal cycle of encystment and dormancy in the benthic zone followed by excystment and reproduction in the pelagic zone before returning to the benthic zone once more. There also exist meroplanktonic diatoms; these have a seasonal resting phase below the photic zone and can be found commonly amongst the benthos of lakes and coastal zones.

== Spatial distribution ==
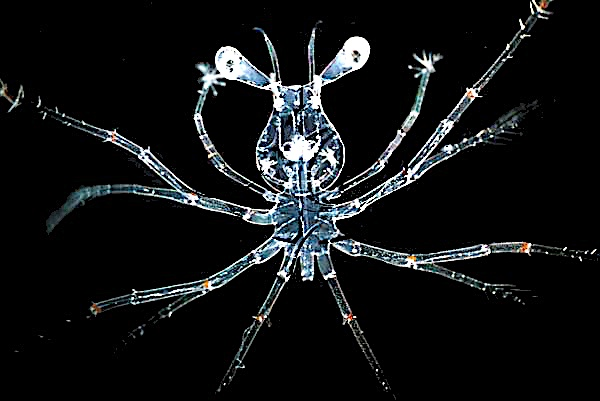
Larva stage of a spiny lobster

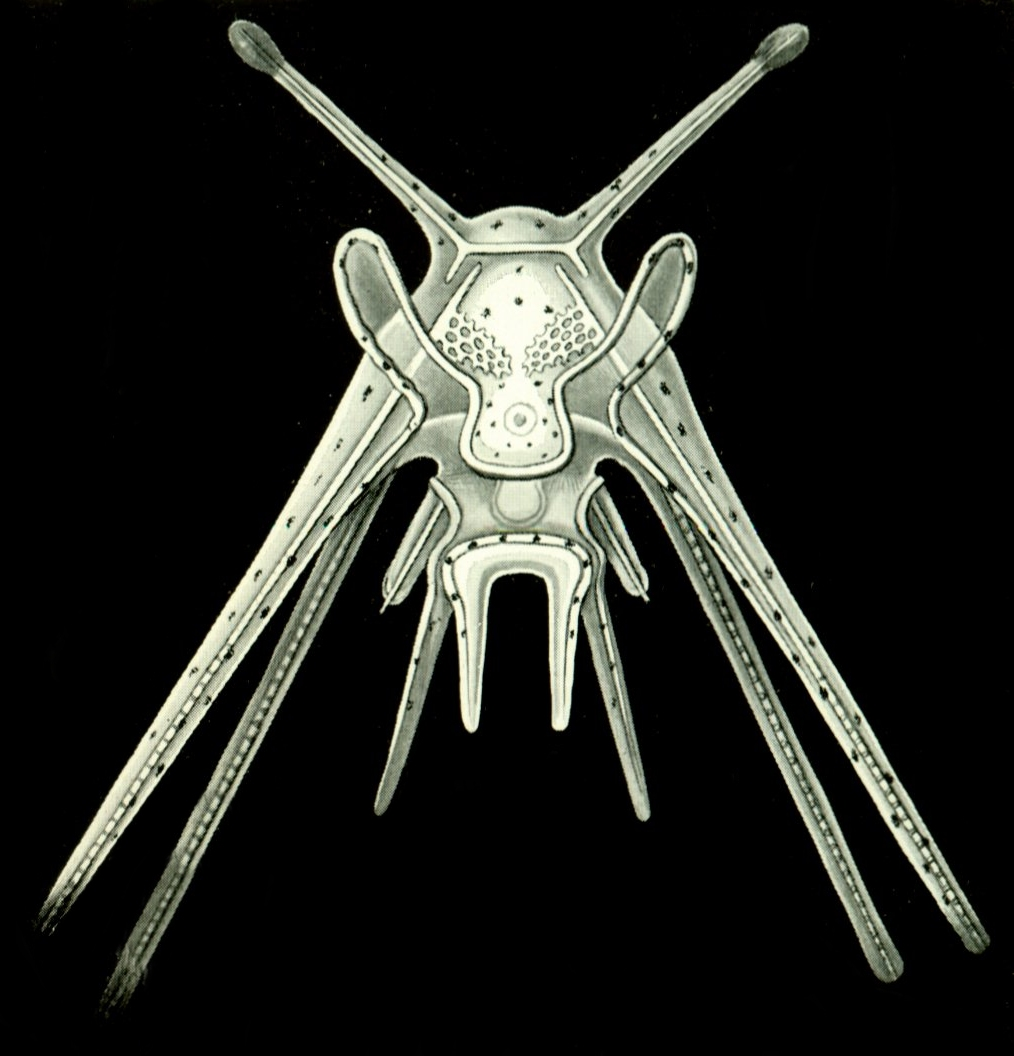
Early larval state of a sea urchin larva (drawing by Haeckel)

Meroplankton species composition depends on spatial distribution and reproductive habits of adults in a given area. Biotic and abiotic factors such as tidal and lunar cycles and availability of food determine adult spawning schedules, in turn, determining subsequent meroplankton populations. Behavioural factors, such as predator avoidance are also important. Freshwater inputs play a key role in meroplankton species composition in estuarine environments. Effects of tides contribute greatly to meroplankton species distribution. One study conducted in a Patagonian Fjord found that species composition of the meroplankton community depended on the seasonally varying input levels from the Baker river as well as vertical and horizontal stratification of the water column. Events such as wind driven upwelling and downwelling also affect meroplankton species distribution. Most species are swept in the direction of the flow of water, either off shore during an upwelling or near shore during a downwelling. Some species, such as bivalve larvae, have the ability to maintain their nearshore position during these events.

The distribution of meroplankton is also highly seasonal. Many meroplankton have short residence times in the pelagic zone which follow seasonal reproduction patterns. The timing of meroplankton population rises can be used as a proxy to estimate the timing of seasonal reproduction of the species in question.

== Dispersal ==
Survival rate of Meroplankton is critical to successful development of adult organisms. One factor which often determines meroplankton survival is larval dispersal. Most species within the meroplankton community rely on ocean currents for dispersal. Currents play a key role in delivering larval organisms to specific settlement locations, where they are able to transition and mature into adult forms. Organisms which do not make it to the right settlement site are unlikely to complete their lifecycle.

== Food availability ==
A major factor affecting meroplankton survival is food availability. While some larval or juvenile stage organisms are lecitotrophic, many members of the meroplankton community are heterotrophic. In order to ensure that larvae have sufficient sources of nutrition, many species coordinate larval release with times of algal blooms. This synchronicity between release of larvae and algal blooms often leads to meroplankton making up the largest percentage of the planktonic community during such reproductive periods. It has been demonstrated that certain species are able to commence spawning as they come into contact with phytoplankton cells. These species store embryos in the mantle cavity until they detect algal blooms. This adaptation allows for better larval survival.

== Diversity and abundance ==
Meroplankton diversity and abundance are affected by many factors. Seasonal and spatial variations are among some of the main causes of such variability. A study which was conducted in Dunkellin Estuary, determined that spawning times of many species are timed to maximise food availability at a particular time of year, while minimising presence of other species which exploit the same food source Diversity and abundance are depth dependent qualities. Generally, shallow coastal waters contain far greater numbers of meroplankton than deep, open ocean waters. Most abundant regions occur at depths between 0 and 200 meters of the water column, where light penetration is highest. Availability of sunlight allows for proliferation of phytoplankton, which serves as one of the major food sources for meroplankton. Deep oceanic waters show significantly lower abundance than shelf regions, due to poor light penetration.

== Effects of pollution ==
Water and benthos pollution from industrial sources has been demonstrated to have varying effects on biological diversity and survival potential of meroplankton. One study conducted in the Vostok Bay region in Russia, demonstrated that even in the presence of industrial pollutants, most species of meroplankton were able to proliferate almost unaffected. The authors of this study attribute these findings to the fact that meroplankton are transported by ocean currents generally from cleaner open waters inshore. Furthermore, the same study also concluded that even in heavily polluted areas, meroplankton populations were able to reestablish if pollution was brought under control and sufficient time was allowed to pass. However, the rate of recolonization was demonstrated to be notably slow, on average taking about 10 years before the abundance and diversity of meroplankton returned to its original levels. This is in part due to the slow nature of detoxification of benthic sediments, which retain much of the heavy metal pollution.

== Meroplankton and climate change ==
A study conducted in the North Sea between 1958 and 2005, collected samples of meroplankton using a CPR survey. These samples consisted of larval echinoderms, decapods, bivalves, cirripedes, and ectoprocts. Meroplankton abundance as well as PCI levels (amount of chlorophyll in each sample in relation to sea surface temperature) were examined. Researchers concluded that echinoderm larvae increased in abundance throughout the study, with the largest increase occurring in the Northern and Central regions. Decapod larvae were found to increase in abundance as well, and were found to appear earlier in the year. Bivalve larvae showed an overall decline in abundance. It was also concluded that PCI levels increased throughout the study, particularly during the summer months. It was determined that climate, particularly sea surface temperature, drives meroplankton abundance. Warmer sea surface temperature shortens developmental time of the larvae, increasing their survival rate.

== See also ==
- Plankton
- Holoplankton
- Ichthyoplankton
- Zooplankton
- Nekton

== Sources ==
- Meroplankton (Australian Museum)
