= Cyclomorphosis =

Cyclomorphosis (also known as seasonal polyphenism) is the name given to the occurrence of cyclic or seasonal changes in the phenotype of an organism through successive generations.

In species undergoing cyclomorphosis, physiological characteristics and development cycles of individuals being born depend on the time of the year at which they are conceived.

It occurs in small aquatic invertebrates that reproduce by parthenogenesis and give rise to several generations annually. It occurs especially in marine planktonic animals, and is thought to be caused by the epigenetic effect of environmental cues on the organism, thereby altering the course of their development.
