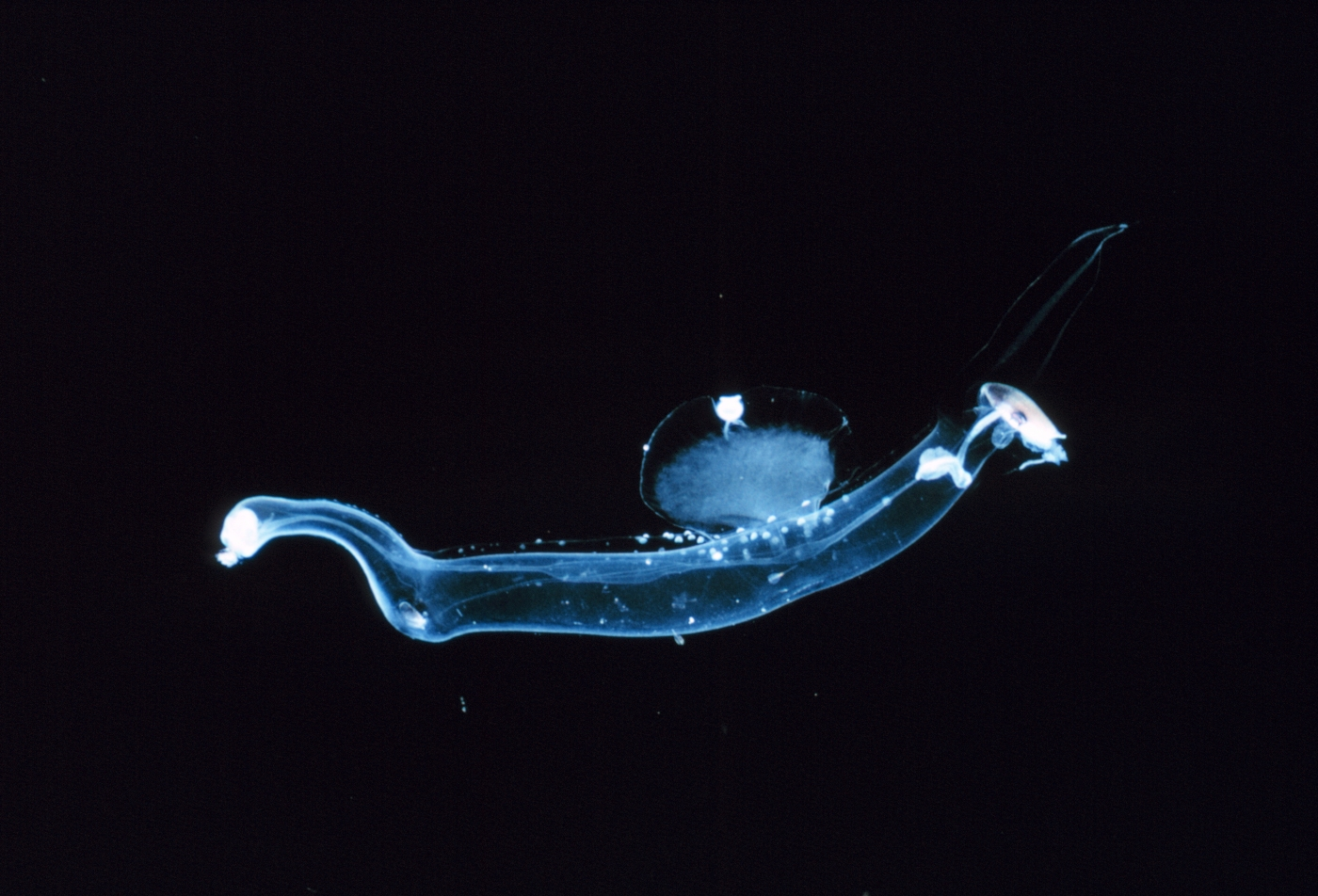
- A pterotracheid

Scientific classification
- Kingdom: Animalia
- Phylum: Mollusca
- Class: Gastropoda
- Subclass: Caenogastropoda
- Order: Littorinimorpha
- Superfamily: Pterotracheoidea; Rafinesque, 1814

Families
- See text

Synonyms
- Heteropoda Lamarck, 1812; Carinarioidea de Blainville, 1818

= Pterotracheoidea =

Superfamily of molluscs

The Pterotracheoidea is, according to the Taxonomy of the Gastropoda (Bouchet & Rocroi, 2005), a taxonomic superfamily of sea snails or sea slugs, marine gastropod molluscs in the order Littorinimorpha. They are commonly called heteropods or sea elephants.

== Taxonomy ==
According to the World Register of Marine Species, this superfamily comprises five families, two of which are extinct:

- Atlantidae Rang, 1829
- †Bellerophinidae Destombes, 1984
- Carinariidae Blainville, 1818
- †Coelodiscidae Gründel & Nützel, 2013
- Pterotracheidae Rafinesque, 1814

== Habitat ==
These holoplanktonic snails are found floating or swimming in tropical to subtropical open oceans and seas at a depth of maximum 200 to 300 m

== Anatomy ==
These snails have adapted themselves to a pelagic living :

- a transparent body and shell
- the foot has evolved into a swimming fin that produces motion through undulation.
- the proboscis is mobile and can be extended giving it a trunk-like appearance (giving rise to their common name : sea elephants).

The taenioglossate radula, situated at the tip of the proboscis, can be protruded to capture the prey.

They have paired, large spherical eyes, contained in a gelatinous mass, that they use to locate their prey. As the body is transparent, one can easily see the internal organs and the statocysts with its statoliths (an organ that tells the animal whether it is upside down or not). The swimming fin of the foot has a ventral or posteroventral sucker. This sucker has grown larger in the family Atlantidae where it serves to hold the prey. The fin sucker is only present in male snails of the Pterotracheidae.

The body size varies from microscopic (Atlantidae) to macroscopic (Carinariidae and Pterotracheidae). Fertilized eggs are laid in mucous strings that hatch after a few days into free swimming veliger larvae (except in Firoloida desmaresti where the eggs remain attached in a tubular filament to the female body).

All the heteropods float or swim with their ventral part upward. The atlantids are negatively buoyant, while the others have neutral buoyancy.

== Shell ==
These snails all have a coiled shell present in their larval stage. But the shell is no longer present in the Pterotracheidae after metamorphosis. The keel (sharp ridge on a whorl of the shell) of the adult shell extends outwards in the Atlantidae and anteriorly in Carinariidae. The shell is calcareous in the Carinariidae. In the Atlantidae, however, the shell and the keel can be calcareous (genus Atlanta) or the shell calcareous and its keel composed of conchiolin (genus Protatlanta), or the shell composed exclusively of conchiolin (genus Oxygyrus). Only the Atlantidae can retract into their shell.
