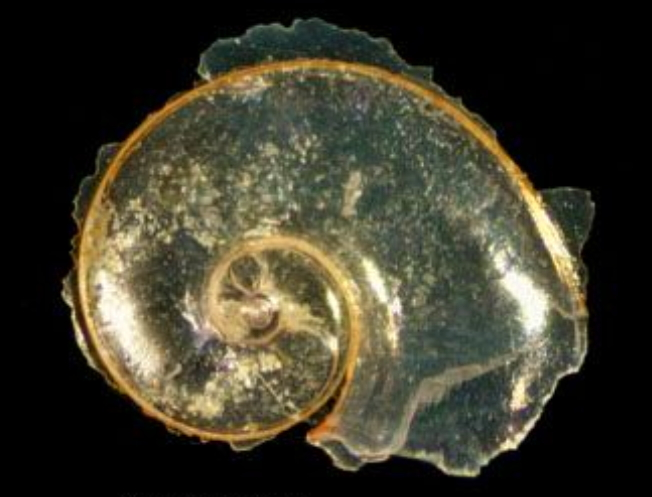
- Atlanta peronii

Scientific classification
- Kingdom: Animalia
- Phylum: Mollusca
- Class: Gastropoda
- Subclass: Caenogastropoda
- Order: Littorinimorpha
- Family: Atlantidae
- Genus: Atlanta
- Species: A. peronii

Binomial name
- Atlanta peronii Lesueur, 1817

Synonyms
- Atlanta costae Mandralisca, 1840; Atlanta keraudrenii Lesueur, 1817; Atlanta peroni Lesueur, 1817(misspelt); Atlanta steindachneri Oberwimmer, 1898; Brownia candei (A. d'Orbigny, 1841) junior subjective synonym; Helicophlegma candei A. d'Orbigny, 1841 (original combination); Ladas planorboides Forbes, 1844; Oxygyrus keraudrenii (Lesueur, 1817); Schizotrochus palaeomphaloides F. Nordsieck, 1973; Steira lamanoni Eschscholtz, 1825 ·

= Atlanta peronii =

Species of gastropod

Atlanta peronii is a species of sea snail, a holoplanktonic marine gastropod mollusk in the family Atlantidae, as well as its typetaxon.

== Distribution ==
This species is seen in South Korea, South and East China Sea region of Mainland China, as well as ocean regions around Taiwan.

== Description ==
The maximum recorded shell length is 11 mm.

(Described in Latin as Atlanta keraudrenii) The shell is glassy-membranous, nearly circular, symmetrical, and coiled inward. It is umbilicated on both sides, broadly keeled, extremely thin, and translucent. There are three whorls, which are convex and smooth, and they remain clearly visible within the umbilicus on either side. The body whorl is furnished with a broad keel on the upper side and is slightly keeled on the lower side. The aperture is large and heart-shaped, with a small channel or groove at the front; the peristome (the lip of the shell) is wavy and sharp.

The operculum is glassy, somewhat triangular, thin, translucent, and marked with fine lines (striated).

== Habitat ==
holoplanktonic, although habitat in sand-based shallow sea, the maximum recorded depth is 3338 m.
