= Protoconch =

Embryonic or larval shell of some molluscs

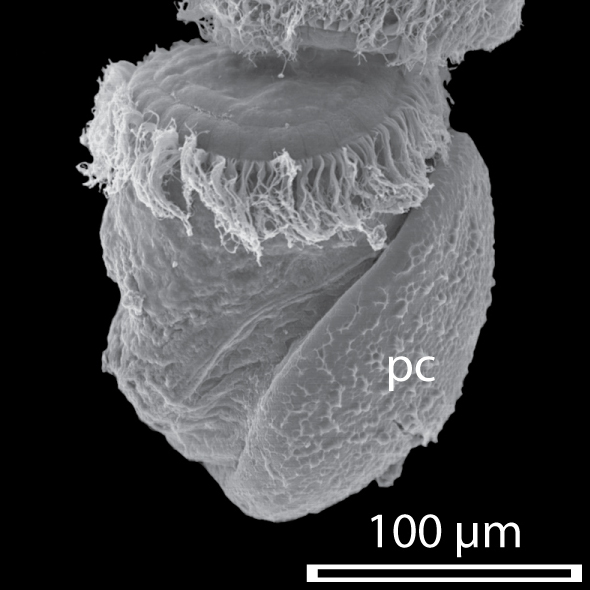
An SEM image of the trochophore of Haliotis asinina 11 hours post fertilization, with calcified protoconch (pc) prior to torsion.

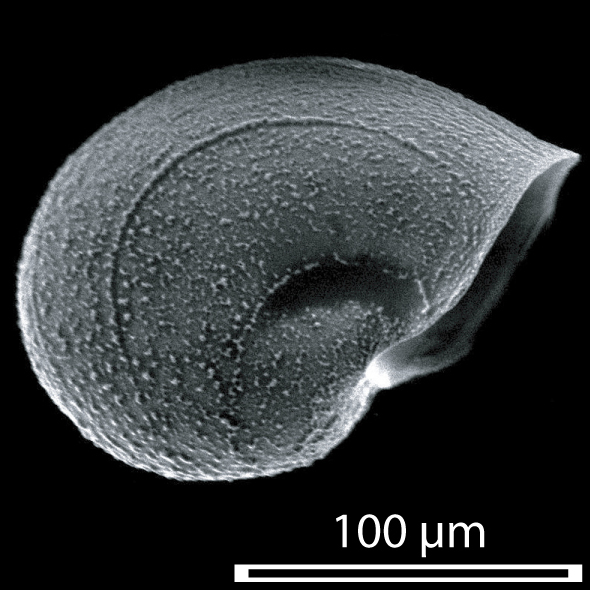
Protoconch of Haliotis asinina when the torsion is complete.

A protoconch (meaning first or earliest or original shell of a gastropod) is an embryonic or larval shell which occurs in some classes of molluscs, e.g., the initial chamber of an ammonite or the larval shell of a gastropod. In older texts it is also called "nucleus". The protoconch may sometimes consist of several whorls, but when this is the case, the whorls show no growth lines.

The whorls of the shell, which are formed after the protoconch, are known as the teleoconch. The teleoconch starts forming when the larval gastropod becomes a juvenile, and the protoconch may dissolve. Quite often there is a visible line of demarcation where the protoconch ends and the teleoconch begins, and there may be a noticeable change in sculpture, or a sudden appearance of sculpture at that point.

In some gastropod groups (such as the Architectonicidae), the teleoconch whorls spiral in the opposite direction to the protoconch. In those cases, the shell is called heterostrophic.

In species which have a veliger or swimming larval stage which hatches out of egg capsules, there are two parts to the protoconch. The first part of the protoconch (which is formed within the embryonic egg capsule) is called protoconch 1, while the part that is formed after the larva has hatched is called protoconch 2. There is often a different sculpture or ornamentation on protoconch 1 compared with protoconch 2, and this can be distinguished under the microscope.

The structure of the protoconch has been widely used as a discriminating feature in gastropod systematics. For example, certain nudibranches have an 'inflated' protoconch, which does not grow but houses the growing soft tissues of the larva, and this distinguishes them from other gastropods.

The homologous structure in bivalves (clams) is called the prodissoconch.

== Examples ==
Comparison of the whole shell and the protoconch of Atlanta lesueurii:

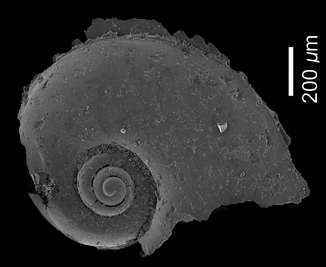
Apical view of the whole shell.

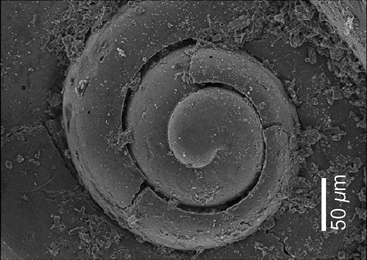
Detail of apical view of the same shell showing clearly visible protoconch, that has 2¼ whorls

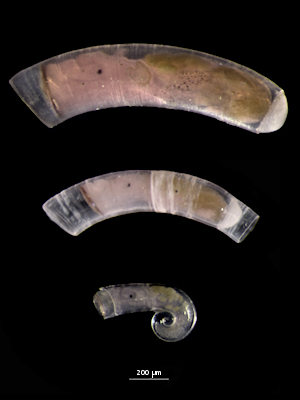
Growth series of Caecum glabrum showing protoconch in bottom image.
