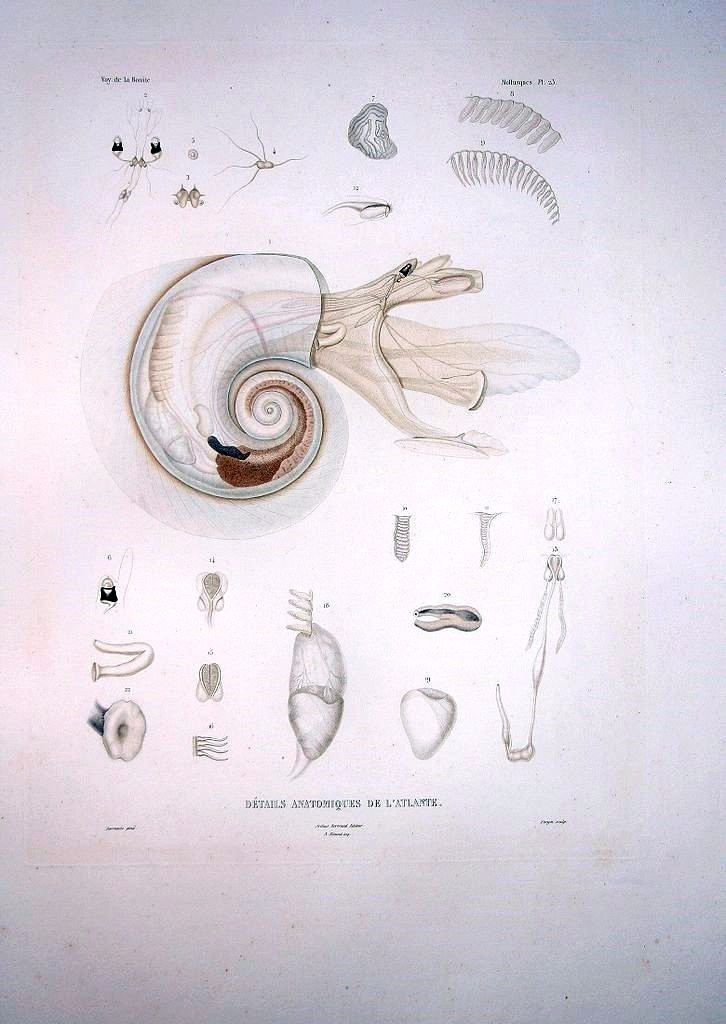
- Drawing of Atlanta sp.

Scientific classification
- Kingdom: Animalia
- Phylum: Mollusca
- Class: Gastropoda
- Subclass: Caenogastropoda
- Order: Littorinimorpha
- Superfamily: Pterotracheoidea
- Family: Atlantidae; Rang, 1829

Type genus
- Atlanta Lesueur, 1817

Genera
- See text

= Atlantidae =

Atlantidae Temporal range: Cretaceous–Recent Cretaceous-Recent

Family of gastropods

Atlantidae is a family of sea snails, holoplanktonic gastropod molluscs in the clade Littorinimorpha.

According to taxonomy of the Gastropoda by Bouchet & Rocroi (2005) the family Atlantidae has no subfamilies.

== Description ==
The Atlantidae is a group of holoplanktonic gastropods, which all demonstrate a strong adaptation to pelagic life, in the form of a lenticular, laterally flattened, aragonitic shell, the surface of which is further enlarged by the presence of a wide, and very thin and fragile, double-walled keel. The apex is on the right side of the shell, the umbilicus on the left. For the living animal the enlargement of the shell's surface serves 'to increase stabilization during swimming and sinking'. This phenomenon results in the occurrence of superficially very similar adult shells in separate species, whereas the larval shells may be utterly different.

Their body size is microscopic with a shell diameter of less than 1 cm. The foot has evolved into a muscular swimming fin. Their swimming fin extends anteriorly beneath their head. They swim with their ventral part upward through undulation of their swimming fin.

The shell is coiled dextrally (i.e. clockwise). The thin, double-walled keel of the shell extends outward from the last shell whorl. The apex of the shell is found on the right side, the umbilicus on the left side. The shell and keel can be calcareous (genus Atlanta), or composed exclusively of conchiolin (genus Oxygyrus), or the shell can be calcareous and its keel composed of conchiolin (genus Protatlanta). The snails of this family can retract into their shell and close it off with a cartilaginous, flexible operculum.

== Genera ==
Genera in the family Atlantidae include:

- Atlanta Lesueur, 1817 - type genus
- Oxygyrus Benson, 1835 - monospecific, it has only one species Oxygyrus keraudrenii (Lesueur, 1817)
- Protatlanta Tesch, 1908 - monospecific in extant species; a few fossil species have been described
- † Bellerophina d'Orbigny, 1843
- † Eoatlanta Cossmann, 1888
- † Mioatlanta di Geronimo, 1974

Recent Atlantidae, in the present concept, comprise three genera, two of which, Oxygyrus Benson, 1835, and Protatlanta Tesch, 1908, are considered monospecific. In Protatlanta, however, a few additional fossil species have been described. Both genera are characterised by partially uncalcified (conchiolin) shell portions. Additional fossil genera considered to belong in the Atlantidae are Bellerophina d'Orbigny, 1843 (Cretaceous), Eoatlanta Cossmann, 1888 (Paleocene-Eocene) and Mioatlanta di Geronimo, 1974 (Miocene). Only few Atlanta species are known from the fossil record, the oldest one being Atlanta arenularia Gougerot & Braillon, 1965 is from the Bartonian of the Paris Basin, which differs considerably from typical Atlanta by its cornucopia shape.

== Ecology ==
Atlantids are negatively buoyant. During the day, they have to swim to maintain their position. At night they secrete strands of buoyant mucus to which they attach themselves. They are active predator locating their prey visually.
