= Holoplankton =

Organisms planktic for their entire life

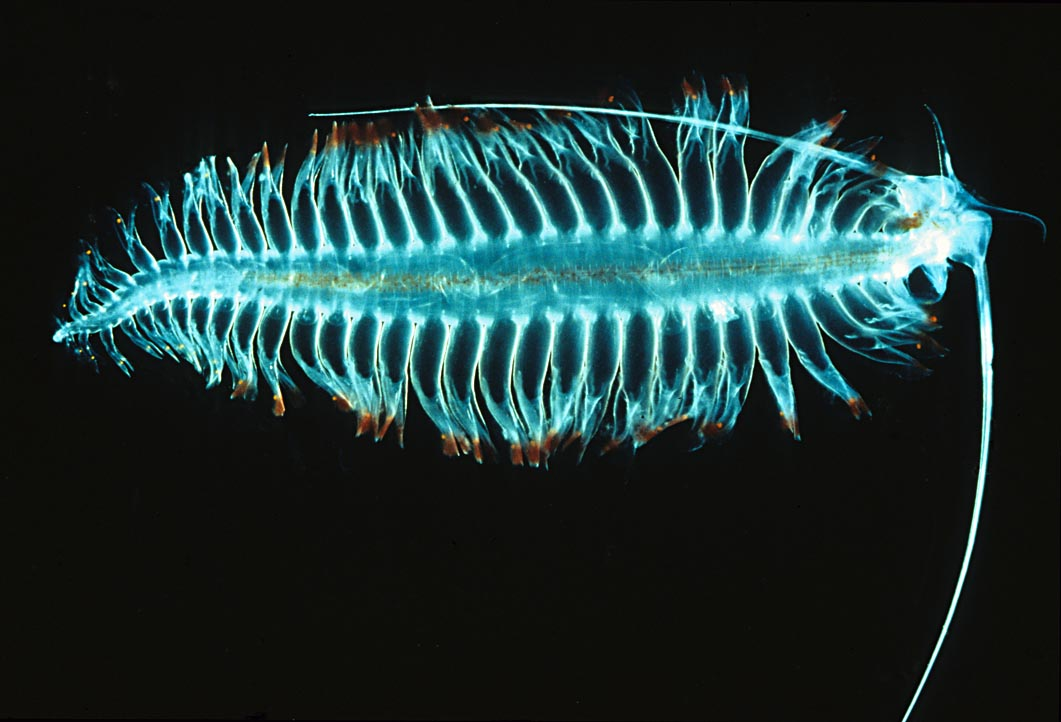
Tomopteris, a holoplanktic polychaete worm with an unusual yellow bioluminescence that emanates from its parapodia

Holoplankton are organisms that are planktic (they live in the water column and cannot swim against a current) for their entire life cycle. Holoplankton can be contrasted with meroplankton, which are planktic organisms that spend part of their life cycle in the benthic zone. Examples of holoplankton include some diatoms, radiolarians, some dinoflagellates, foraminifera, amphipods, krill, copepods, and salps, as well as some gastropod mollusk species. Holoplankton dwell in the pelagic zone as opposed to the benthic zone. Holoplankton include both phytoplankton and zooplankton and vary in size. The most common plankton are protists.

== Reproduction ==
Holoplankton have unique traits that make reproduction in the water column possible. Both sexual and asexual reproduction are used depending on the type of plankton. Some invertebrate holoplankton release sperm into the water column which are then taken up by the females for fertilization. Other species release both sperm and egg to increase the likelihood of fertilization. Environmental, mechanical, or chemical cues can all trigger this release.

Diatoms are single celled phytoplankton that can occur as individuals or as long chains. They can reproduce sexually and asexually. Diatoms are important oxygen producers and are usually the first step in the food chain.

Copepods are small holoplanktonic crustaceans that swim using their hind legs and antennae.

== Defenses ==
Because of their small size and sluggish swimming abilities, holoplanktonic species have made certain specialized adaptations and in some cases are equipped with special defenses. Adaptations include flat bodies, lateral spines, oil droplets, floats filled with gases, sheaths made of gel-like substances, and ion replacement.

Zooplankton have adapted by developing transparent bodies, bright colors, bad tastes and cyclomorphosis (seasonal changes in body shape). When predators release a chemical in the water to signal zooplankton; cyclomorphosis allows holoplankton to increase their spines and protective shields. Studies have shown that although small in size certain gelatinous zooplankton are rich in protein and lipid. Many holoplankton seem to have very little visible defense mechanisms; therefore, it is hypothesized that a chemical defense may be possible. Pelagic cnidarians (jellyfish and related species) have nematocysts on their tentacles that eject a coiled microscopic thread very rapidly. These threads penetrate the surface of their target and release a series of complicated, biologically advanced venoms. Their stings can be very dangerous, due in part to the number of vital systems affected.

== Sexual holoplankton ==
Copepods

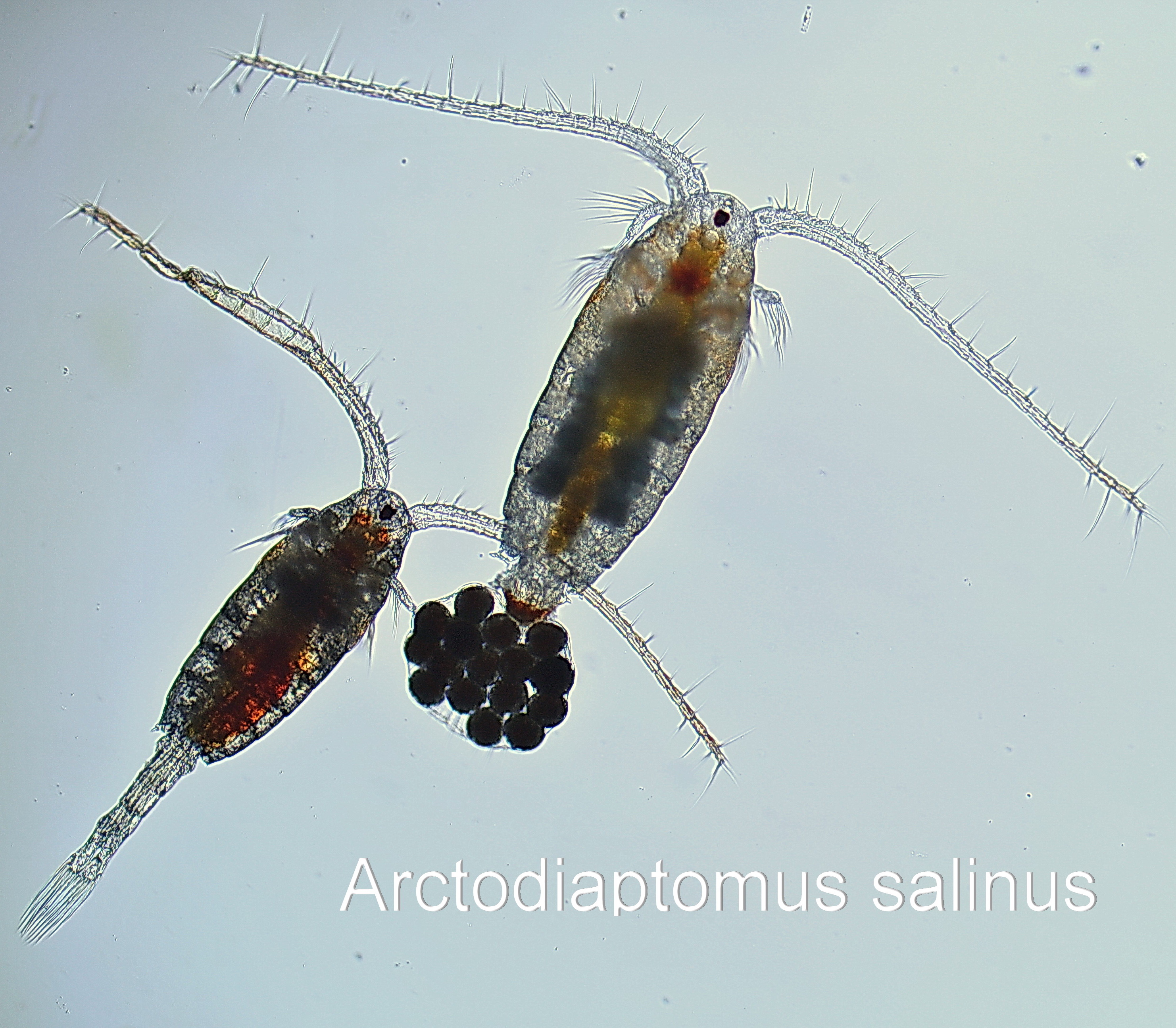
Male and female copepod

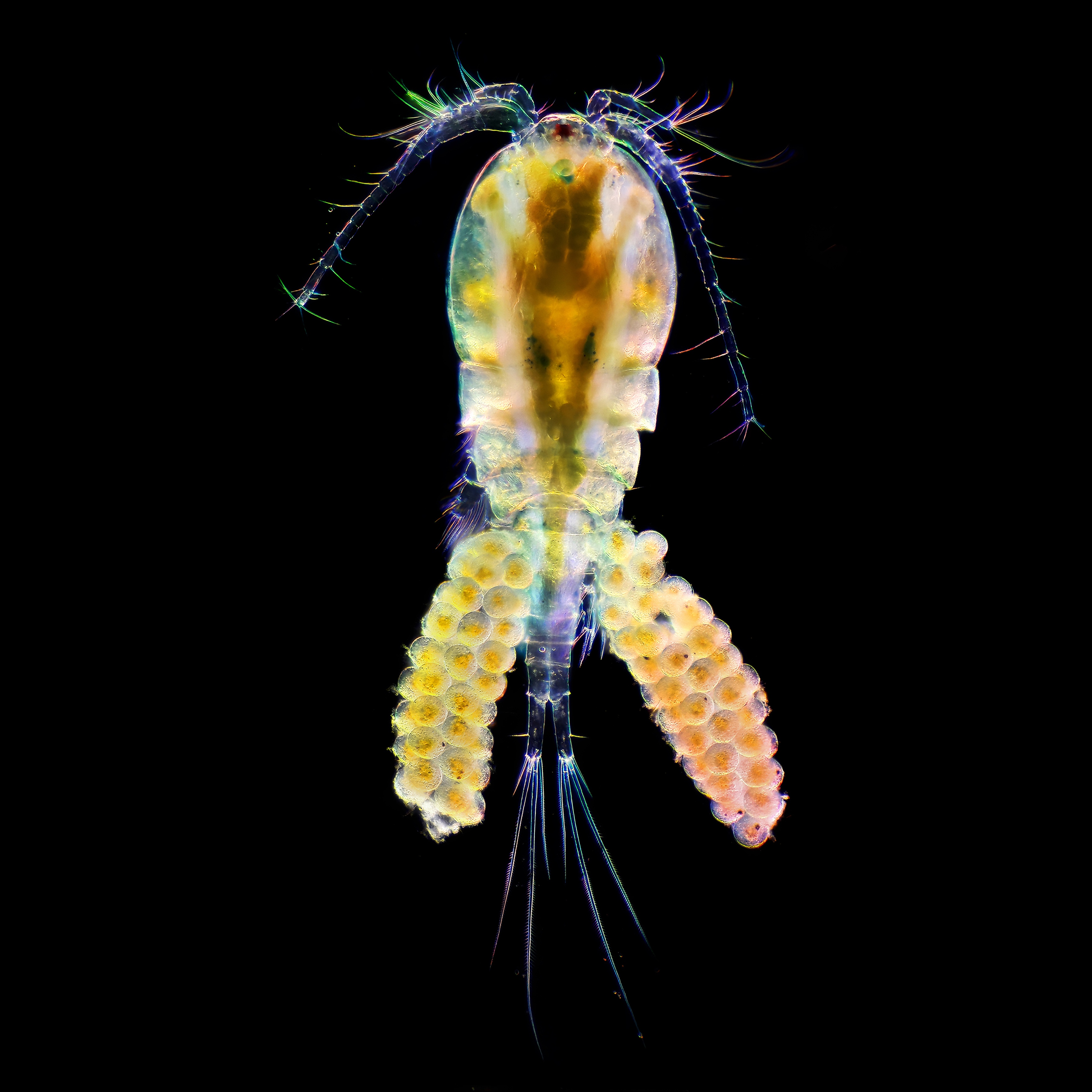
Female copepod with eggs

- Copepod

== See also ==
- Plankton
- Meroplankton

== Sources ==
Australian Museum Online
