= Borromée =

French illustrator and engraver

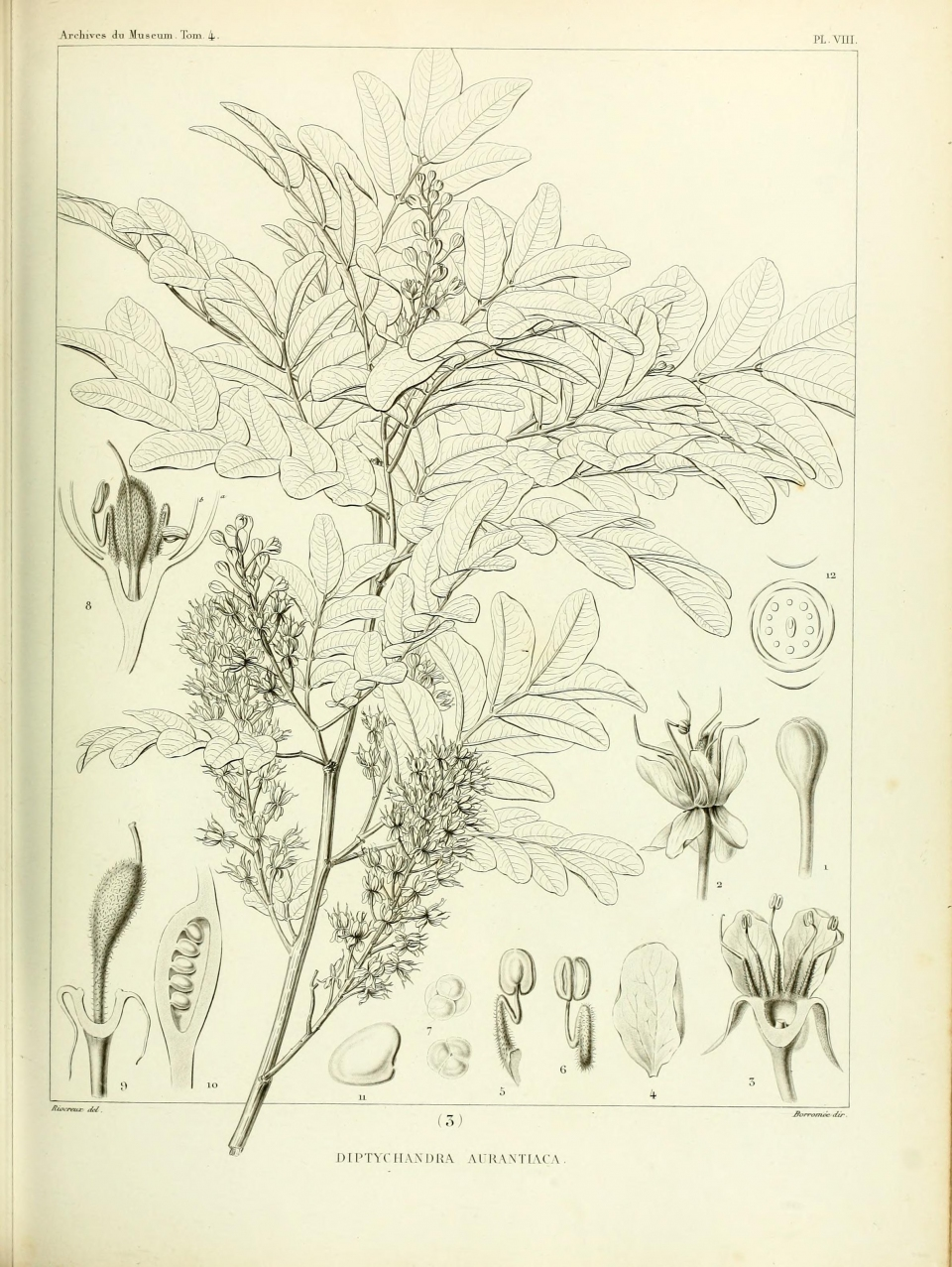
Diptychandra aurantiaca Tul.

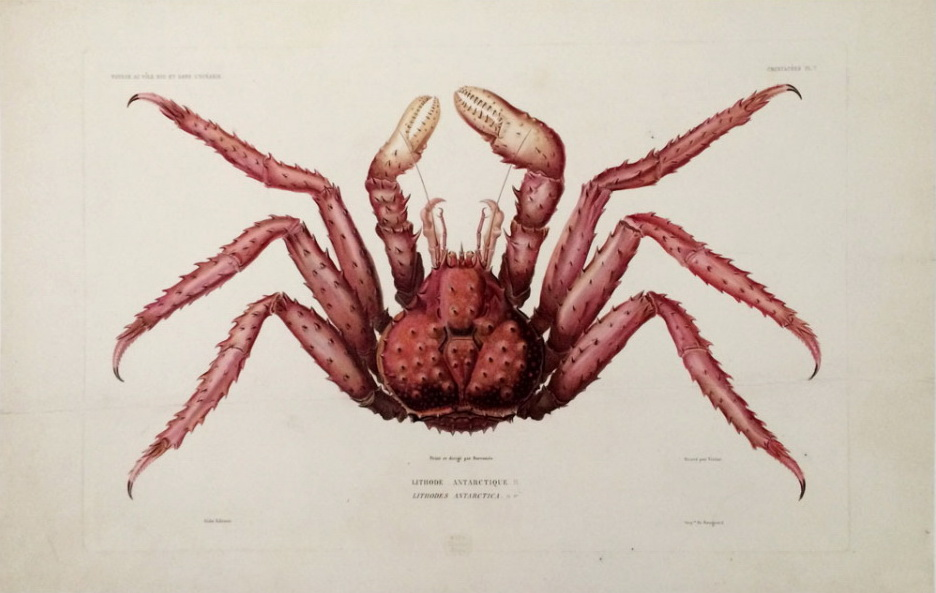
Lithodes santolla (Molina, 1782)

Borromée was a French natural history and botanical illustrator and engraver during the 1700s and 1800s.

== Published works ==
Borromée was responsible for illustrating works such as

- Charles Athanase Walckenaer - Histoire naturelle des insectes. Aptères (1837-1847)
- René Primevère Lesson - Histoire naturelle des zoophytes. Acalèphes (1843)
- Jean Théodore Lacordaire - Introduction à l'entomologie : comprenant les principes généraux de l'anatomie et de la physiologie des insectes, des détails sur leurs murs et un résumé des principaux systèmes de classification proposés jusqu'à ce jour pour ces animaux (1834-1838)
- Auguste Nicolas Vaillant - Voyage autour du monde : exécuté pendant les années 1836 et 1837 sur la corvette la Bonite (1840-1866)
