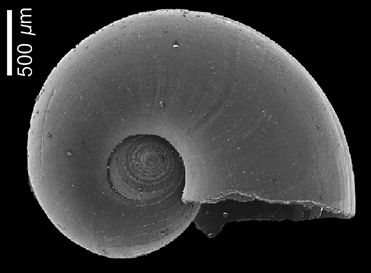
- Apical view of a shell of Protatlanta rotundata from the Pliocene of the Philippines

Scientific classification
- Kingdom: Animalia
- Phylum: Mollusca
- Class: Gastropoda
- Subclass: Caenogastropoda
- Order: Littorinimorpha
- Family: Atlantidae
- Genus: Protatlanta
- Species: P. rotundata

Binomial name
- Protatlanta rotundata (Gabb, 1873)

Synonyms
- Atlanta rotundata Gabb, 1873

= Protatlanta rotundata =

Protatlanta rotundata Temporal range: Miocene-Early Pleistocene

Extinct species of gastropod

Protatlanta rotundata is an extinct species of sea snail, a holoplanktonic marine gastropod mollusk in the family Atlantidae.

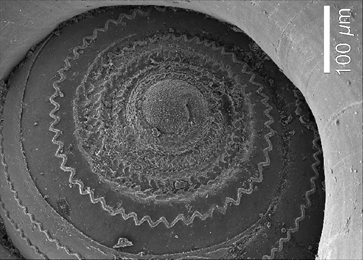
Apical view of a protoconch of Protatlanta rotundata from the Pliocene

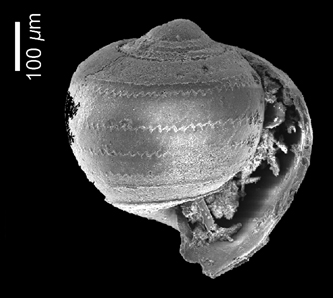
Apertural view of a protoconch of Protatlanta rotundata from the Pliocene

== Description ==
The width of the shell can reach up to 10 mm. In the largest specimen there are almost two teleoconch whorls that initially attach very high onto the protoconch, with the result that the larval shell seems to be embedded rather obliquely within the younger whorls. The diameter of the teleoconch increases rapidly, the result being a shell that strongly resembles Planorbarius (but, of course, dextral). The surface of these younger whorls bears flexuous growth lines, and a dense and very fine, somewhat irregular spiral striation, only visible where light reflects on the shell. On the body whorl a distinct peripheral belt is present on which the growth lines are strongly bent backward, indicating a deep sinus in the apertural margin.

The larval shell is globular, about as wide as high and has approximately five whorls which attach very high onto the preceding whorl. In apical view, therefore, the second and third whorls are very narrow, even much narrower than the nucleus and first whorl of the protoconch. The fifth whorl gradually attaches somewhat lower on the penultimate whorl. All protoconch whorls have a number of very narrow, distant and thread-like spiral lirae with a zigzag structure, just one of which remains visible between the upper and lower sutures. One spiral at the place of the suture and a further one on the base of the protoconch are somewhat stronger developed, but do not or only faintly show the zigzag structure. The boundary with the teleoconch is indicated by a rather sudden disappearance of the ornament.

Protatlanta rotundata differs considerably from the type of the genus, Protatlanta souleyeti. Not only does the adult shell in Protatlanta rotundata reach a diameter that is roughly five times that of Protatlanta souleyeti, but the morphology of its protoconch and the shape of the fully grown shell are utterly different. Also, as both species occur together in the Pangasinan samples, Protatlanta rotundata can certainly not be considered to be the ancestor species. The presence of a subperipheral belt much the same as in Protatlanta souleyeti, on the other hand, demonstrates that a conchiolin keel has been present in this species.

== Distribution ==
Protatlanta rotundata was originally described from the (Late?) Miocene of the Dominican Republic and has a wide horizontal and vertical distribution; Langhian-Serravallian (Italy, Malta, Cyprus; RGM collections), Tortonian (Sicily), Piacenzian (Spain, Jamaica, Philippines), Pliocene of Anda, Pangasinan, Luzon, Philippines and ‘Middle Pliocene-Early Pleistocene’ (Japan).
