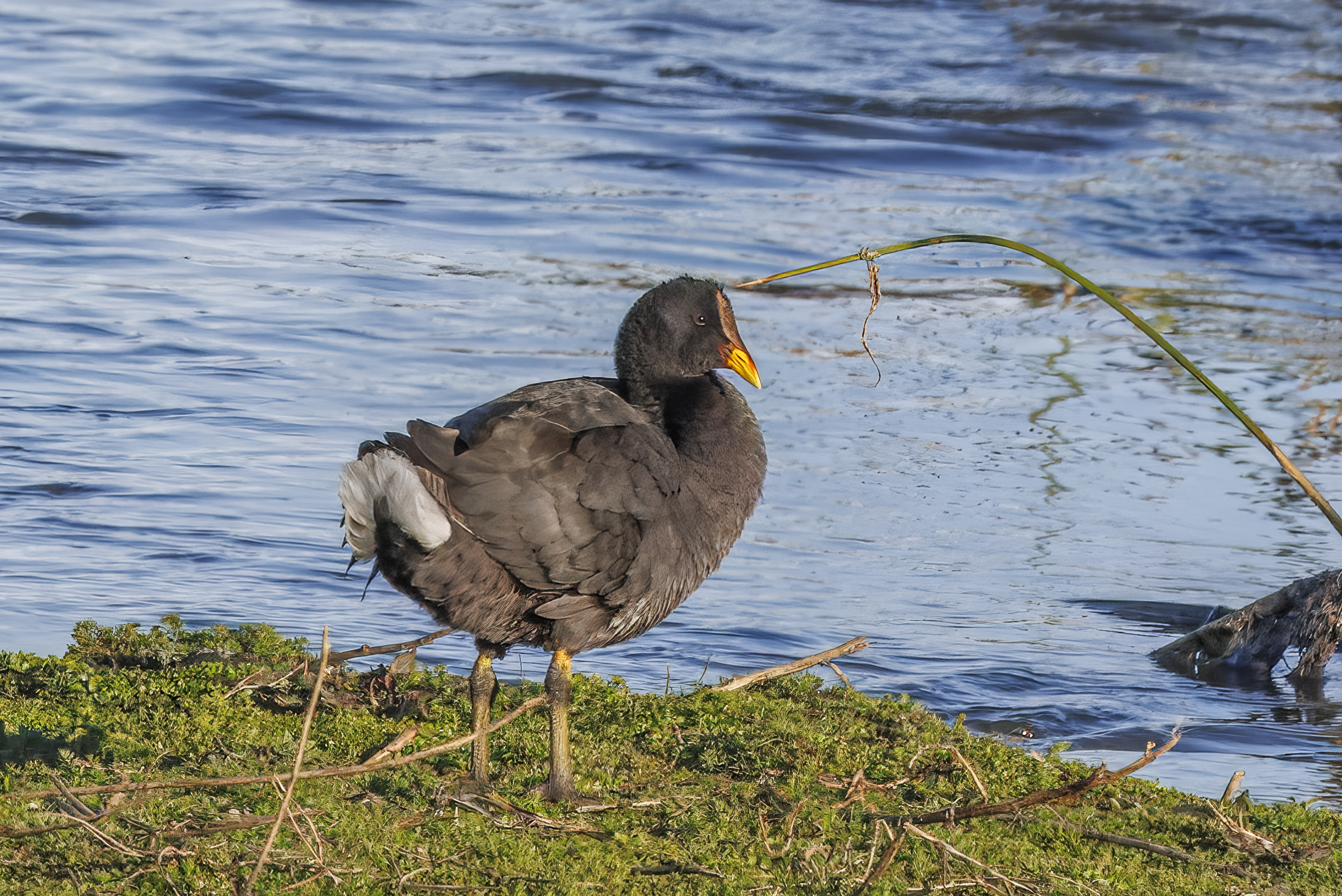
- in Argentina

Conservation status
- Least Concern (IUCN 3.1)

Scientific classification
- Kingdom: Animalia
- Phylum: Chordata
- Class: Aves
- Order: Gruiformes
- Family: Rallidae
- Genus: Fulica
- Species: F. rufifrons

Binomial name
- Fulica rufifrons Philippi & Landbeck, 1861

= Red-fronted coot =

Red-fronted coot Temporal range: Late Pleistocene–present

Species of bird

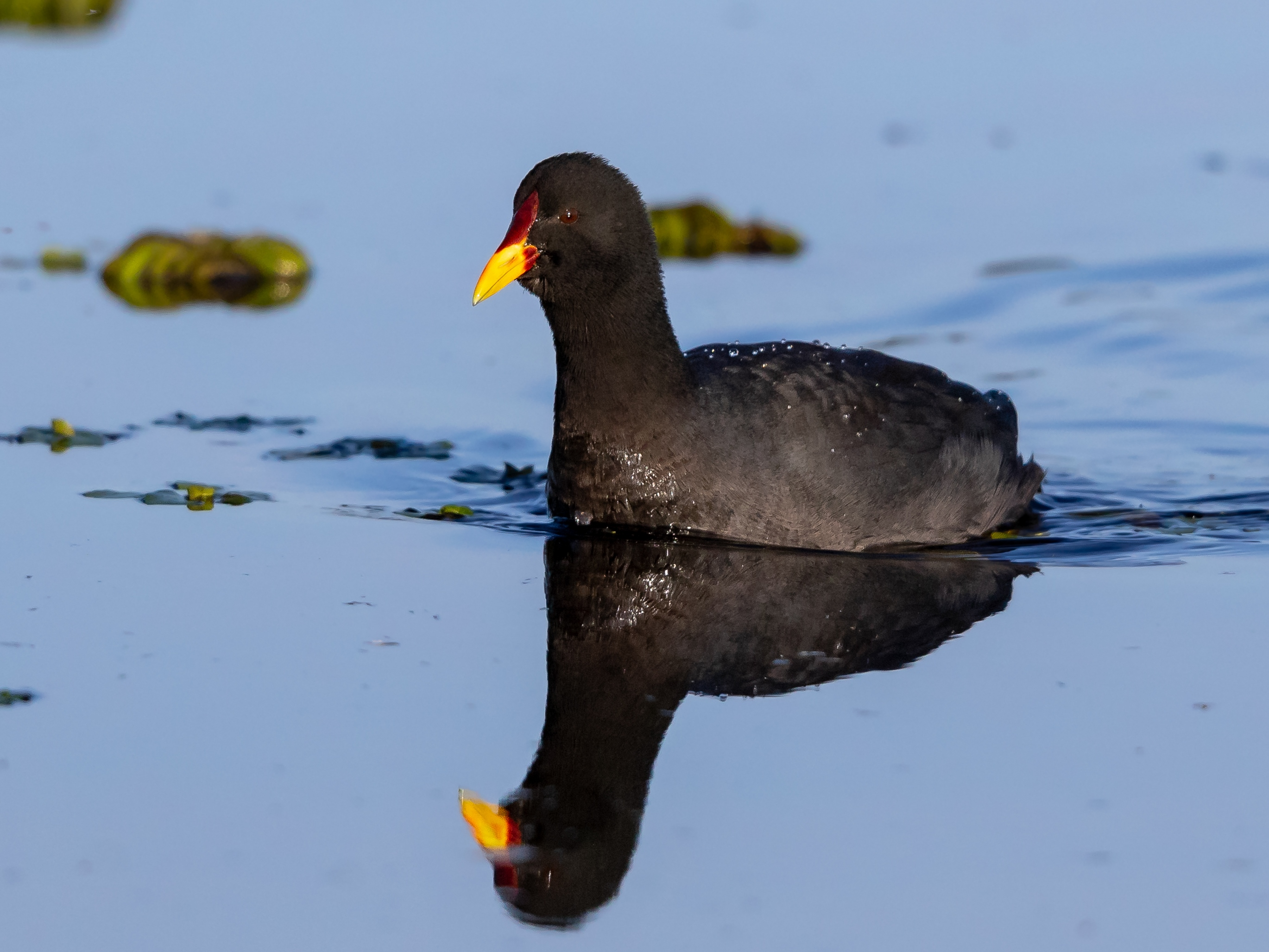
in Uruguay

The red-fronted coot (Fulica rufifrons) is a species of bird in subfamily Rallinae of family Rallidae, the rails, gallinules, and coots. It is found in Argentina, Bolivia, Brazil, Chile, Peru, and Uruguay.

== Taxonomy and systematics ==
The red-fronted coot is monotypic.

== Description ==
The red-fronted coot is 38 to 43 cm (15 to 17 in) long. Male specimens can weigh between 685 and 735 g (24 and 26 oz) and females can weigh around 550 g (19 oz). The sexes are alike. Adults have a yellow bill, a dark chestnut-red frontal shield, and olive legs and feet. Unique among coots, their feet are not lobed. Their plumage is almost entirely dark slate gray except for white undertail coverts. Juveniles have a blackish bill, white spots on the throat, and gray-brown plumage with the same white undertail coverts as adults.

== Distribution and habitat ==
The red-fronted coot is found coastally from southern Peru to central Chile, in at least one site in Bolivia, and from southeastern Brazil south through Uruguay to east central Argentina. It has also occurred as a vagrant in Paraguay and the Falkland Islands, though the last sighting at the latter location was in 1924. Clements extends its range to Tierra del Fuego. Fossils of this species are known from the Laguna de Tagua Tagua formation of Chile.

The red-fronted coot is primarily a bird of the lowlands, ordinarily ranging from sea level to 800 m (2,600 ft), but it occurs casually as high as 2,100 m (6,900 ft) in Argentina and is regularly found at 3,700 m (12,100 ft) at Alalay Lake, Bolivia. It inhabits the shallows of semi-open marshes and reedy lakes, especially those with floating vegetation such as duckweed.

== Behavior ==
=== Movement ===
No regular movements of the red-fronted coot have been documented. However, sightings of vagrants outside its usual range suggest at least some wandering or dispersal. It appears to be only a winter inhabitant in the northern part of its Brazilian range.

=== Feeding ===
The red-fronted coot feeds mostly on the surface, pecking at vegetation, though it also dives for submerged food. In addition, it is known to graze near its usual marshes when they seasonally dry. It usually feeds in small flocks that sometimes include red-gartered coots (F. armillata).

=== Breeding ===
The red-fronted coot is monogamous. Its egg-laying season varies geographically, being September and October in Chile, May to November in Argentina, and September to January in Peru. It makes a nest of plant material low to the water in floating or emergent vegetation. Clutches average five to six eggs but range from two to nine. The black-headed duck (Heteronetta atricapilla) is a significant nest parasite.

=== Vocalization ===
The red-fronted coot makes a "long, chattering series of calls, described as 'togo togo togo..., cu cu cu..., puhúh puhúh puhúh...', etc." It also has a "tuc" alarm call.

== Conservation status ==
The IUCN has assessed the red-fronted coot as being of Least Concern. It has a large range, and though its population size is not known it is believed to be stable. No immediate threats have been identified. It is considered "not uncommon" in much of its range and abundant in marshes on the Pampas.
