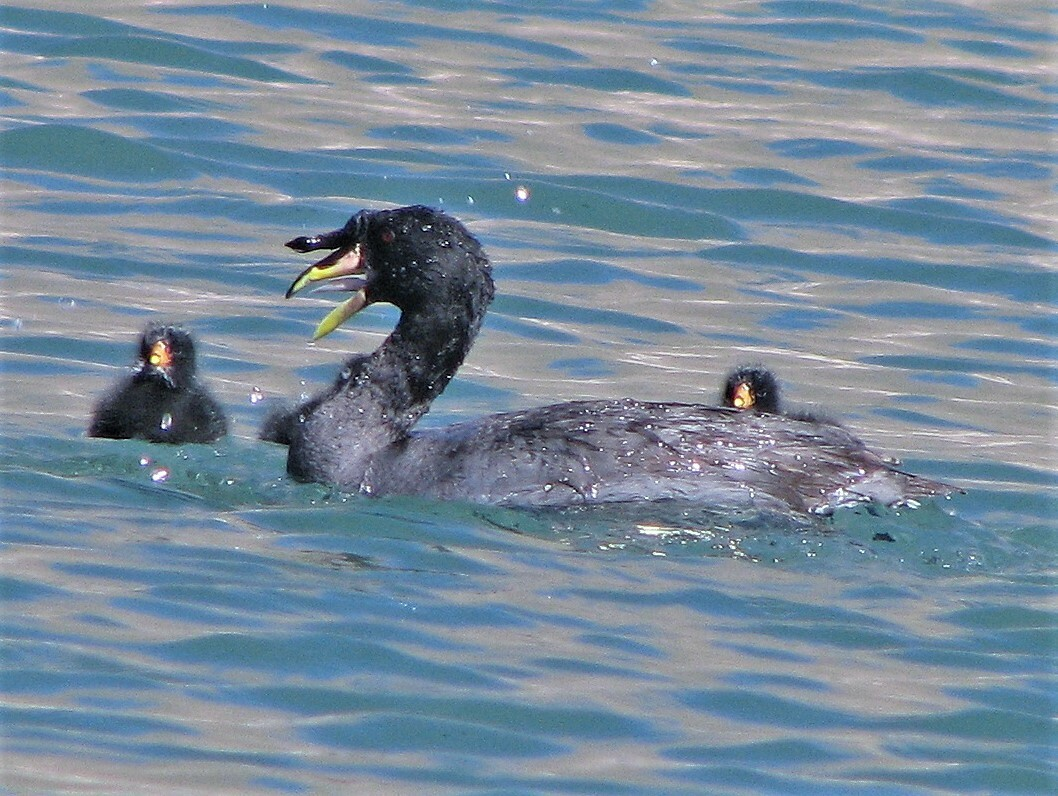
- adult with chicks in Argentina

Conservation status
- Near Threatened (IUCN 3.1)

Scientific classification
- Kingdom: Animalia
- Phylum: Chordata
- Class: Aves
- Order: Gruiformes
- Family: Rallidae
- Genus: Fulica
- Species: F. cornuta

Binomial name
- Fulica cornuta Bonaparte, 1853

= Horned coot =

Species of bird

The horned coot (Fulica cornuta) is a species of bird found in the Andes of South America. It was described by Bonaparte in 1853 based on a specimen collected in Bolivia. For a long time it was known only from the type specimen.

== Description ==
Horned coot males average a little larger than the female. With a total length of 46–62 cm (18–24 in) and a reported body mass from 1.6–2.29 kg (3.5–5.0 lb), it averages slightly smaller than the related giant coot as the second largest coot and the third largest extant species of rail.

While most coots have a horny shield on the forehead, the horned coot has three wattles in both sexes. The central wattle is large and may possibly be erectile. The three wattles terminate in tufts of filoplumes. At the base of the beak and below the wattle is a fleshy caruncle which is whitish. The bill is olive yellow, brightening to dull orange towards the base. Unlike the giant coot, the legs of the horned coot are dull greenish.

Illustration of the horned coot (Some old illustrations show erect wattles, but these are held flat along the culmen of the bill, with only the brush-like tip pointing outwards).

== Breeding ==
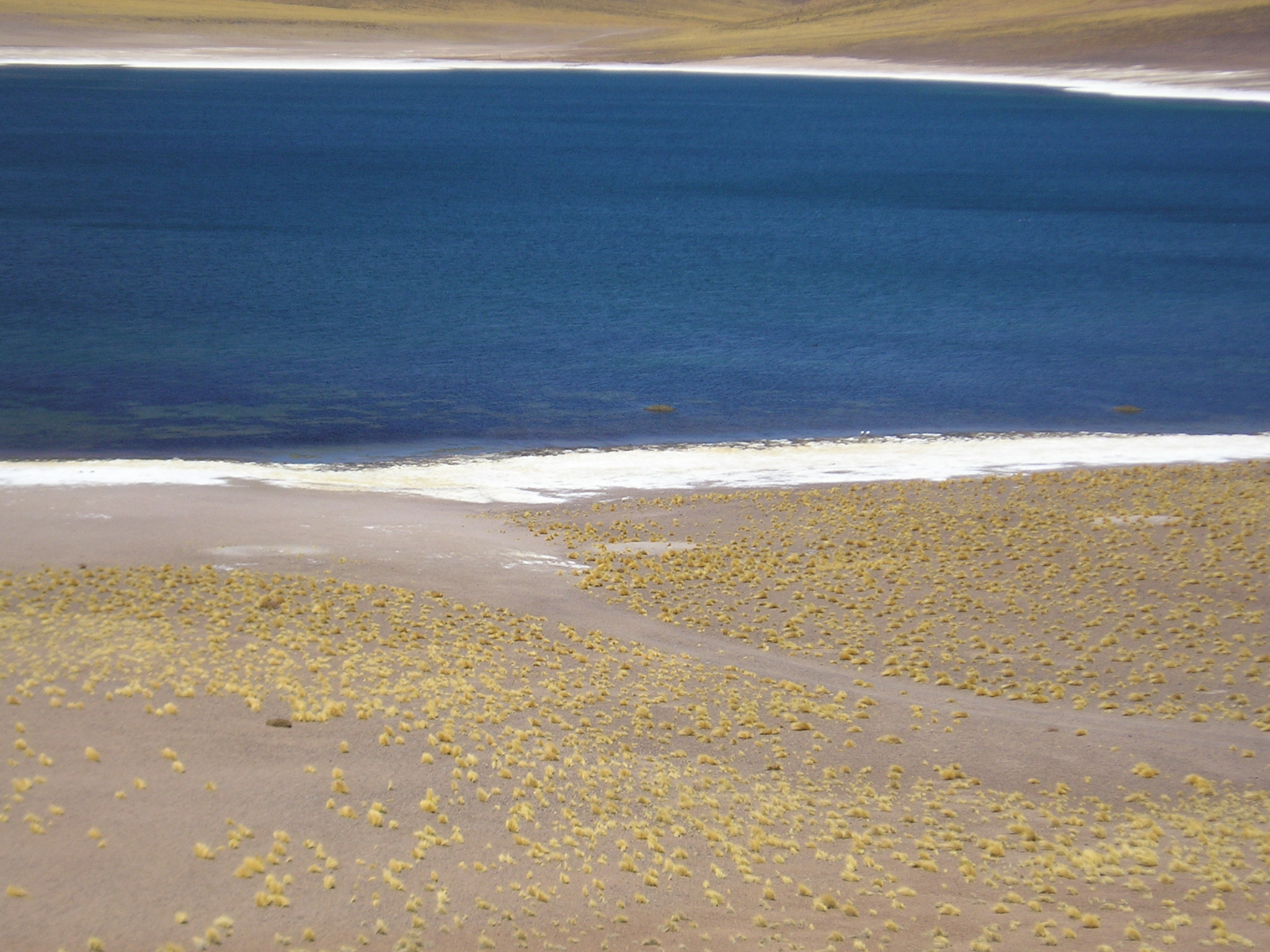
Lake with two nests in the water close to the shoreline

The horned coot is monogamous, and sometimes breeds in colonies of up to 80 pairs. The huge nest is typically located about 40 metres from the shore in the waters of the high altitude lakes where it breeds. Pebbles are piled by the birds to form an artificial island that reaches the water surface. This island is then covered with algae to form the nest. It has been estimated that the pebble mounds may weigh as much as 1.5 tons and they are refurbished in each season. They breed from November to January.

== Distribution and habitat ==
The coot occurs in the altiplano of north-western Argentina, south-western Bolivia, and north-eastern Chile. A single vagrant has been recorded in southern Peru. It is almost entirely restricted to lakes at altitudes of 3000–5200 m.a.s.l., but has occasionally been recorded at lower altitudes.

== Status and conservation ==
It is generally a low-density species; total population has been estimated at 5,000–25,000 mature individuals as of 2025. The Chilean sub-population is estimated to contain approximately 620 individuals. Consequently, it is considered to be near threatened by BirdLife International and IUCN.
