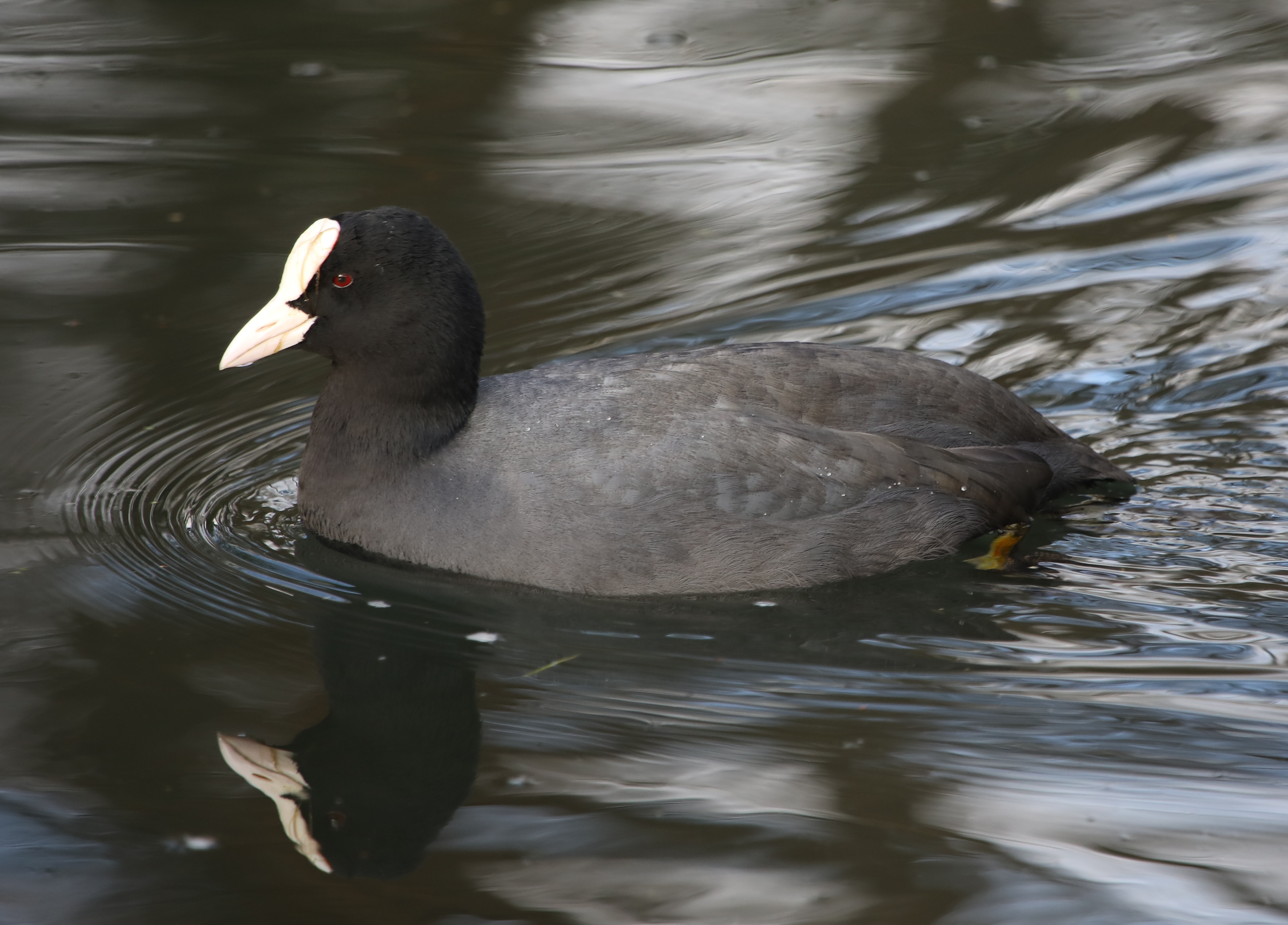
- Eurasian coot (Fulica atra)

Scientific classification
- Kingdom: Animalia
- Phylum: Chordata
- Class: Aves
- Order: Gruiformes
- Family: Rallidae
- Genus: Fulica; Linnaeus, 1758

Type species
- Fulica atra (Eurasian coot) Linnaeus, 1758

Species
- Fulica alai; Fulica americana; Fulica ardesiaca; Fulica armillata; Fulica atra; Fulica cornuta; Fulica cristata; Fulica gigantea; Fulica leucoptera; Fulica rufifrons; For extinct and prehistoric species, see article text

= Coot =

Coot Temporal range: Early Pliocene to present

Genus of birds

Coots are medium-sized water birds that are members of the rail family, Rallidae. They constitute the genus Fulica, the name being the Latin term for "coot". Coots have predominantly black plumage, and—unlike many rails—they are usually easy to see, often swimming in open water.

== Taxonomy and systematics ==
The genus Fulica was introduced in 1758 by the Swedish naturalist Carl Linnaeus in the tenth edition of his Systema Naturae. The genus name is the Latin word for a Eurasian coot. The name was used by the Swiss naturalist Conrad Gessner in 1555. The type species is the Eurasian coot.

A group of coots is referred to as a covert or cover.

=== Species ===
The genus contains 10 extant species and one which is now extinct.

Image	Scientific name	Common name	Distribution
	Fulica alai Peale, 1848	Hawaiian coot or ʻAlae keʻokeʻo	Hawaii
	Fulica americana Gmelin, 1789	American coot	southern Quebec to the Pacific coast of North America and as far south as northern South America
	Fulica ardesiaca Tschudi, 1843	Andean coot	Argentina, Bolivia, Chile, Colombia, Ecuador, Peru
	Fulica armillata Vieillot, 1817	red-gartered coot	Argentina, southern Brazil, Chile, Paraguay, Uruguay
	Fulica atra Linnaeus, 1758	Eurasian coot or common coot	Europe, Asia, Australia, and Africa
	Fulica cornuta Bonaparte, 1853	horned coot	Argentina, Bolivia, Chile
	Fulica cristata Gmelin, 1789	red-knobbed coot	Africa, Iberian Peninsula
	Fulica gigantea Eydoux & Souleyet, 1841	giant coot	Argentina, Bolivia, Chile, Peru
	Fulica leucoptera Vieillot, 1817	white-winged coot	Argentina, Bolivia, Brazil, Chile, Falkland Islands, Paraguay, Uruguay
	Fulica rufifrons Philppi & Landbeck, 1861	red-fronted coot	Argentina, southern Brazil, Chile, Paraguay, southern Peru, Uruguay

=== Extinct species ===
==== Recently extinct species ====
- †Fulica newtonii Milne-Edwards, 1867 – Mascarene coot (extinct, c. 1700)

==== Late Quaternary species ====
- †Fulica chathamensis Forbes, 1892 – Chatham Island coot (early Holocene of the Chatham Islands)
- †Fulica montanei Alarcón-Muñoz, Labarca & Soto-Acuña, 2020 (late Pleistocene to early Holocene of Chile)
- †Fulica prisca Hamilton, 1893 – New Zealand coot (early Holocene of New Zealand)
- †Fulica shufeldti (Brodkorb, 1964) (late Pleistocene of Florida) possibly a paleosubspecies of Fulica americana; formerly F. minor

==== Fossil species ====
- †Fulica infelix Brodkorb, 1961 – (early Pliocene of Juntura, Malheur County, Oregon, USA)

== Description ==
Coots have prominent frontal shields or decoration on their foreheads, with red to dark red eyes and coloured bills. Many have white on the under tail. The featherless shield gave rise to the expression "as bald as a coot", which the Oxford English Dictionary cites in use as early as 1430. Coots have long toes with broad lobes of skin that allow them to kick and propel themselves through the water. The lobes of skin fold back each time the coot lifts its foot, allowing them to walk on dry land while also providing support in mucky terrain. They tend to have short, rounded wings and are weak fliers, though northern species nevertheless can cover long distances. They typically congregate in large rafts in open water. Along these rafts coots may lay eggs in their own nest or in some other bird's. Depending on the species of coot the eggs can vary in color: buff, pinkish buff or buff-gray speckled with dark brown, purplish brown, or black.

== Distribution and habitat ==
The greatest species variety occurs in South America, and the genus likely originated there. They are common in Europe and North America. Coot species that migrate do so at night. The American coot has been observed rarely in Britain and Ireland, while the Eurasian coot is found across Asia, Australia and parts of Africa. In southern Louisiana, the coot is referred to by the French name "poule d'eau", which translates into English as "water hen".

== Behaviour and ecology ==
Coots are omnivorous, eating mainly plant material, but also small animals, fish and eggs. They are aggressively territorial during the breeding season, but are otherwise often found in sizeable flocks on the shallow vegetated lakes they prefer.

Chick mortality occurs mainly due to starvation rather than predation as coots have difficulty feeding a large family of hatchlings on the tiny shrimp and insects that they collect. Many chicks die in the first 10 days after hatching, when they are most dependent on adults for food. Coots can be very brutal to their own young under pressure such as the lack of food, and after about three days they start attacking their own chicks when they beg for food. After a short while, these attacks concentrate on the weaker chicks, who eventually give up begging and die. The coot may eventually raise only two or three out of nine hatchlings. In this attacking behaviour, the parents are said to "tousle" their young. This can result in the death of the chick.
