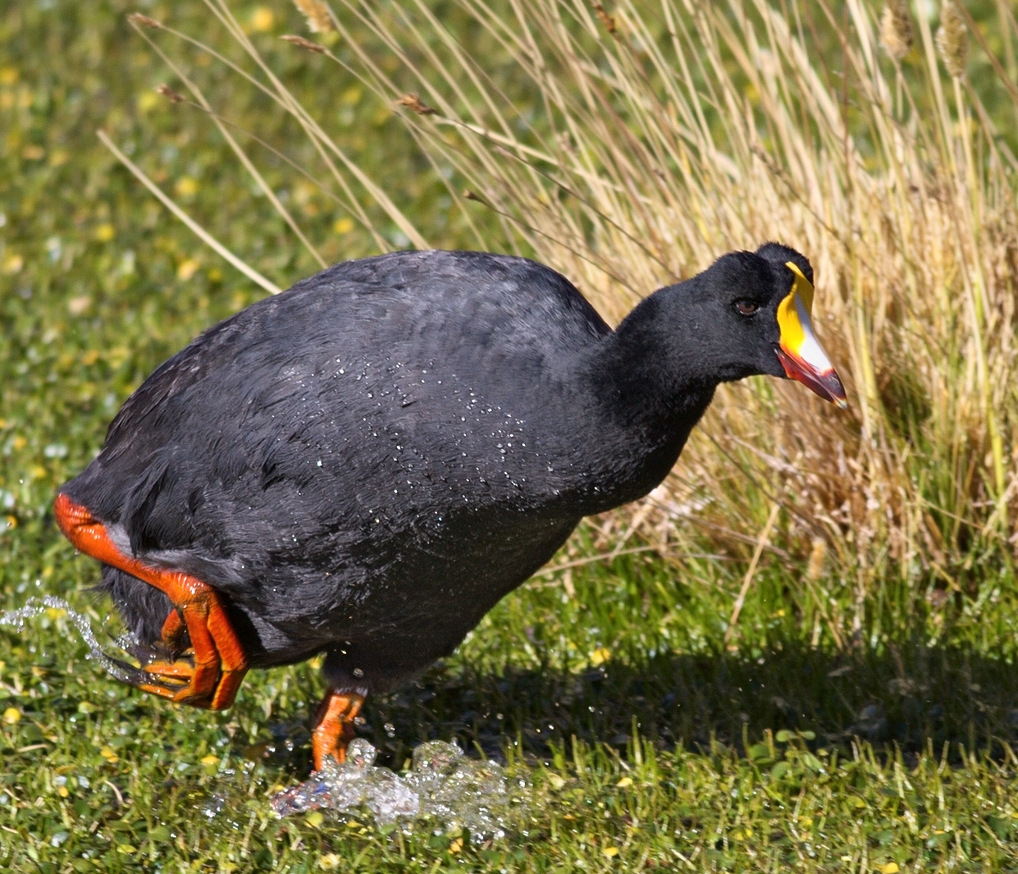
- In Chile

Conservation status
- Least Concern (IUCN 3.1)

Scientific classification
- Kingdom: Animalia
- Phylum: Chordata
- Class: Aves
- Order: Gruiformes
- Family: Rallidae
- Genus: Fulica
- Species: F. gigantea

Binomial name
- Fulica gigantea Eydoux & Souleyet, 1841

= Giant coot =

Species of bird

The giant coot (Fulica gigantea) is a species of bird in subfamily Rallinae of family Rallidae, the rails, gallinules, and coots. It is found in Argentina, Bolivia, Chile, and Peru.

== Taxonomy and systematics ==
The giant coot is monotypic.

== Description ==
The giant coot is the second largest extant member of family Rallidae, after the takahē of New Zealand. Adults are 48 to 59 cm (19 to 23 in) long. They weigh about 2,000 to 2,500 g (4.4 to 5.5 lb) and are too heavy to fly, though immature birds are smaller and readily fly. The sexes are alike. Adults have a bulky body and a disproportionately small head. Their plumage is deep slaty gray that is blacker on the head and neck. Their undertail coverts have some white streaking. Their bill is deep red with some yellow at the base of the maxilla, their frontal shield is yellow, and unique among coots their legs and feet are deep red. Immature birds have dark gray underparts and a paler bill and legs than adults. Juveniles are dark dull gray with some white on the face and dusky legs.

== Distribution and habitat ==
The giant coot is found from southern Peru through western Bolivia into northern Chile and northwestern Argentina. It is a bird of the Altiplano, a generally barren high elevation landscape. There it inhabits ponds and lakes, especially those with weedy shallows. It mainly occurs between 3,600 and 5,000 m (11,800 and 16,400 ft) but is regular as high as 6,540 m (21,500 ft) and occasionally wanders as far as the Pacific coast.

== Behavior ==
=== Movement ===
Giant coot adults are generally sedentary though they may walk to open water if a small pond freezes. Immature birds disperse by flying at night.

=== Feeding ===
The giant coot feeds mostly on aquatic vegetation, especially plants of genera Myriophyllum, Potamogeton, Zannichellia, and Ruppia. It also eats algae but shuns Chara. It feeds mostly at the water surface but occasionally dabbles like a duck or dives; it also grazes on shore.

=== Breeding ===
The giant coot breeds at any season, but its peak egg-laying period is the local winter of June and July. The species is monogamous and very territorial. It makes a huge nest of plant material dredged and piled up in water about 1 m (3 ft) deep. Newish nests float but as nesting progresses and both members of the pair add material it usually ends up resting on the bottom. The clutch size is three to seven eggs and both parents incubate them. Young feed on fresh vegetation added to the nest and also on plants and small animal prey such as amphipods and tadpoles brought by the parents.

=== Vocalization ===
Male giant coots make "alternating gobbling or laughing 'houehouhouhouhoou' and low, growling 'hrr' or 'horr' sounds". Females make "low, crackling 'chee-jrrrh' [and] low squeaking or cracking sounds"; when with a male they also make a "soft 'hi-hirr hirrr hirrr...'".

== Status ==
The IUCN has assessed the giant coot as being of Least Concern. It has a large range and its estimated population of up to 67,000 mature individuals is believed to be stable. No immediate threats have been identified. Though it is generally scarce in much of its range, some areas have large populations, and the populations in Chile and Peru have increased due to controls on firearms.

== Gallery ==
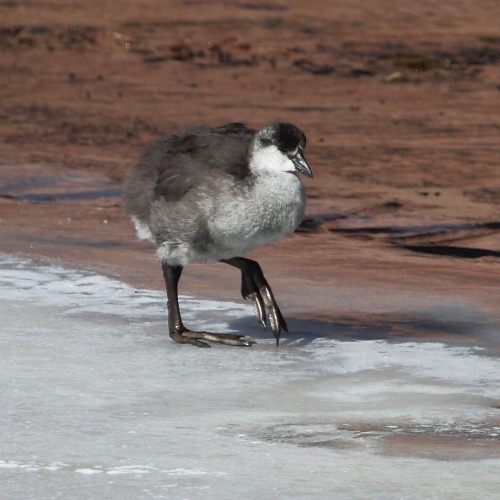
Young

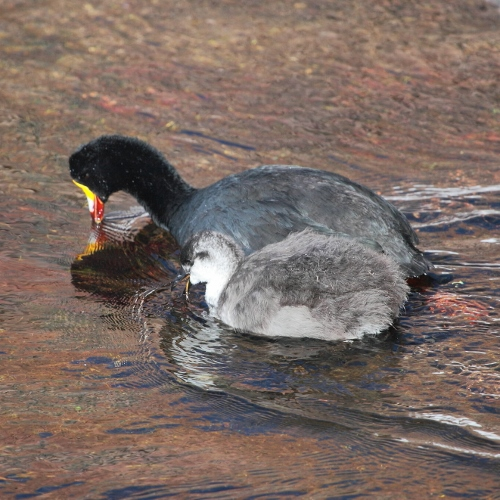
Adult and young feeding

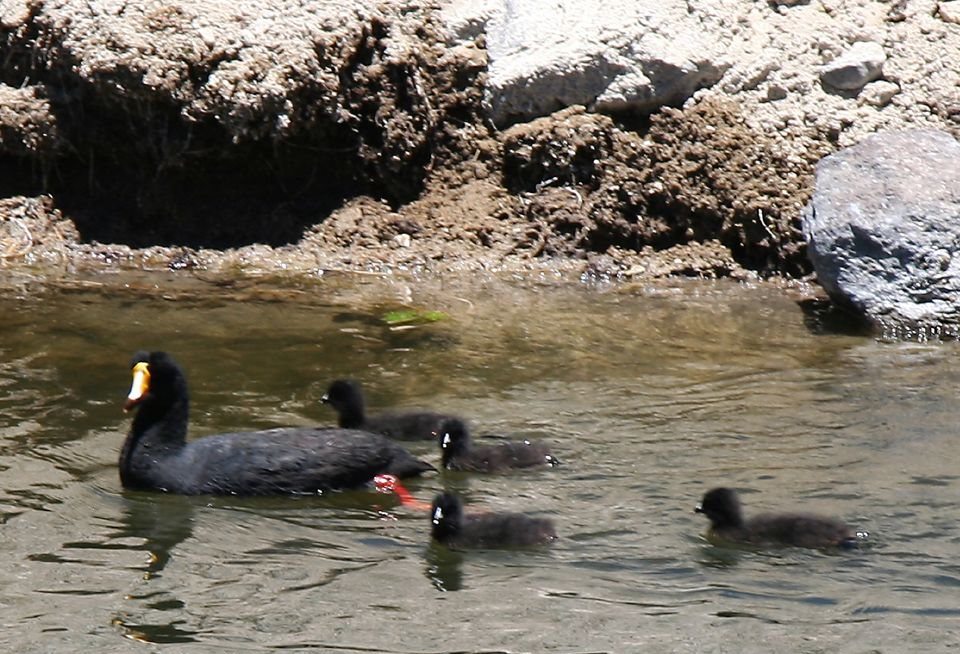
Giant coot with several young

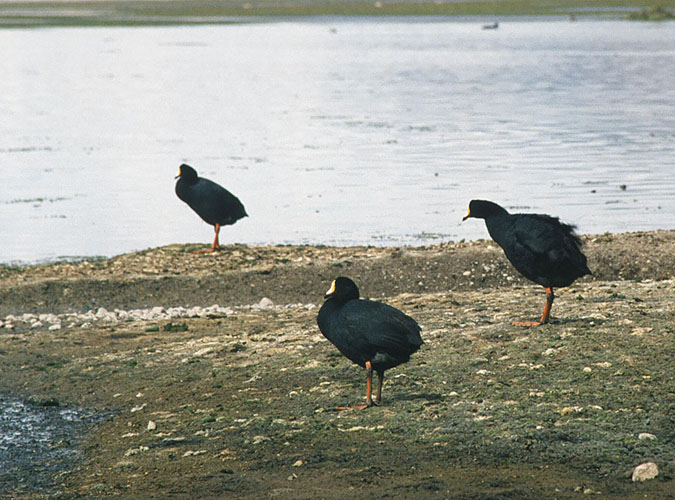
Several adult Giant Coots resting on land at Chungara Park, northernmost Chile.
