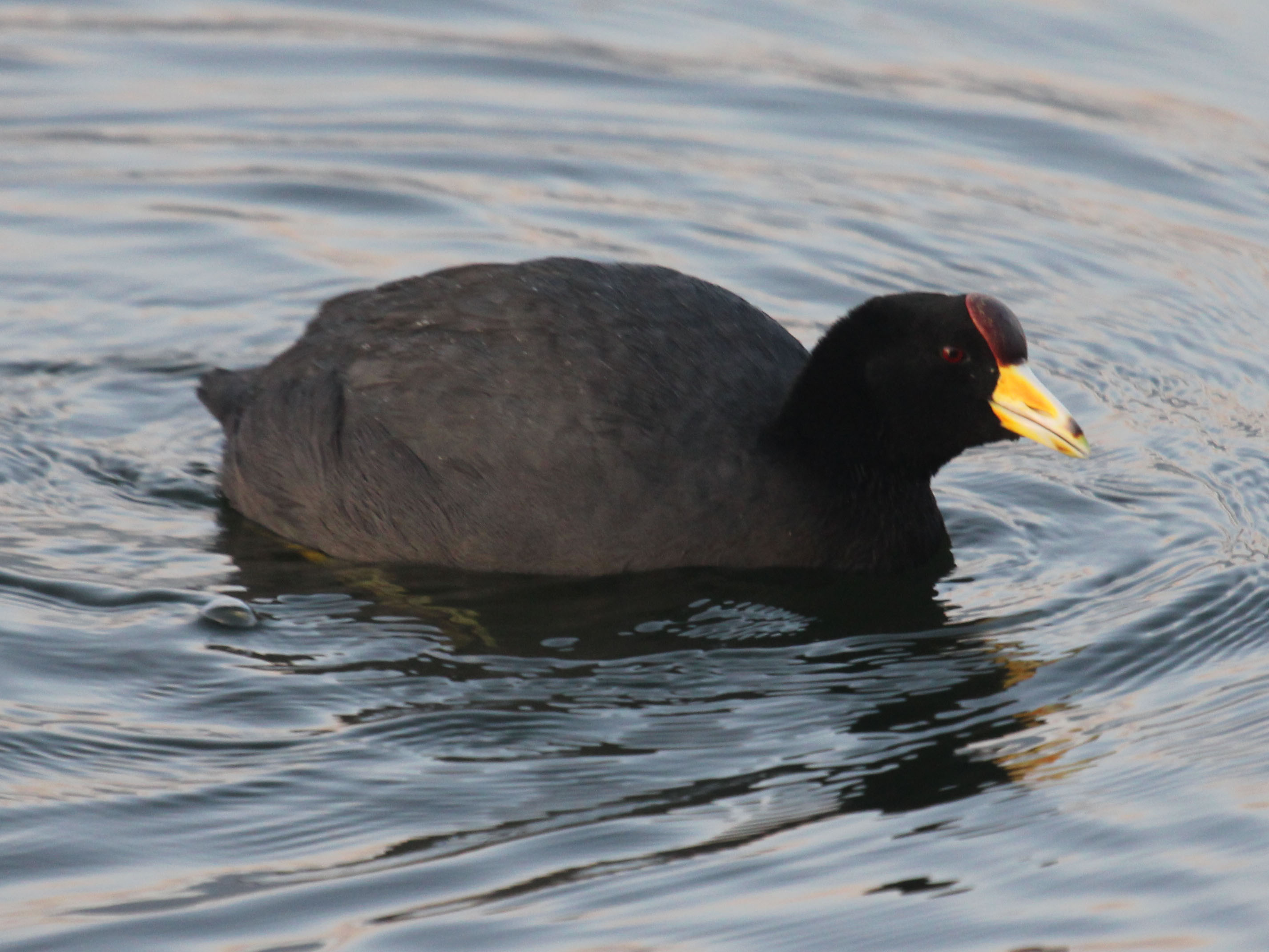
- at Otavalo, Ecuador

Conservation status
- Least Concern (IUCN 3.1)

Scientific classification
- Kingdom: Animalia
- Phylum: Chordata
- Class: Aves
- Order: Gruiformes
- Family: Rallidae
- Genus: Fulica
- Species: F. ardesiaca

Binomial name
- Fulica ardesiaca Tschudi, 1843

= Andean coot =

Andean coot Temporal range: Late Pleistocene–present

Species of bird

The Andean coot (Fulica ardesiaca), also known as the slate-colored coot, is a species of bird in subfamily Rallinae of family Rallidae, the rails, gallinules, and coots. It is found in Argentina, Bolivia, Chile, Colombia, Ecuador, and Peru.

== Taxonomy and systematics ==
The Andean coot has two subspecies, the nominate F. a. ardesiaca and F. a. atrura. They have a somewhat tortuous taxonomic history. The nominate was at one time treated as a subspecies of the American coot (F. americana) and the other as a separate species. Later they were both included as subspecies of the American coot. The current treatment has been widely accepted since the 1980s, but there is some speculation that the subspecies might be full species.

== Description ==
The Andean coot is 40 to 43 cm (16 to 17 in) long. It has two color morphs that are present in both subspecies. Both morphs are mostly slaty gray that is blacker on the head and neck. Their secondaries usually have white tips. One morph has a chrome yellow bill that is paler yellow and sometimes green on the tip, a deep chesnut frontal shield, and green legs and feet. The other has a white bill, a white to orange-yellow frontal shield, and slaty legs and feet. Independent of the color morphs, the subspecies differ only in the color of their undertail coverts: The nominate's are white and those of F. a. atrura are almost black.

== Distribution and habitat ==
The nominate subspecies of Andean coot is found in the Andes from northern Peru south through western Bolivia into northern Chile as far as the Antofagasta Region and into northwestern Argentina as far as Catamarca Province. F. a. atrura is found from the Andes of southern Colombia through Ecuador into far northern Peru and also in coastal Peru. Fossils tentatively assigned to this species are known from the Laguna de Tagua Tagua formation of Chile.

The Andean coot mostly inhabits large lakes with heavily vegetated shallows, though it also is found in sparsely vegetated lakes and in ponds, marshes, and rivers. Red-fronted birds tend to dominate in vegetated lakes and white-fronted ones in the less vegetated higher elevation ones. The nominate subspecies is found at elevations between 2,100 and 4,700 m (6,900 and 15,400 ft). F. a. atrura is found between 2,200 and 3,600 m (7,200 and 11,800 ft) in Colombia and at lower elevations in Ecuador and Peru.

== Physiology ==
Populations of Andean coots that live at high elevations have adapted physiologically to a low-oxygen environment. Those living higher have more capillaries per square millimeter of muscle compared to those living at sea level.

== Behavior ==
=== Movement ===
Andean coots make some seasonal movements but they have not been defined.

=== Feeding ===
The Andean coot's diet is mostly aquatic vegetation. Chara is a main component, especially in higher elevation lakes, but others include Myriophyllum and Elodea. It feeds by diving as deep as 5 m (20 ft) and also by walking on floating vegetation. It is gregarious when not breeding and often feeds with other species of coots.

=== Breeding ===
The Andean coot's breeding season varies geographically. It may breed at any time of year but most egg laying is in the July–August dry season. It is monogamous and when breeding it is aggressive and territorial. Mixed pairs of the two color morphs often occur. Nests are constructed among reeds or on floating vegetation. Most clutches are of four or five eggs.

=== Vocalization ===
The Andean coot's usual call is "a low 'churr' or harder 'hrrp'" that is often repeated. Females make a "low chitter".

== Status ==
The IUCN has assessed the Andean coot as being of Least Concern. It has a large range, but its population size and trend are not known. No immediate threats have been identified. It is considered "locally common to abundant, sometimes assembling in thousands."

== Gallery ==
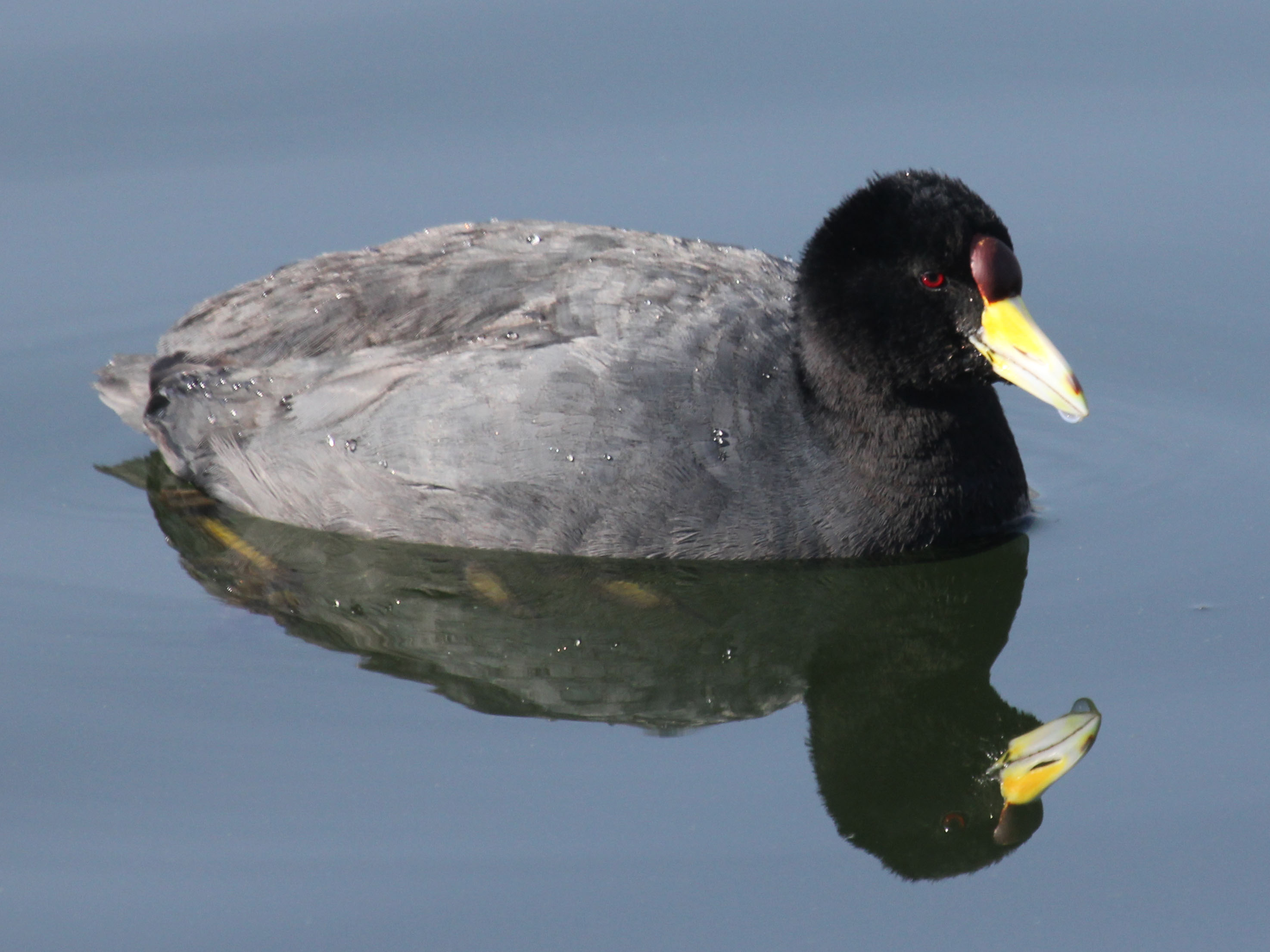
Red-fronted morph

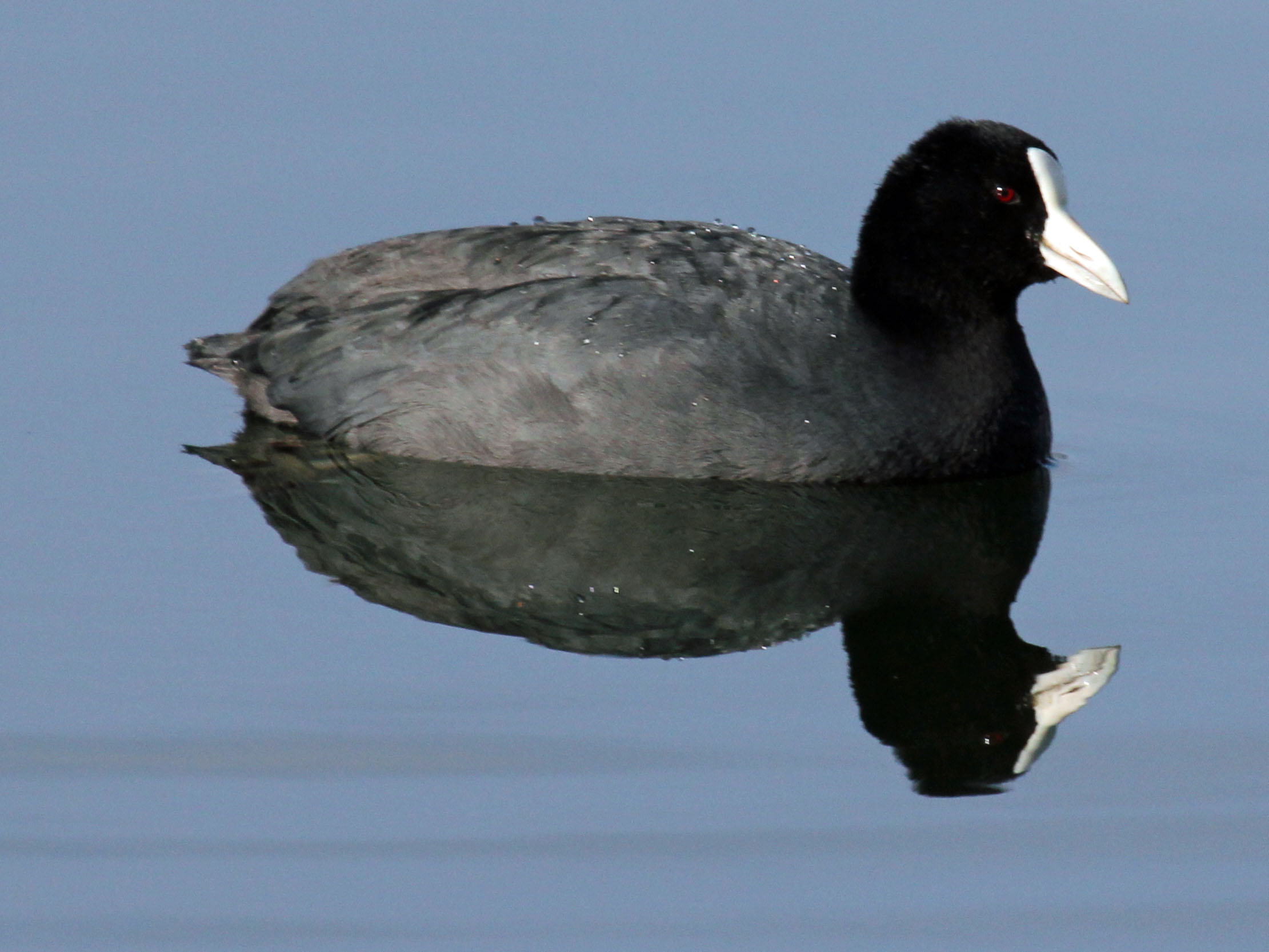
White-fronted morph

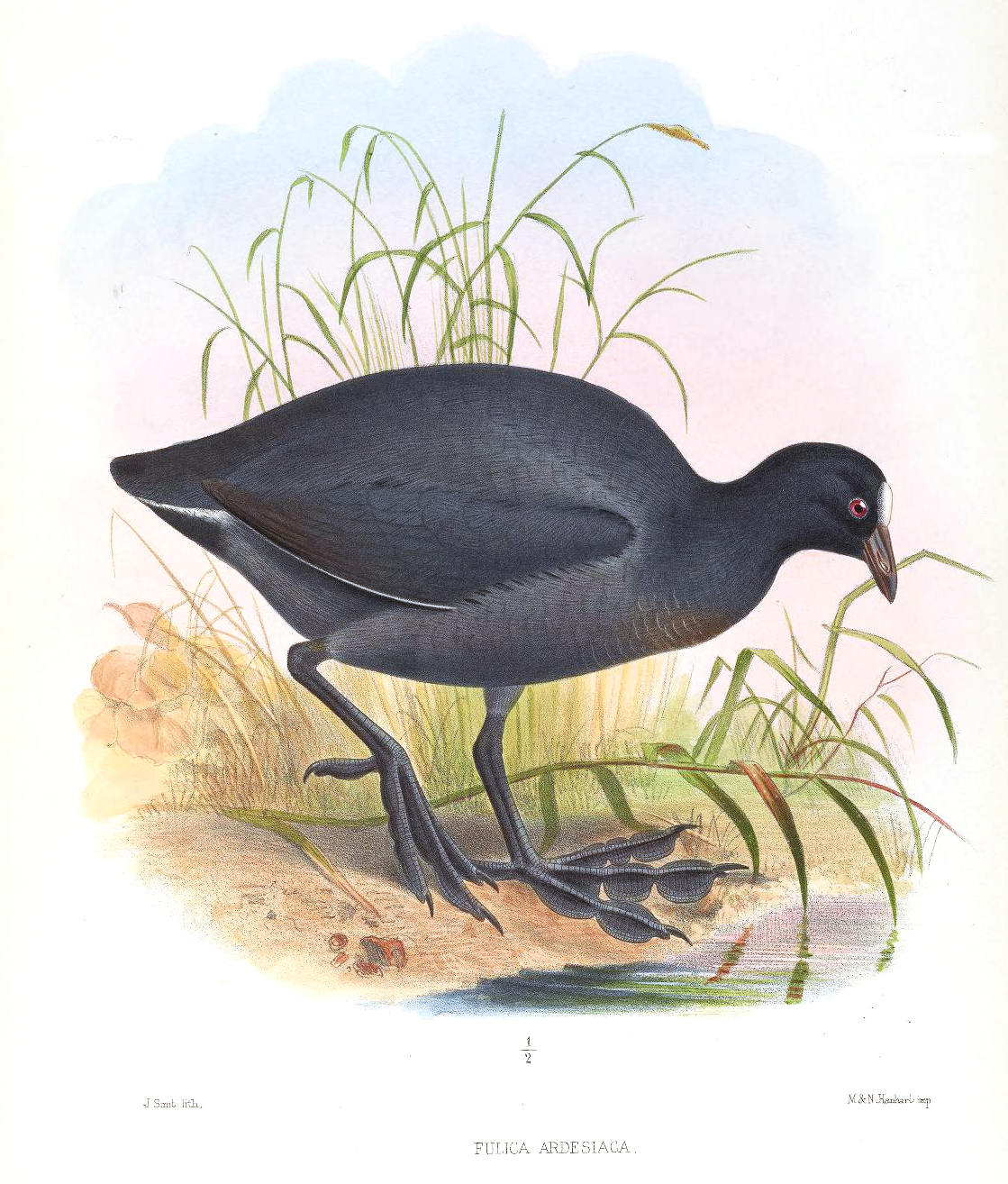
Illustration by Joseph Smit, 1869
