= Henry Darondeau =

French composer and piano teacher

Henry Benoît François Darondeau (born as "d'Arondeau") (28 February 1779 – 30 July 1865) was a 19th-century French composer and piano teacher.

== Life ==
Henry Darondeau was born in Strasbourg, Alsace, the son of the Munich-born French composer Benoni Darondeau who came to Paris as a vocal teacher in 1782. Around 1802, he studied in Paris with Henri-Montan Berton (composition) and Ignaz Anton Ladurner (piano), leaving the Conservatoire without a degree. Afterwards he was active as a piano teacher and composer before he moved to Bourges in 1836.

In Bourges, he worked as an organist and gave lessons in solfège, piano, harmony and counterpoint, among others to the young Frédéric Barbier.

In 1860, he returned to Paris, resuming his wide-spread contacts among notable musicians of his time, including Adolphe Adam and François Antoine Habeneck, and poets like Marc-Antoine Madeleine Désaugiers. He was closely attached to the Théâtre des Variétés and the second Théâtre de l'Ambigu-Comique, for which he composed (comic) operas, ballets and incidental music. He also excelled as a composer of romances as well as potpourris and transcriptions of popular works by other composers.

He was the father of Benoît Darondeau, hydrographer, and Stanislas Darondeau, a painter. He died Paris in Paris.

== Selected works ==
He wrote some 100 works among which:

- Rosina et Lorenzo, ballet by Jean-Pierre Aumer (1805)
- Le Retour de la sentinelle, lyrics by Louis Brault (1809)
- Frédéric duc de Nevers, text by Mardelle, E. F. Varez (1810)
- Herliska, Op. 35 for piano (1862)
