= Benoît Darondeau =

French hydrograph engineer

Benoît Darondeau (8 April 1805 – 1 March 1869) was a 19th-century French hydrograph engineer. He participated in the expedition around the world of la Bonite in 1835–1836.

Born in Paris, he was a son of the composer Henry Darondeau and one of the brothers of the painter Stanislas Darondeau. He graduated as an engineer from the prestigious École polytechnique in Paris, one of France's grandes écoles.

== Publications ==
- Observations magnétiques (Voyage autour du monde exécuté pendant les années, 1836 et 1837 sur la Corvette La Bonité commandés par M. Vaillant) (Paris: Arthus Bertrand, 1842–1846).
- Notice sur les erreurs des compas dues aux attractions locales à bord des navires en bois et en fer (Paris: Dupont, 1858)
- Sur l'emploi du compas étalon et la courbe des déviations à bord des navires en fer et autres (Paris: Ministère de la Marine et des Colonies, Dépôt des Cartes et Plans de la Marine, 1863).

== See also ==
- European and American voyages of scientific exploration

== Bibliography ==
- Étienne Taillemite, Dictionnaire des marins français (Paris: Éditions maritimes & d'outre-mer, 1982), p. 80.
