= New Zealand coot =

New Zealand coot Temporal range: Holocene

Scientific classification
- Kingdom: Animalia
- Phylum: Chordata
- Class: Aves
- Order: Gruiformes
- Family: Rallidae
- Genus: Fulica
- Species: F. prisca

Binomial name
- Fulica prisca Hamilton, 1893

Synonyms
- Palaeolimnas prisca; Nesophalaris prisca Brodkorb & Dawson, 1962; Fulica chathamensis prisca Olson, 1975

Extinct species of bird

The New Zealand coot (Fulica prisca) is an extinct bird in the rail family, Rallidae, that was endemic to New Zealand. It was described in 1893 by New Zealand naturalist, ethnologist and museum director Augustus Hamilton, from material he had collected the previous year at Castle Rocks on the Ōreti River in Southland. The Latin specific epithet prisca means "old", referring to its subfossil occurrence. Remains have subsequently been found at several sites in both North and South Islands.

== Taxonomy ==
The New Zealand coot and the related Chatham coot (F. chathamensis) are classified as coots on the basis of anatomical features of the pelvis and humerus typical of the genus. There has been disagreement regarding the relationship between the two species. They have variously been considered full species, subspecies or lacking in taxonomic distinction. At one point a new genus, Nesophalaris, was proposed for them. A review by Trevor Worthy and Richard Holdaway in 2002 recommended that both coots be treated as separate species.

== Description ==
Although the coot's body proportions were similar to those of living coots, it was larger than most, at about 1.8 kg (4 lb) in weight and a length of 40 cm (16 in), though it was still probably able to fly. It was also more terrestrial, with its remains discovered in inland forests and subalpine regions as well as coastal wetlands. Its bones have also been found in early Maori middens in coastal Marlborough, and it is likely to have become extinct through over-hunting.
