= Stanislas Darondeau =

French painter

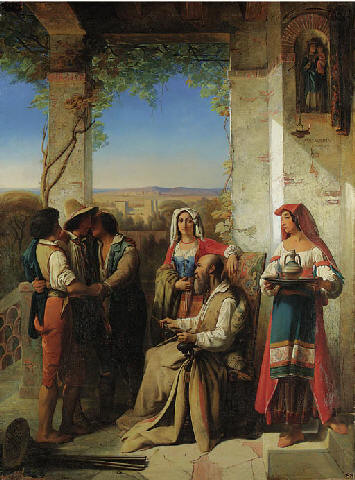
The Return of the Prodigal Son, oil on canvas painting by Stanislas-Henri-Benoit Darondeau, 1840

Stanislas-Henri-Benoit Darondeau (4 April 1807 – 12 July 1842) was a French painter, draftsman and engineer who was born in Paris in 1807. The musician Henry Darondeau was his father and Benoît Darondeau one of his brothers.

He exhibited in the Salon de Paris between 1827 and 1841. His painting reflects the Orientalist movement of great interest in the Near East. He circumnavigated the globe between February 1836 and November 1837 under Auguste Nicolas Vaillant (1793–1858), producing many illustrations of French Polynesia and Hawaii. In 1841-42, he participated in an African expedition under Captain Louis Édouard Bouët-Willaumez aboard the Nisus. Darondeau died in Brest, France in 1841.

The Honolulu Museum of Art and Musée des Beaux-Arts de Bordeaux are among the public collections holding works by Stanislas-Henri-Benoit Darondeau.
