= Louis François Auguste Souleyet =

French zoologist, malacologist and naval surgeon

- Born: 8 January 1811; Besse-sur-Issole, Var, France
- Died: 7 October 1852 (aged 41); Fort-de-France, Martinique
- Scientific career
- Fields: Zoologist, malacologist, naval surgeon
- Institutions: Naturalist-surgeon on the voyage of La Bonite

Louis François Auguste Souleyet (8 January 1811 – 7 October 1852) was a French zoologist, malacologist and naval surgeon.

Souleyet was naturalist-surgeon on the voyage of La Bonite, which circumnavigated the globe between February 1836 and November 1837 under Auguste Nicolas Vaillant (1793–1858). In the Pacific he studied marine molluscs. After the death of Joseph Fortuné Théodore Eydoux (1802–1841), Souleyet completed the zoological section of the voyage's official report in 1852.

Souleyet died of yellow fever in Martinique in 1852.

He named a number of marine molluscs and fish, but most of his new taxa were validated two years earlier by John Edward Gray, who Latinized all vernacular names published earlier in an undated (1842 ?) atlas by Eydoux & Souleyet. He is himself commemorated in the scientific name of the streak-headed woodcreeper, Lepidocolaptes souleyetii, named for him by DesMurs and in the Heteropod Protatlanta souleyeti by Edgar A. Smith in 1888.

== See also ==
- European and American voyages of scientific exploration
