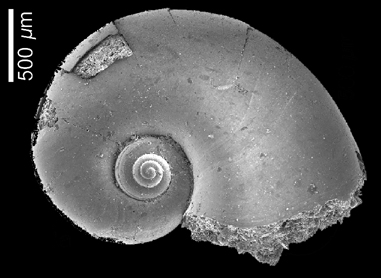
- Protatlanta souleyeti

Scientific classification
- Kingdom: Animalia
- Phylum: Mollusca
- Class: Gastropoda
- Subclass: Caenogastropoda
- Order: Littorinimorpha
- Family: Atlantidae
- Genus: Protatlanta; Tesch, 1908

Species
- See text

= Protatlanta =

Protatlanta Temporal range: Miocene–Recent Miocene-Recent

Genus of gastropods

Atlanta is a genus of pelagic marine gastropod molluscs in the family Atlantidae.

== Species ==
Species in the genus Atlanta include:

- Protatlanta souleyeti (Smith, 1888) - type species and the only Recent species in the genus Protatlanta
- Protatlanta mediterranea Issel, 1915 - recent, sometimes is this considered as separate species
- † Protatlanta rotundata (Gabb, 1873)
