= Joseph Fortuné Théodore Eydoux =

French naturalist (1802–1841)

Joseph Fortuné Théodore Eydoux (23 April 1802 – 6 July 1841) was a French naturalist.

== Biography ==
Eydoux and Louis François Auguste Souleyet were surgeon naturalists on the expedition ship "La Favorite" which made a circumnavigation in 1830-32 captained by Cyrille Pierre Théodore Laplace. In 1836-37 he voyaged again this time with "La Bonite" captained by Auguste-Nicolas Vaillant. He published on the animals and plants collected with Gervais and Louis Souleyet who continued to publish works with Eydoux as co-author after Eydoux's death.

== Works ==
Partial list:

- With P. Gervais Voyage de la Favorite (1822). "Reptiles". Zool. Guérin, Paris 111: 1–10.
- With F. A. Souleyet and Auguste-Nicolas Vaillant (1840-1866). Voyage autour du monde exécuté pendant les années 1836 et 1837 sur la corvette La Bonite, commandée par M. Vaillant capitaine de vaisseau, publié par ordre du roi sous les auspices du département de la Marine. Zoologie. Paris: Bertrand. 15 volumes.

== Legacy ==
A species of sea snake, Aipysurus eydouxii, commemorates his name.

== See also ==
- European and American voyages of scientific exploration
