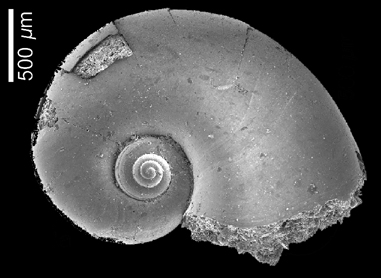
- apical view of the shell of Protatlanta souleyeti from the Pliocene of Philippines

Scientific classification
- Kingdom: Animalia
- Phylum: Mollusca
- Class: Gastropoda
- Subclass: Caenogastropoda
- Order: Littorinimorpha
- Family: Atlantidae
- Genus: Protatlanta
- Species: P. souleyeti

Binomial name
- Protatlanta souleyeti (E. A. Smith, 1888)

Synonyms
- Atlanta souleyeti Smith, 1888

= Protatlanta souleyeti =

Protatlanta souleyeti Temporal range: Pliocene-Recent

Species of gastropod

Protatlanta souleyeti is a species of sea snail, a holoplanktonic marine gastropod mollusk in the family Atlantidae.

Protatlanta souleyeti is the type species on the genus Protatlanta. It is considered to be the only Recent species on the genus.

The specific name souleyeti is in honor of French malacologist Louis François Auguste Souleyet.

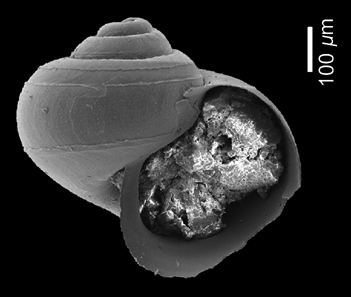
apertural view of protoconch of Protatlanta souleyeti from the Pliocene

== Description ==
The maximum recorded shell length is 2 mm.

Some of the fossil specimens preserve a pinkish colour of the larval shells. The protoconch is naticoid in shape and has approximately 3¼ whorls. Most specimens have two thin spirals above the periphery, visible in apical view, and a third such spiral below the periphery, which separates the base of the protoconch and becomes covered by subsequent whorls. The described ornament can be fairly constant, but some specimens were found in which these three spirals are lacking. Richter (1968, p. 17, fig. 6c) described Recent larval shells from the Gulf of Naples as smooth. For Recent material from near Hawaii, Seapy (1990, p. 114, fig. 4A-D) also stated that the first whorls are smooth. But Batten & Dumont (1976, figs. 39–41) and Richter & Seapy (1999, p. 633, fig. 5A) and Janssen (2007) have described two protoconch morphologies. On the teleoconch whorls, the peripheral belt on which the conchiolin keel was attached is very clear. Growth lines are strongly bent backward on this belt, indicating the presence of a deep sinus on the apertural margin. A very faint spiral striation is visible all over the adult shell surface.

== Distribution ==
The first fossil specimens of Protatlanta souleyeti from Cainozoic has been found from Pliocene in Anda, Pangasinan, Luzon, Philippines in 2001 (published in 2007).

== Habitat ==
Minimum recorded depth is 0 m. Maximum recorded depth is 0 m.
