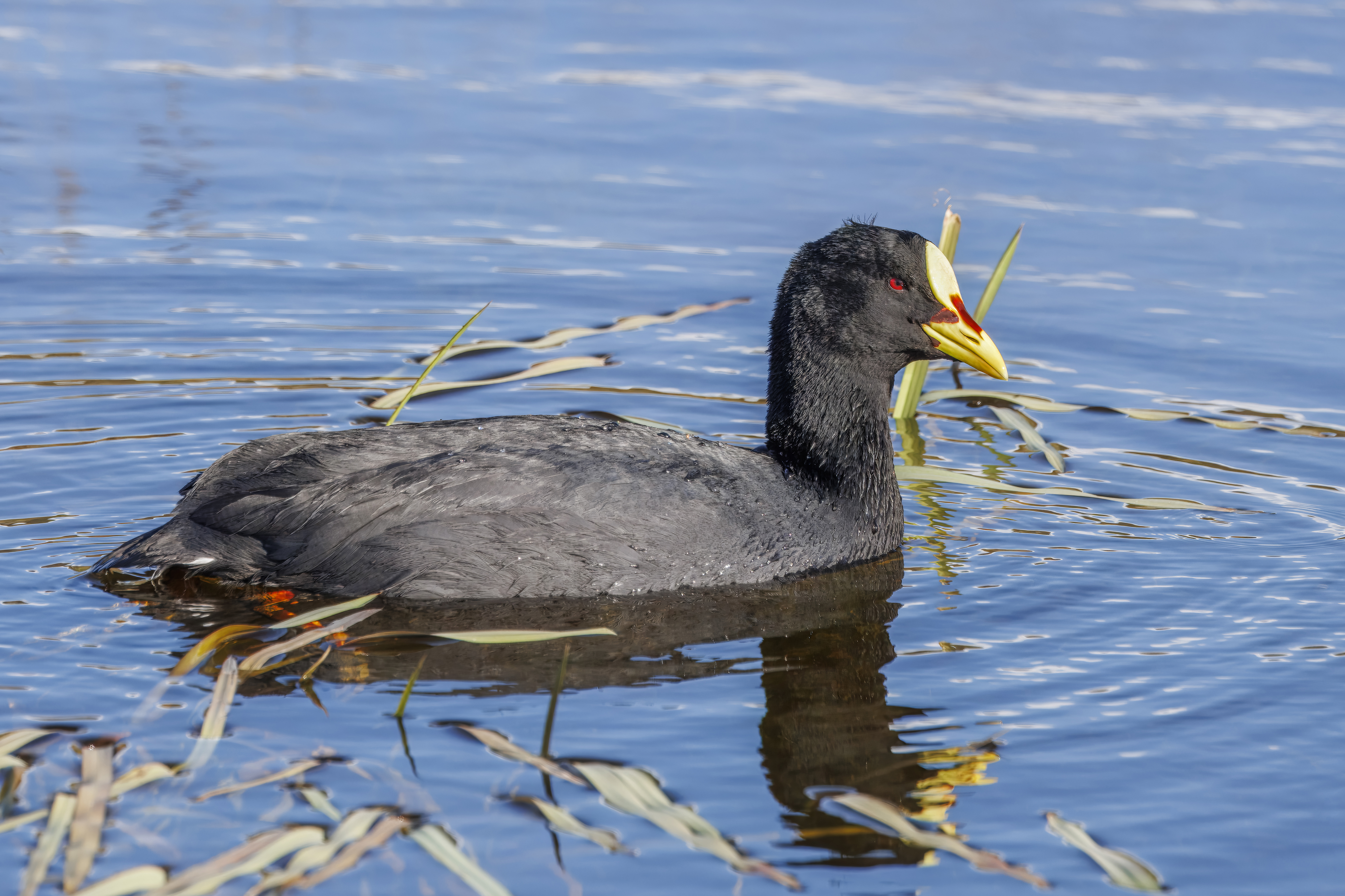
- In Chile

Conservation status
- Least Concern (IUCN 3.1)

Scientific classification
- Kingdom: Animalia
- Phylum: Chordata
- Class: Aves
- Order: Gruiformes
- Family: Rallidae
- Genus: Fulica
- Species: F. armillata

Binomial name
- Fulica armillata Vieillot, 1817

= Red-gartered coot =

Red-gartered coot Temporal range: Late Pleistocene–present

Species of bird

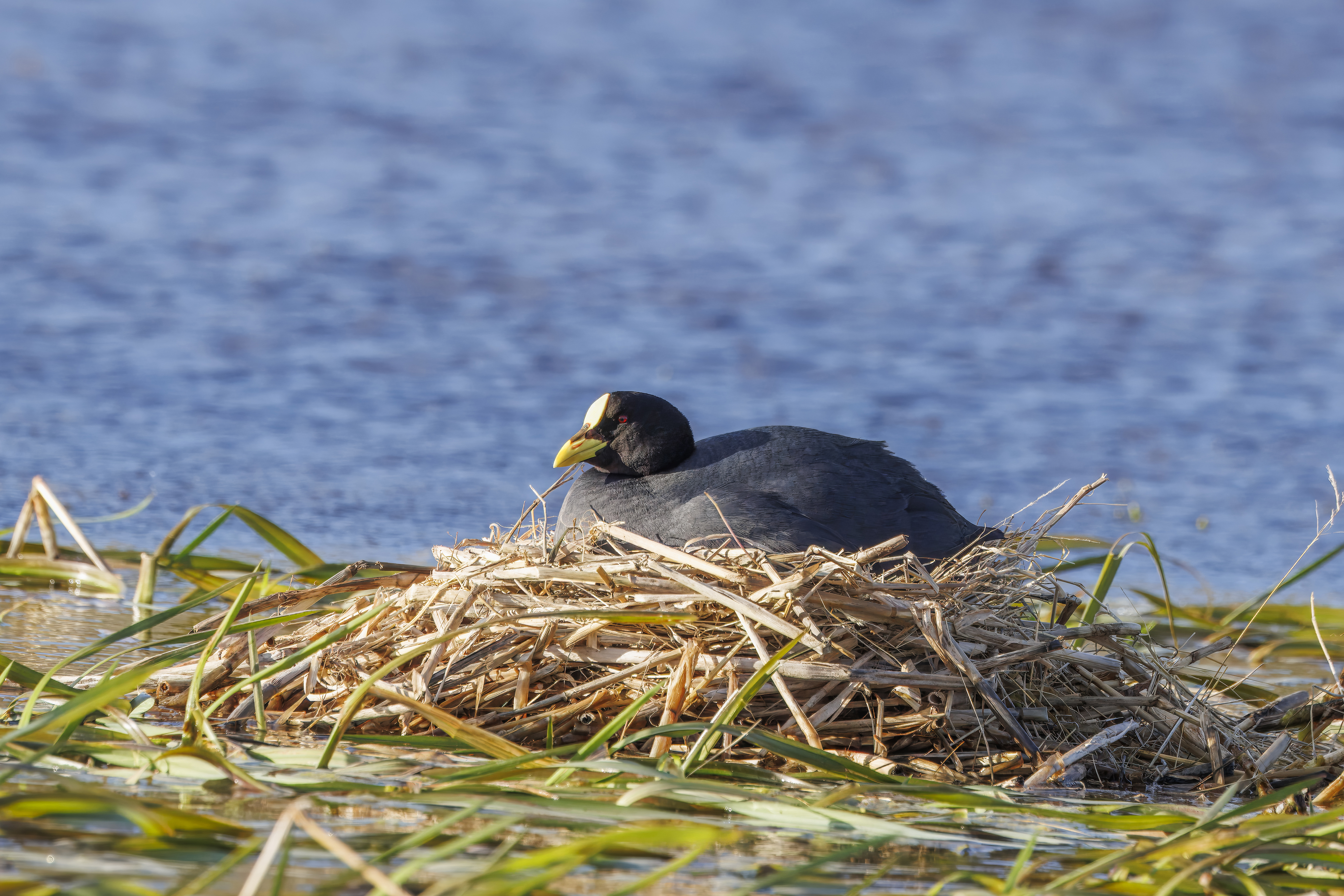
on nest

The red-gartered coot (Fulica armillata) is a species of bird in subfamily Rallinae of family Rallidae, the rails, gallinules, and coots. It is found in Argentina, Brazil, Chile, Paraguay, and Uruguay.

== Taxonomy and systematics ==
The red-gartered coot is monotypic.

== Description ==
The red-gartered coot is 43 to 51 cm (17 to 20 in) long. The sexes are alike. Adults have a yellow bill and frontal shield with a patch of red between them. (The bill is sometimes reddish.) Their legs are orange-yellow to yellow with a pale red "garter" above the ankle. Their plumage is slaty gray that is blacker on the head and neck. Their undertail coverts are white. Immature birds have a paler bill than adults and olive legs and feet. Juveniles are drab gray-brown with dusky mottling on a white head and neck.

== Distribution and habitat ==
The red-gartered coot is found from central and southern Chile, Paraguay, and southeastern Brazil south through Argentina to Tierra del Fuego. It has reached the Falkland Islands as a vagrant, and sight records in Bolivia lead the South American Classification Committee of the American Ornithological Society to classify it as hypothetical in that country. Fossils of this species are known from the Laguna de Tagua Tagua formation of Chile.

The red-gartered coot inhabits large ponds, lakes, rivers, and marshes, and in winter sheltered marine bays. It is generally a bird of the lowlands but occurs up to about 1,200 m (3,900 ft) in Patagonia, to 1,000 m (3,300 ft) in the southern Andes, and as high as 2,100 m (6,900 ft) in northwestern Argentina.

== Behavior ==
=== Movement ===
The red-gartered coot is believed to be mostly sedentary but does make some local movements and has strayed from its normal range.

=== Feeding ===
The red-gartered coot feeds primarily on aquatic plants, mostly by diving in open water but also upends like a duck in shallower water. It also grazes on land near water.

=== Breeding ===
The red-gartered coot's breeding season varies geographically, but is generally within September to November. It is monogamous and when breeding it is aggressive and territorial, though outside that season it is gregarious. It builds a loose platform nest of dried rushes with a rim, usually attached to rushes but sometimes floating. The clutch size is two to eight eggs; both parents incubate the eggs and care for the young.

=== Vocalization ===
Male red-gartered coots make a "whistled 'huit'" alarm call, in aggression "an explosive 'pit' and repeated 'wuw'", and when near a female a "repeated soft 'cuit'". The female's alarm call is "yec" and it also makes a "loud, repeated 'terr'."

== Status ==
The IUCN has assessed the red-gartered coot as being of Least Concern, though its population size and trend are not known. No immediate threats have been identified. It is considered common.
