= Auguste-Nicolas Vaillant =

French sailor

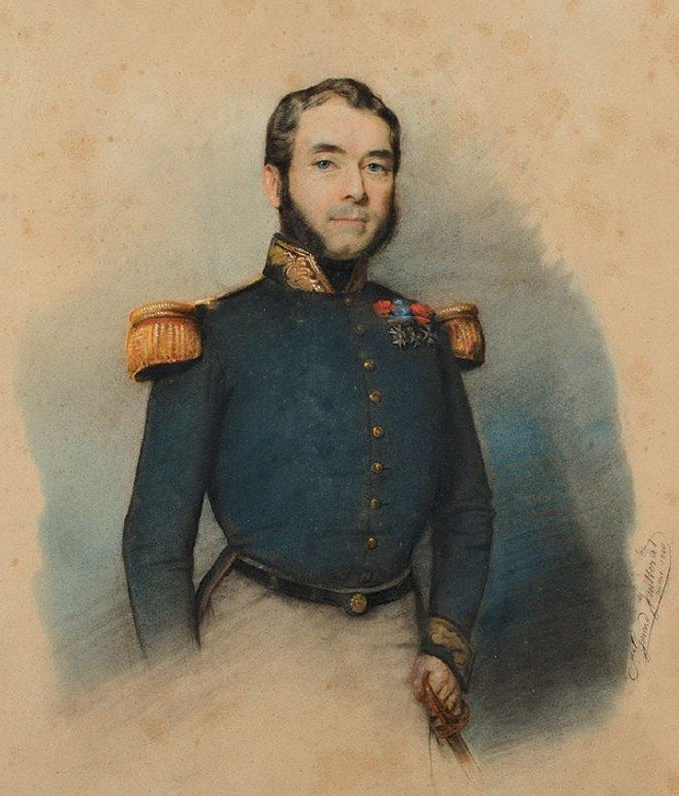
- Born: 2 July 1793; Paris, France
- Died: 1 November 1858 (aged 65); Paris, France
- Occupation: Naval officer
- Known for: Circumnavigation of the globe

Auguste-Nicolas Vaillant (2 July 1793 – 1 November 1858) was a French sailor who worked his way up through the ranks from common seaman to rear-admiral. In 1836–37 he captained a 21-month voyage round the globe in which the scientists made many useful botanical and zoological observations, later described in an 11-volume illustrated account. He was briefly Minister of Navy and Colonies in 1851 during the French Second Republic.

== Early years ==
Auguste-Nicolas Vaillant was born in Paris, France, on 2 July 1793. He joined the navy as a simple apprentice sailor. He sailed on the coast of Brittany and in the English Channel, which was blockaded by the English fleet during the Napoleonic Wars He was promoted to 2nd class cadet on 1 December 1810 and served on coastal vessels and on river and canal boats. He was promoted to 1st class cadet on 29 March 1813 and soon after was given command of the Texel. He vigorously suppressed a revolt of the Dutch crew. This brought him to the attention of Admiral Carel Hendrik Ver Huell, who made him first an infantry lieutenant then an artillery lieutenant in the forts of la Salle and l'Ecluse. Vaillant fought in the Channel and on the coast of Flanders on the brig Génie and the frigate Hermione. After the end of the wars, on 20 June 1816 he was discharged on suspicion of Bonapartism.

== Naval officer ==
Vaillant was restored to his rank of sub-lieutenant (Enseigne de vaisseau) on 1 July 1818. That year he was sent on an exploratory expedition to French Guiana to investigate how it should be colonized. He explored the Maroni River, at that time virtually unknown to Europeans, and made a detailed map and description. He was made Lieutenant on 4 August 1824, and the next year was given command of the Estafette, which was employed in turn in the Levant, at Tunis, and on the coasts of Catalonia and Romagna. For his conduct in a storm in the Hellenic archipelago, and for a courageous expedition against the pirates of Andros, on 3 November 1827 he was awarded the cross of the Order of Saint Louis.

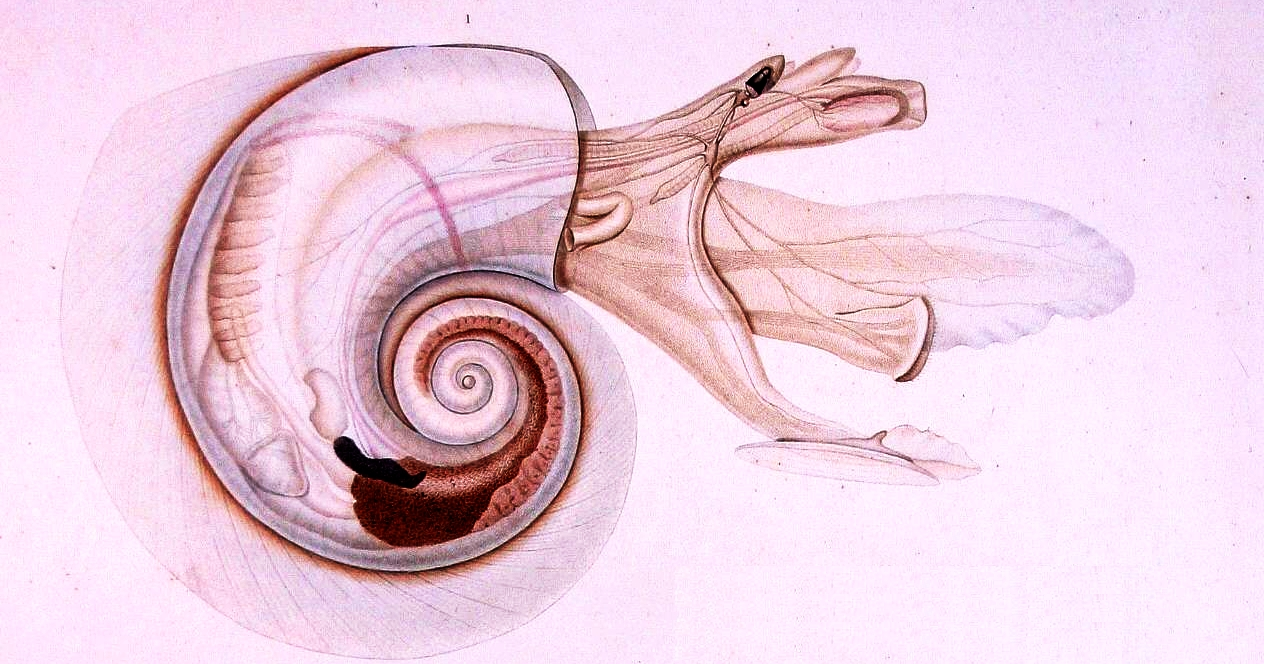
A mollusc, one of many botanical drawing made on the voyage of the Bonite

In 1828 Vaillant participated in the Morea expedition during the Greek War of Independence. In November 1828 he became chief of staff of Admiral Henri de Rigny. When the admiral was named Minister of the Navy, M. Lalonde took command of the Levant station. Vaillant served under him as commander of the Actéon. He was named Commander (Capitaine de frégate) on 1 March 1831, and became aide-de-camp to the Naval Minister Henri de Rigny. He continued in this role under Commodore Louis Léon Jacob and Admiral Guy-Victor Duperré.

In February 1836 Vaillant was given command of the Bonite for a voyage of circumnavigation of the globe. The primary purpose of Vaillant's journey was to take several consular agents to various remote posts, but the staff also made many valuable scientific observations. La Bonite left Toulon on 6 February 1836 carrying the artist and botanist Benôit-Henri Darondeau and others. They passed the Strait of Gibraltar, crossed the Atlantic and reached Rio de Janeiro in Brazil in March 1836. The vessel rounded Cape Horn and reached Valparaíso in Chile on 17 June 1836. They sailed via Peru to Honolulu, Hawaii, where they stayed from 28 September to 11 October 1836. The return journey took La Bonite via the Mariana Islands, Manila in the Philippines, Canton, Singapore, Kolkata, Pondicherry, Réunion, the Cape of Good Hope and Saint Helena to Brest, which was reached on 6 November 1837. No crew members were lost in the 21-month voyage.

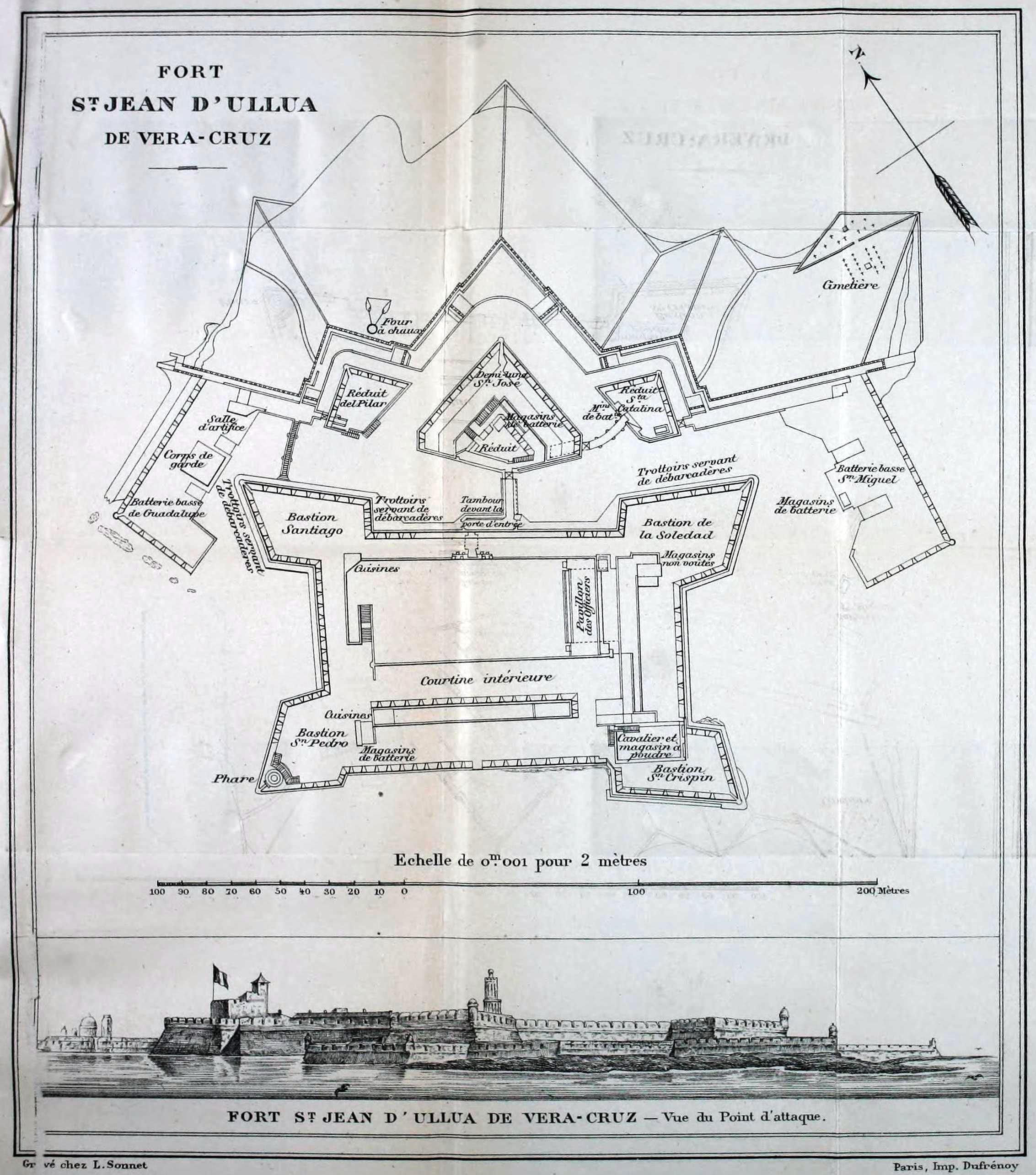
Plan and panorama of the fort of Saint-Jean de Ulloa in 1838

Vaillant was promoted to captain (capitaine de vaisseau) in 1838, and joined the expedition to Mexico later that year. After the stronghold of San Juan de Ulúa had been captured he was made its commander and was placed in command of the Vera Cruz station. He then joined the French blockade of the Río de la Plata, during which he occupied Montevideo. In May 1840 the explorer and botanist Aimé Bonpland met Vaillant, captain of the frigate Atalante in the Plata. He found Vaillant "polite but affected." At lunch on the ship Bonpland noticed evident hostility between Vaillant and Commodore Jean Dupotet.

Vaillant returned to France at his request due to disagreement with the Commodore and was given command of the Santi-Petri in the Levant station. On 17 April 1843 Vaillant married Zilia, sister of Baron André de Neuflize. After the February Revolution of 1848 he was appointed Maritime Prefect of the 4th maritime arrondissement, where he helped restore the peace. He then became premier conseil at the admiralty. On 1 May 1849 Vaillant was promoted to commodore (contre-amiral), and on 6 August 1849 was made second in command of the 2nd Mediterranean squadron, under Alexandre Ferdinand Parseval-Deschenes.

== Administrator ==
On 24 January 1851 Vaillant was appointed minister of marine. On 10 April 1851 he was replaced by Prosper de Chasseloup-Laubat. Later in 1851 Vaillant was made governor-general of the French West Indies and commander of the naval stations in the Antilles and the Gulf of Mexico. He then became governor of Martinique before having to return to France in 1853 due to poor health. He was promoted to rear-admiral (vice-amiral) in 1854. Auguste-Nicolas Vaillant died on 1 November 1858, aged 65.

== Work ==
- Voyage autour du monde execute sur la corvette la Bonite (11 vols., Paris, 1840–48).
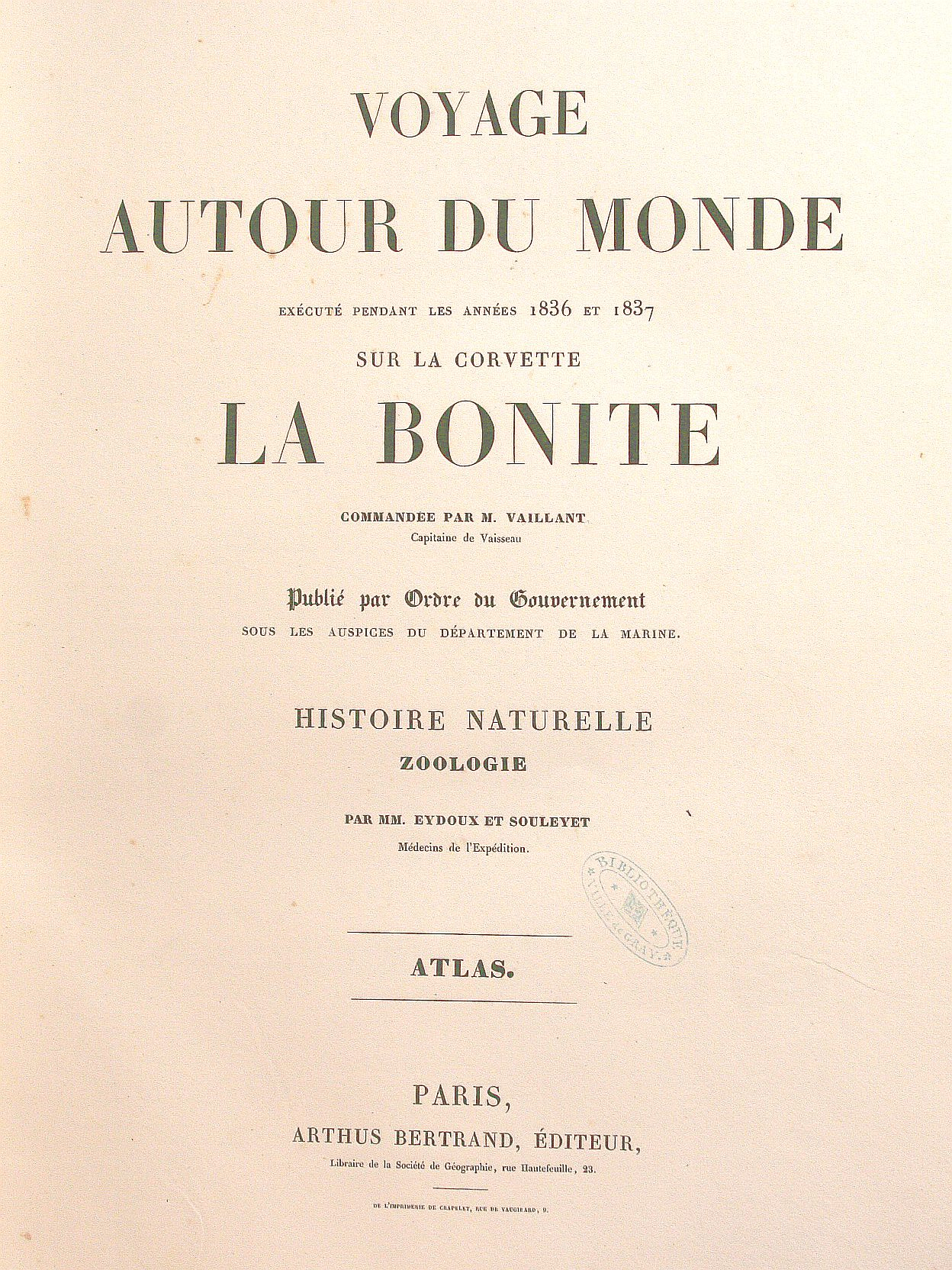
Cover page of account of the voyage of the Bonite

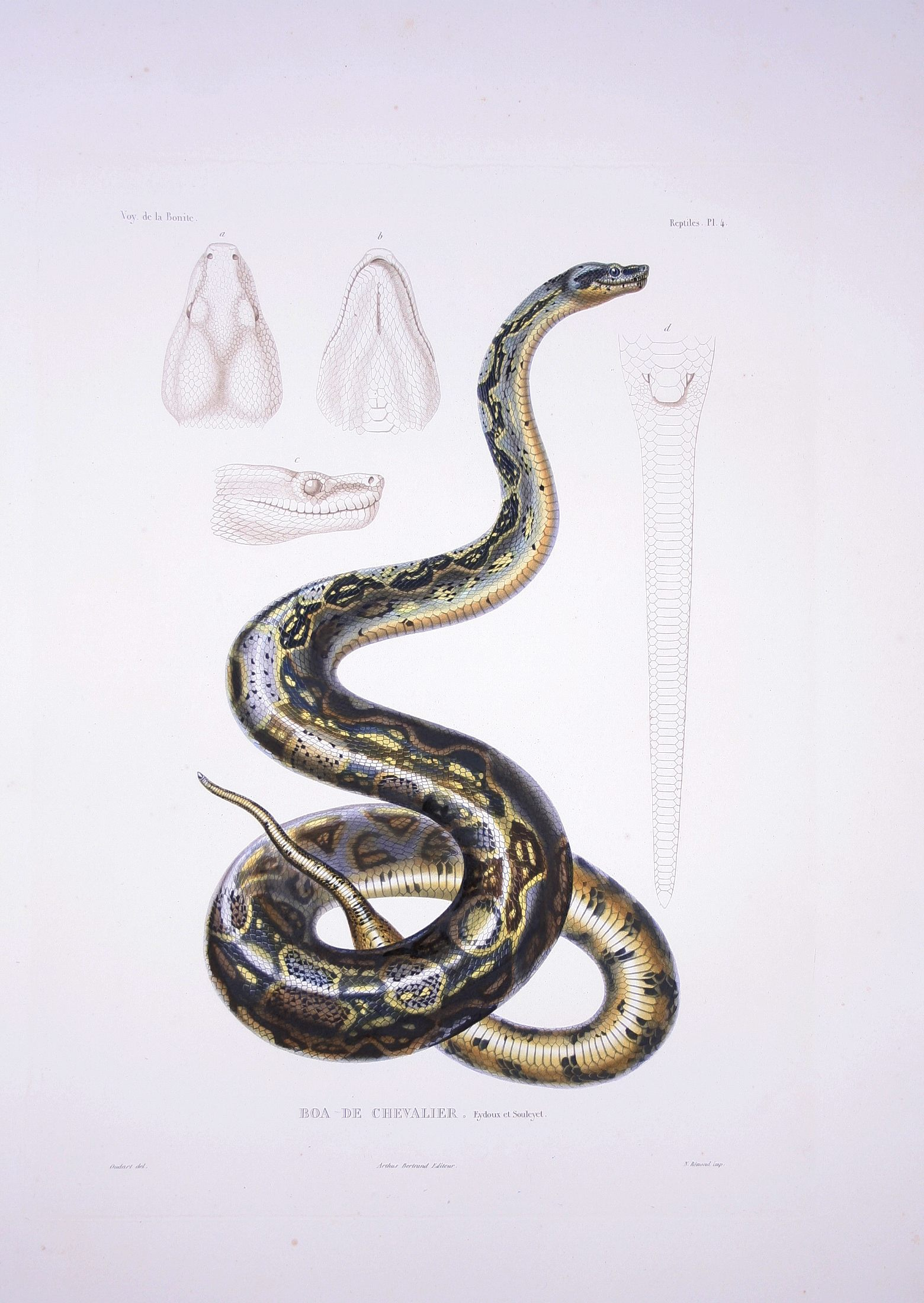
Boa constrictor

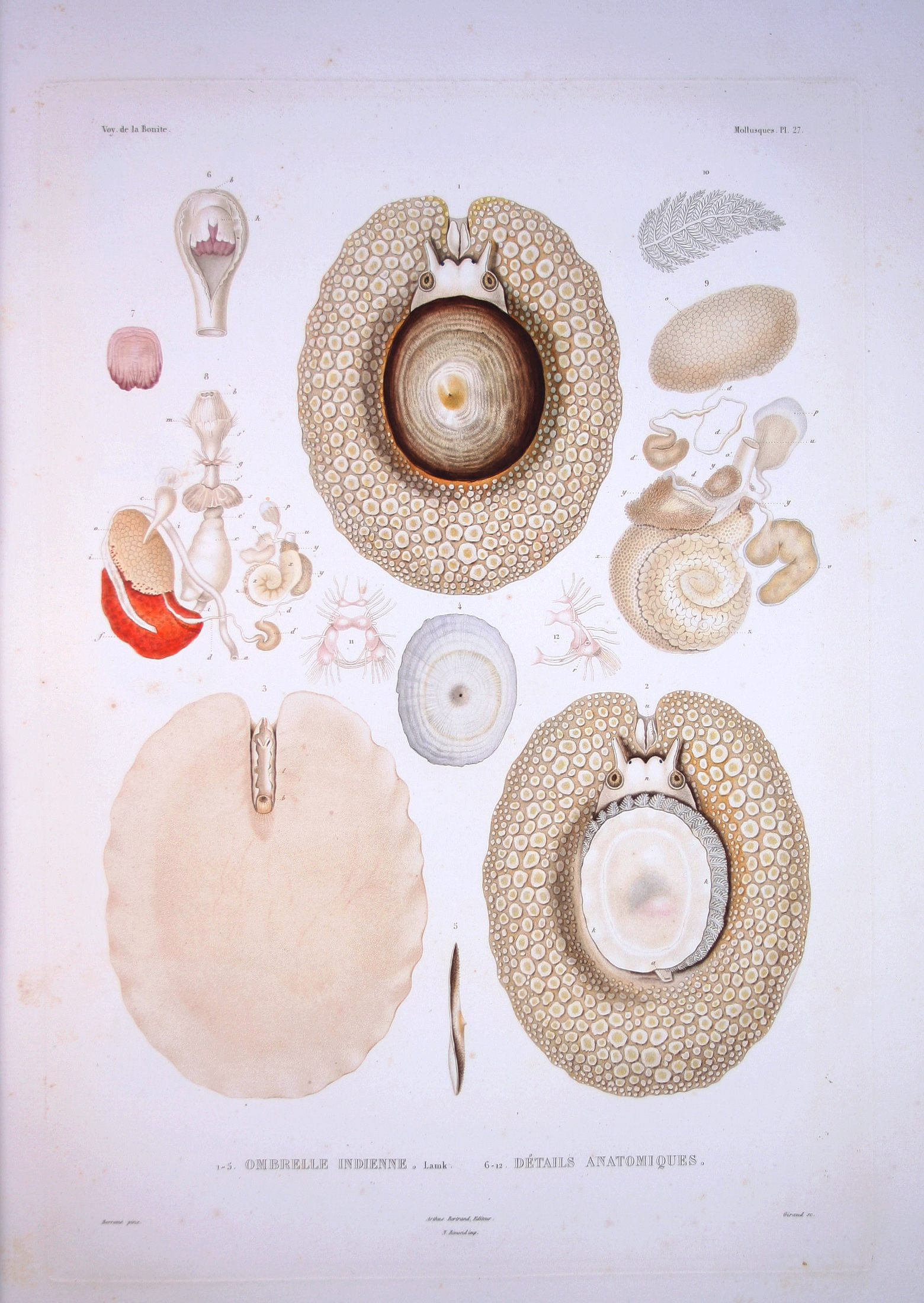
Molluscs

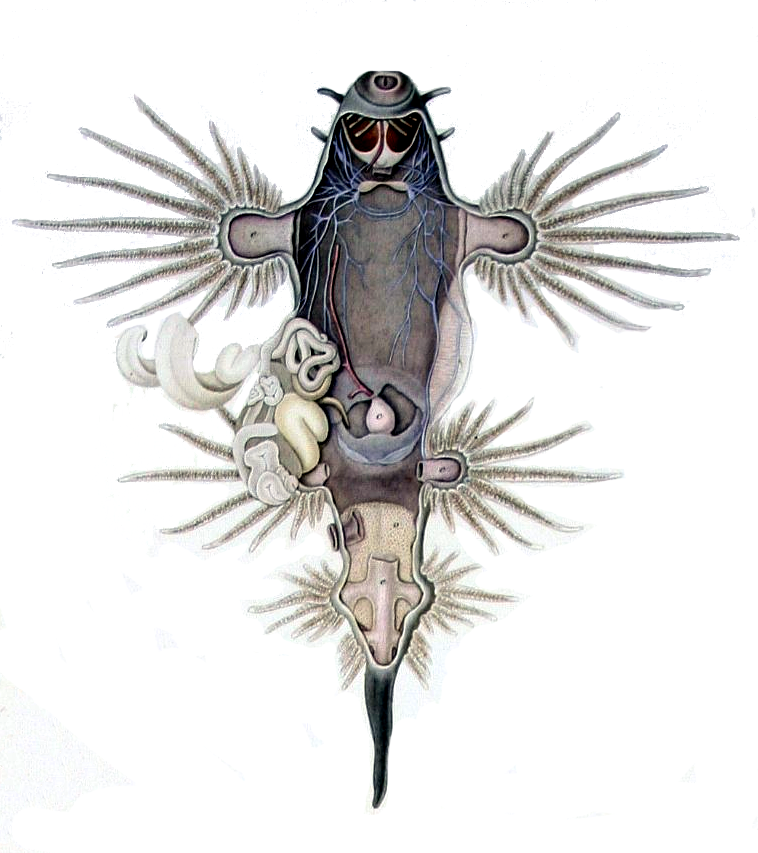
Dissected nudibranch Glaucus atlanticus

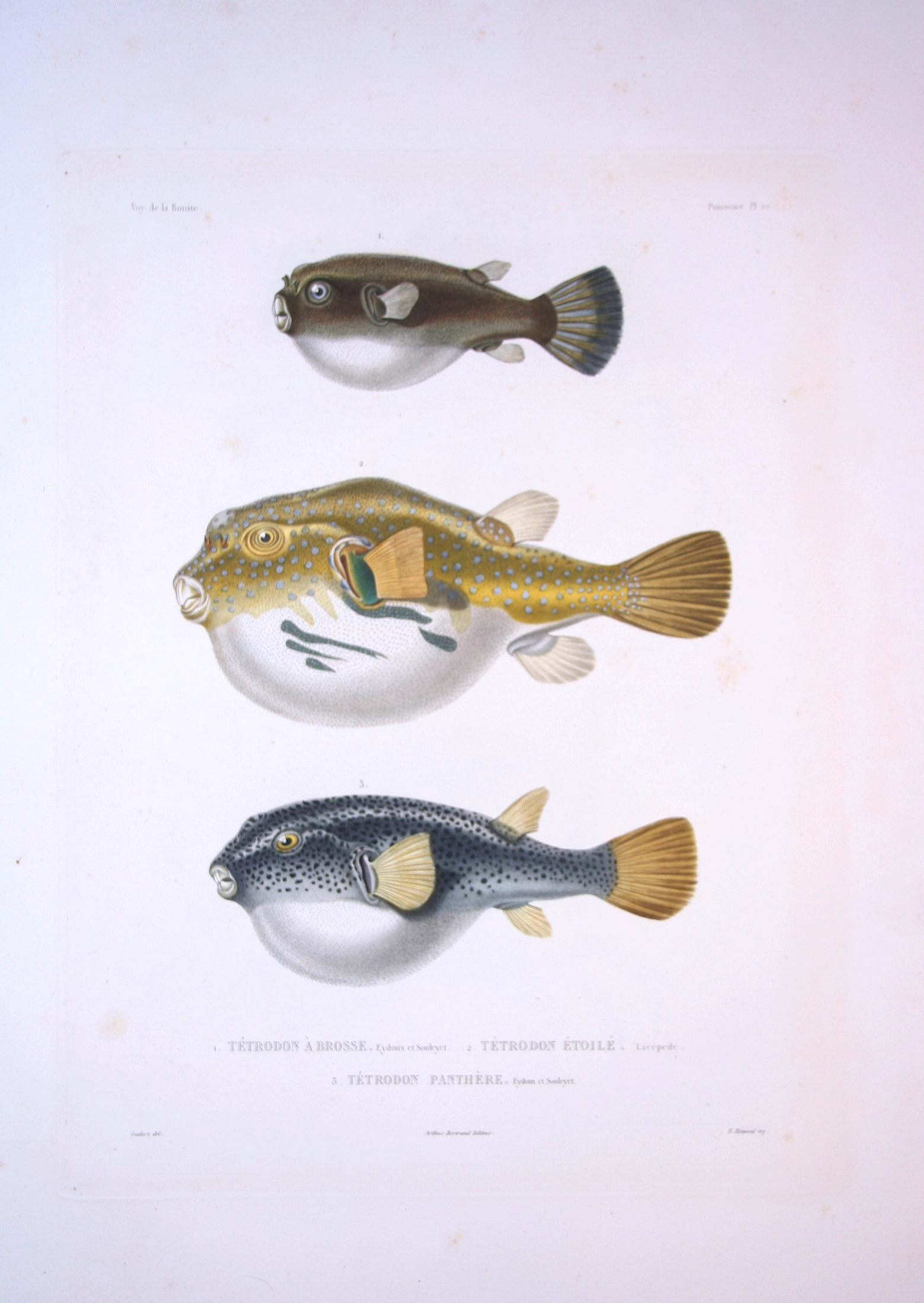
Arothron immaculatus, Arothron stellatus & Takifugu pardalis

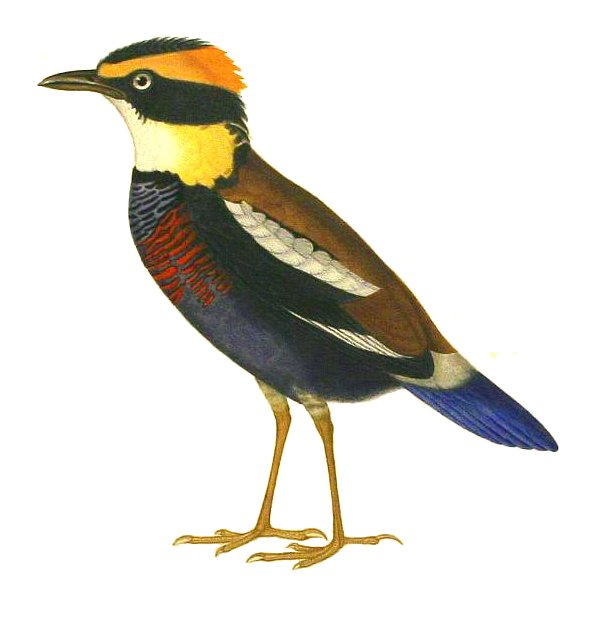
Elegant pitta

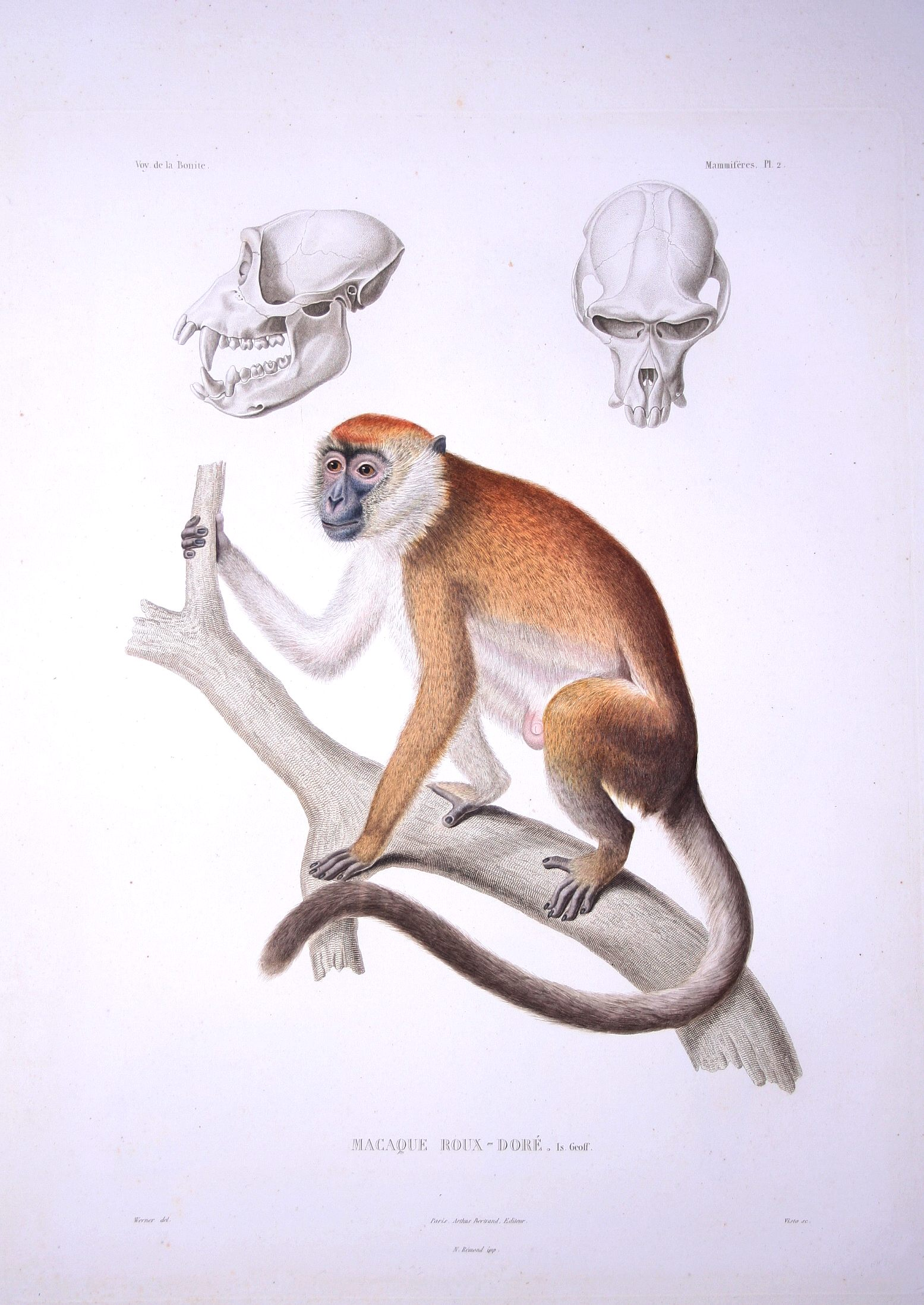
Red-Gold macaque
