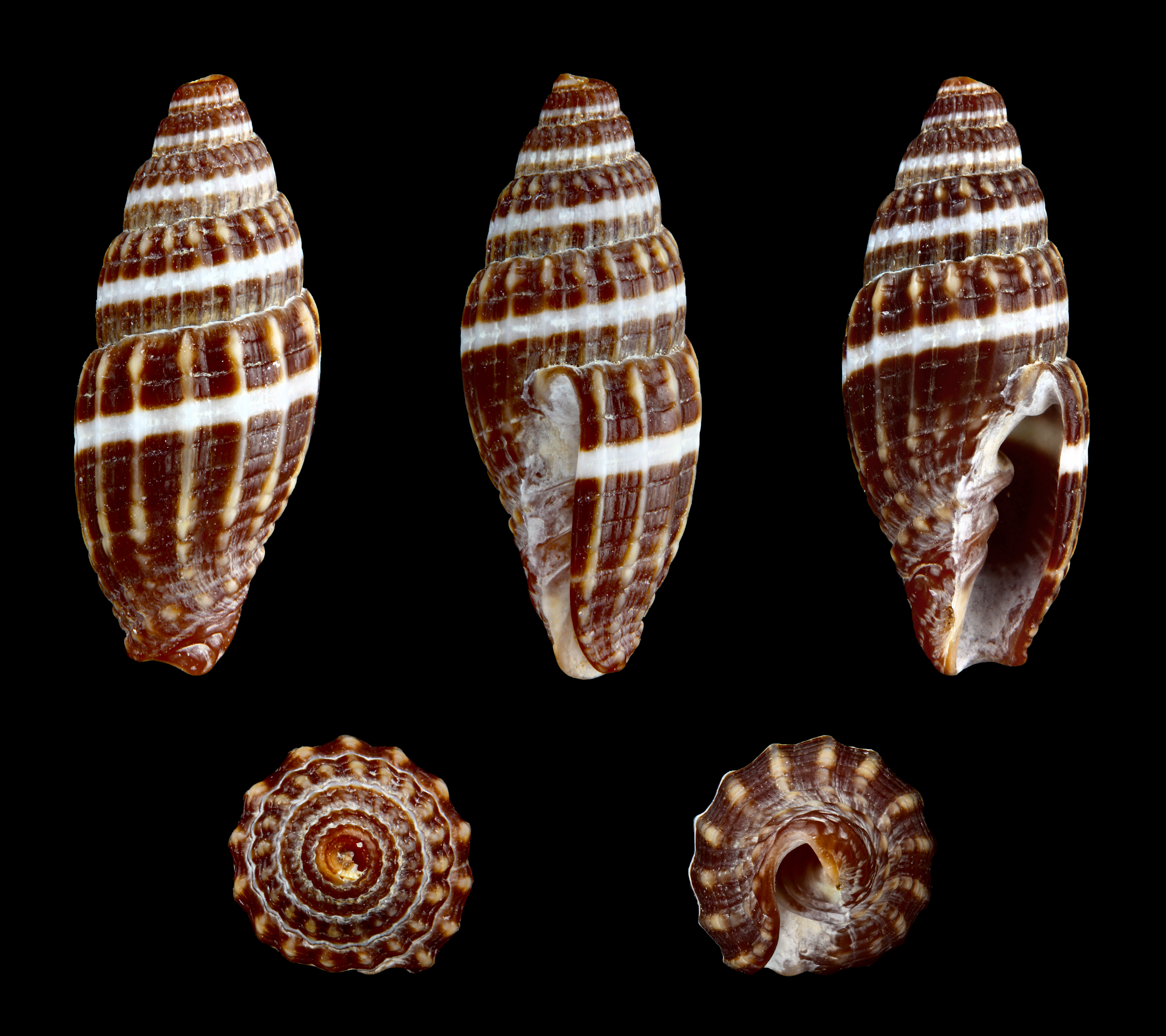

Scientific classification
- Kingdom: Animalia
- Phylum: Mollusca
- Class: Gastropoda
- Subclass: Caenogastropoda
- Order: Neogastropoda
- Superfamily: Turbinelloidea
- Family: Costellariidae
- Genus: Vexillum
- Species: V. radix

Binomial name
- Vexillum radix (G.B. Sowerby II & G.B. Sowerby III, 1874)

Synonyms
- Costellaria euthymiana (G.B. II Sowerby, 1874); Mitra euthymiana sensu Jousseaume Ms Dautzenberg & Bouge, 1923 (nomen nudum); Mitra radix G. B. Sowerby II, 1874 (original combination); Vexillum (Costellaria) radix (G. B. Sowerby II, 1874)

= Vexillum radix =

Species of gastropod

Vexillum radix is a species of small sea snail, marine gastropod mollusk in the family Costellariidae, the ribbed miters.

== Description ==
The length of the shell attains 31 mm.

The shell is similar to Vexillum obeliscus (Reeve, 1844), but the ribs are more distant and arcuate.

== Distribution ==
This marine species occurs in the Indo-West Pacific: off Mozambique and the Philippines; also off Australia (Queensland, Western Australia).
