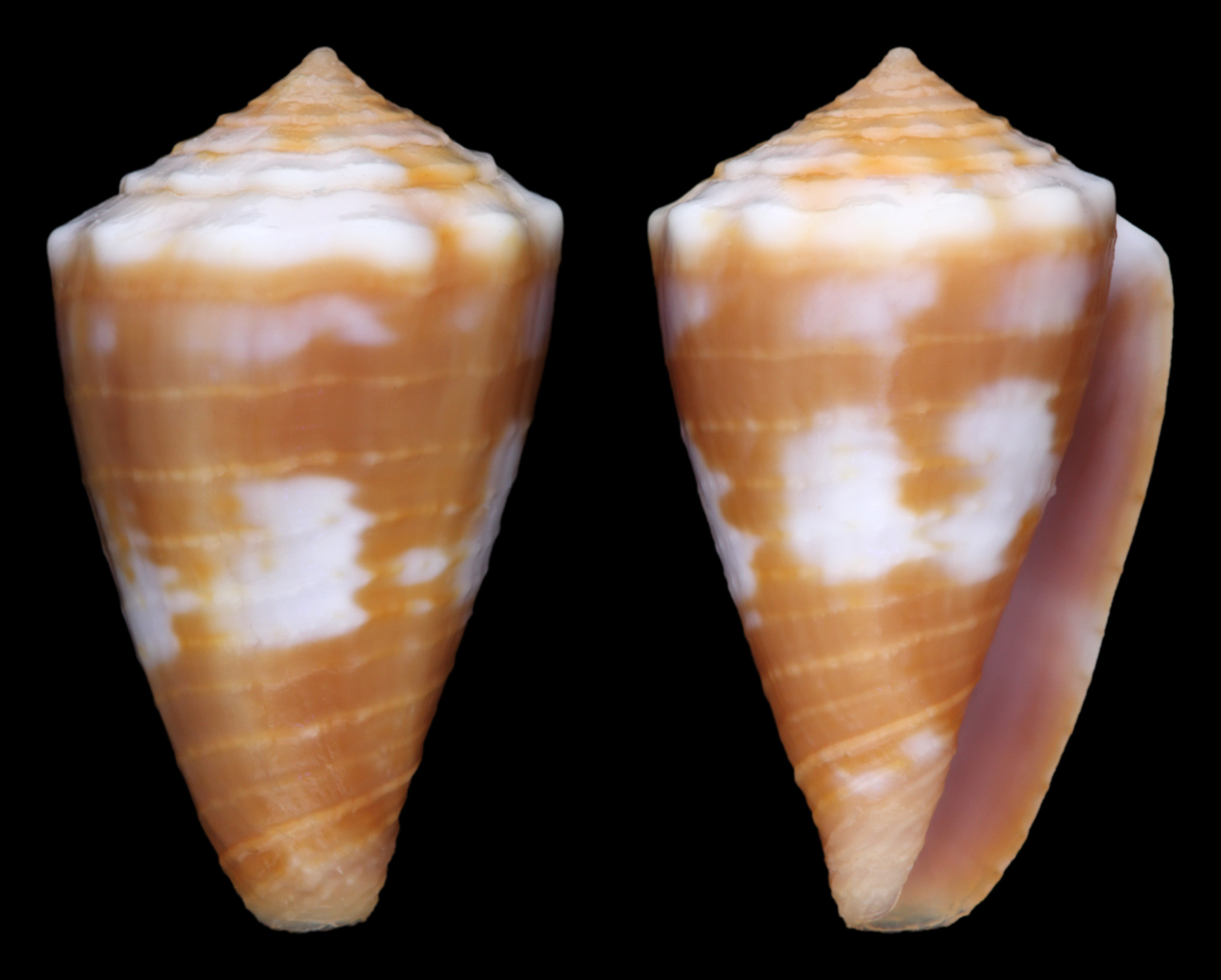
- Two views of a shell of Conus dianthus

Scientific classification
- Kingdom: Animalia
- Phylum: Mollusca
- Class: Gastropoda
- Subclass: Caenogastropoda
- Order: Neogastropoda
- Superfamily: Conoidea
- Family: Conidae
- Genus: Conus
- Species: C. dianthus

Binomial name
- Conus dianthus G. B. Sowerby III, 1882

Synonyms
- Conus (Dauciconus) dianthus G. B. Sowerby III, 1882 · accepted, alternate representation; Purpuriconus dianthus (G. B. Sowerby III, 1882)

= Conus dianthus =

Species of sea snail

Conus dianthus is a species of sea snail, a marine gastropod mollusk in the family Conidae, the cone snails, cone shells or cones.

These snails are predatory and venomous. They are capable of stinging humans.

== Description ==
The size of the shell varies between 22 mm and 28 mm. The shell is rather abbreviately conical, pale pink, with irregular patches of orange. It shows rather distant revolving ridges and faint longitudinal striae, undulating across the ribs and forming thereon minute scales. The body whorl is obscurely coronated. The aperture is pink within.
