= Cardiapoda richardi =

Scientific classification
- Kingdom: Animalia
- Phylum: Mollusca
- Class: Gastropoda
- Subclass: Caenogastropoda
- Order: Littorinimorpha
- Family: Carinariidae
- Genus: Cardiapoda
- Species: C. richardi

Binomial name
- Cardiapoda richardi Vayssière, 1903

Species of gastropod

Cardiapoda richardi is a species of sea gastropod, a holoplanktonic marine gastropod mollusk in the family Carinariidae.
