= Chicomurex superbus =

Scientific classification
- Kingdom: Animalia
- Phylum: Mollusca
- Class: Gastropoda
- Subclass: Caenogastropoda
- Order: Neogastropoda
- Family: Muricidae
- Genus: Chicomurex
- Species: C. superbus

Binomial name
- Chicomurex superbus (Sowerby III, 1889)

Synonyms
- Chicomurex problematicus (Lan, 1981); Chicoreus superbus (Sowerby III, 1889); Murex superbus Sowerby, 1889; Phyllonotus superbus (Sowerby, 1889); Phyllonotus superbus problematicus Lan, 1981 (original combination)

Species of gastropod

Chicomurex superbus, the superb murex, is a species of sea snail, a marine gastropod mollusk in the family Muricidae, the murex snails or rock snails.

== Description ==
The shell size varies between 40 mm and 85 mm with the average size being 62 mm

== Distribution ==
This species is found amongst seamounts and knolls in the Mascarene Basin, along North Queensland and Japan.
