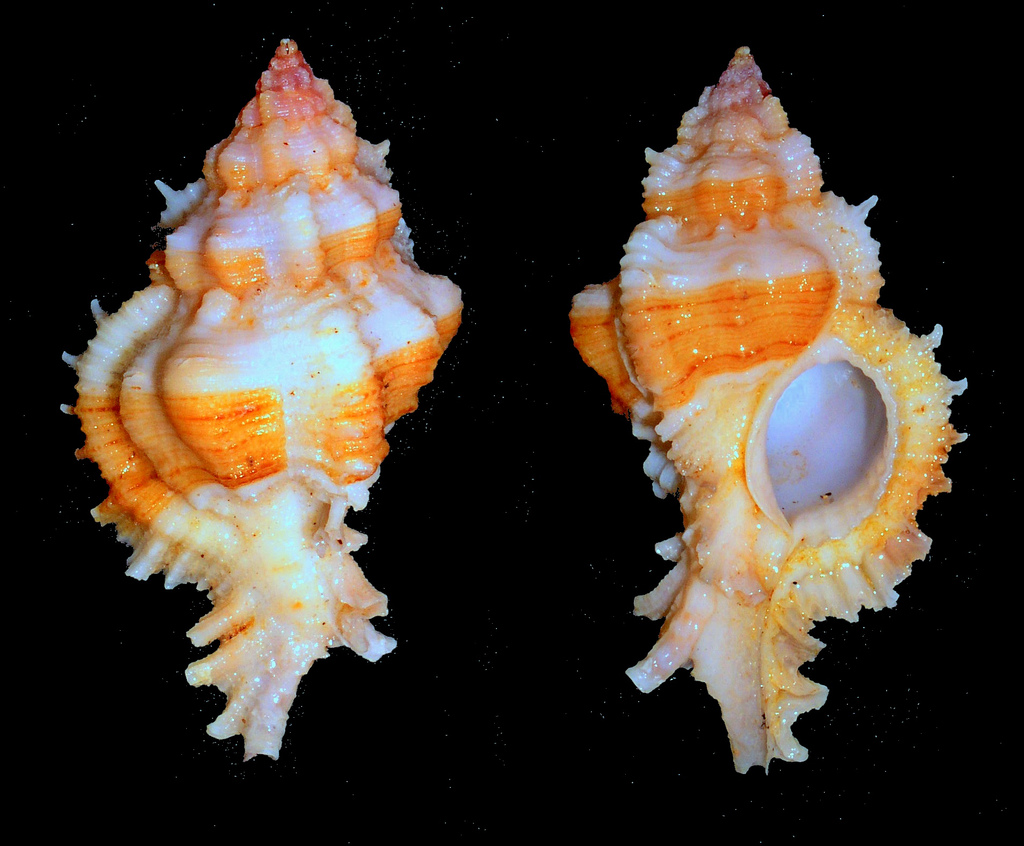
- Chicomurex venustulus

Scientific classification
- Kingdom: Animalia
- Phylum: Mollusca
- Class: Gastropoda
- Subclass: Caenogastropoda
- Order: Neogastropoda
- Superfamily: Muricoidea
- Family: Muricidae
- Subfamily: Muricinae
- Genus: Chicomurex; Arakawa, 1964{

Type species
- Murex superbus Sowerby III, 1889

Synonyms
- Chicoreus (Chicomurex) Arakawa, 1964

= Chicomurex =

Genus of gastropods

Chicomurex is a genus of sea snails, marine gastropod mollusks in the family Muricidae, the murex snails or rock snails.

== Species ==
Species within the genus Chicomurex include:

- Chicomurex elliscrossi (Fair, 1974)
- Chicomurex excelsus Houart, Moe & C. Chen, 2017
- Chicomurex globus Houart, Moe & C. Chen, 2015
- Chicomurex gloriosus (Shikama, 1977)
- Chicomurex laciniatus (Sowerby II, 1841)
- Chicomurex lani Houart, Moe & Chen, 2014
- Chicomurex protoglobosus Houart, 1992
- Chicomurex pseudosuperbus Houart, Moe & C. Chen, 2015
- Chicomurex ritae Houart, 2013
- Chicomurex rosadoi Houart, 1999
- Chicomurex superbus (Sowerby III, 1889)
- Chicomurex tagaroae Houart, 2013
- Chicomurex turschi (Houart, 1981)
- Chicomurex vaulberti Houart & Lorenz, 2020
- Chicomurex venustulus (Rehder & Wilson, 1975)

Species brought into synonymy

- Chicomurex problematicus (Lan, 1981): synonym of Chicomurex superbus (G. B. Sowerby III, 1889)
