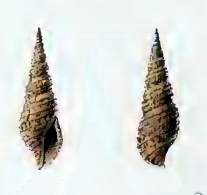
- Original image of a shell of Daphnella elata

Scientific classification
- Kingdom: Animalia
- Phylum: Mollusca
- Class: Gastropoda
- Subclass: Caenogastropoda
- Order: Neogastropoda
- Superfamily: Conoidea
- Family: Raphitomidae
- Genus: Daphnella
- Species: D. elata

Binomial name
- Daphnella elata G.B. Sowerby III, 1893

= Daphnella elata =

Species of gastropod

Daphnella elata is a species of sea snail, a marine gastropod mollusk in the family Raphitomidae.

== Description ==
The length of the shell attains 15 mm, its diameter 4 mm.

The spiraled, turreted shell has a whitish golden yellow color with many light brown spots. The sharp spire is much longer than others in this genus. The shell contains 10 whorls of which two smooth, brown whorls in the protoconch. The subsequent whorls are slightly angulated. The body whorl has about the same length as the spire. It is slightly convex and constricted below the middle. The aperture is oblong and small. The outer lip is crenulated. The sinus has a very short notch at the edge. The siphonal canal is very short.

== Distribution ==
This species occurs in the Indian Ocean off Mauritius.
