= Marginella bicatenata =

Scientific classification
- Kingdom: Animalia
- Phylum: Mollusca
- Class: Gastropoda
- Subclass: Caenogastropoda
- Order: Neogastropoda
- Family: Marginellidae
- Genus: Marginella
- Species: M. bicatenata

Binomial name
- Marginella bicatenata G. B. Sowerby III, 1914

Synonyms
- Marginella tomlini Shackleford, 1916<

Species of gastropod

Marginella bicatenata is a species of sea snail, a marine gastropod mollusk in the family Marginellidae, the margin snails.
