= Mangelia verrucosa =

Scientific classification
- Kingdom: Animalia
- Phylum: Mollusca
- Class: Gastropoda
- Subclass: Caenogastropoda
- Order: Neogastropoda
- Superfamily: Conoidea
- Family: Mangeliidae
- Genus: Mangelia
- Species: M. verrucosa

Binomial name
- Mangelia verrucosa (G.B. Sowerby III, 1897)

Synonyms
- Clathurella verrucosa G.B. Sowerby III, 1897; Mangilia verrucosa G.B. Sowerby III, 1897

Species of gastropod

Mangelia verrucosa is a species of sea snail, a marine gastropod mollusk in the family Mangeliidae.

This is a taxon inquirendum. G.B. Sowerby III described this species as Clathurella verrucosa, previously erroneously referred as Mangelia clathrata M. de Serres. K.H. Barnard mentioned in 1958 Mangilia verrucosa Sowerby III with 11–14 axial ribs (compared to Mangilia minuscula E.A. Smith, 1910)

== Description ==
The length of the shell attains 3.1 mm.

== Distribution ==
This marine species occurs off Port Elizabeth, South Africa.
