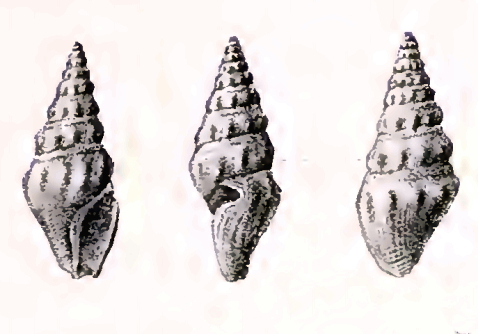
- Original image of a shell of Drillia lignaria

Scientific classification
- Kingdom: Animalia
- Phylum: Mollusca
- Class: Gastropoda
- Subclass: Caenogastropoda
- Order: Neogastropoda
- Superfamily: Conoidea
- Family: Drilliidae
- Genus: Drillia
- Species: D. lignaria

Binomial name
- Drillia lignaria (G.B. Sowerby III, 1903)

Synonyms
- Pleurotoma (Clavus) lignaria G.B. Sowerby III, 1903; Turris lignaria (G.B. Sowerby III, 1903)

= Drillia lignaria =

Species of gastropod

Drillia lignaria is a species of sea snail, a marine gastropod mollusk in the family Drilliidae.

== Description ==
The shell grows to a length of 22 mm, its diameter 9 mm.

The shell has an irregularly fusiform shape. it is pallid, without colour markings. It is obtusely angular, posterior acuminated, anterior rather obliquely subconical. It resembles closely Comitas stolida (Hinds, 1843), but is more compact in shape. The spire is less tapering, the siphonal canal is shorter and the rostrum is blunter. The spire is rather long and acute. It contains 10 1/2 whorls. The first two are smooth, rounded and forming a papillary apex. The next two whorls are slightly convex and nearly smooth. The rest have the upper half slightly concave, with a rounded slightly tubercular ridge just below the suture. The lower are rather convex, furnished with a row of oblong nodules, or short stout costae (9 on the penultimate whorl). The whorls are crossed by oblique axial ribs, 10 on the first whorl (as preserved, possibly this is the 2nd), increasing to 11 (12) on the body whorl. They are very finely spirally striated throughout. The whorl equals in length to the spire. It is obtusely angled. Its left side is obliquely sloping, the right side is rather convex. There is no rostrum. The nodules at the angles are produced downwards so as to form slightly oblique stout rounded ribs. The aperture is rather shor. The whitish columella is nearly straight, slightly rimate at the rostrum and covered by a thin callus which is somewhat thickened above. The outer lip is slightly arcuate. The siphonal canal is very short. The anal sinus is deep and moderately wide, situated at the angle of the whorl.

== Distribution ==
This species occurs in the demersal zone off the west coast of the Cape Province, South Africa.
