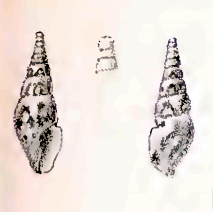
- Oirignal image of a shell of Splendrillia gratiosa

Scientific classification
- Kingdom: Animalia
- Phylum: Mollusca
- Class: Gastropoda
- Subclass: Caenogastropoda
- Order: Neogastropoda
- Superfamily: Conoidea
- Family: Drilliidae
- Genus: Splendrillia
- Species: S. gratiosa

Binomial name
- Splendrillia gratiosa (G.B. Sowerby III, 1896)

Synonyms
- Antimelatoma gratiosa (Sowerby III, 1897); Drillia gratiosa Sowerby III, 1896; Melatoma gratiosa (Sowerby III, 1897)

= Splendrillia gratiosa =

Species of gastropod

Splendrillia gratiosa is a species of sea snail, a marine gastropod mollusk in the family Drilliidae.

== Description ==
The length of the shell attains 17.5 mm, its diameter 6 mm.

This is a smooth shell, pink, with longitudinal red flames. tTe spire is acutely elongate, but the apex is blunt and papillary. The shell contains 9 slightly convex whorls. The suture is impressed. The body whorl is very short and slightly inflated. The aperture is ovate. The columella is sinuate. The outer lip is sharp.

== Distribution ==
This marine species is endemic to Australia and occurs off South Australia.
