= Marginella lineolata =

Scientific classification
- Kingdom: Animalia
- Phylum: Mollusca
- Class: Gastropoda
- Subclass: Caenogastropoda
- Order: Neogastropoda
- Family: Marginellidae
- Genus: Marginella
- Species: M. lineolata

Binomial name
- Marginella lineolata G. B. Sowerby III, 1886

Species of gastropod

Marginella lineolata is a species of sea snail, a marine gastropod mollusk in the family Marginellidae, the margin snails.

== Description ==
The shells are generally between 20 and 40 mm in size.
