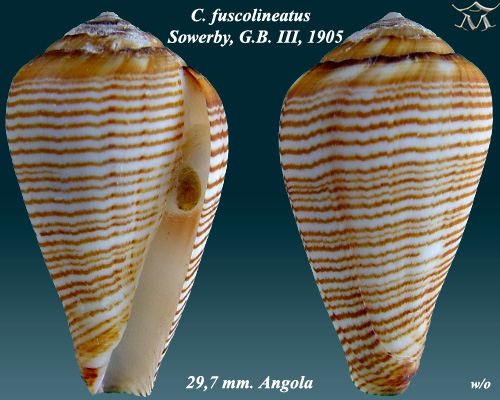
- Apertural and abapertural views of shell of Conus fuscolineatus Sowerby, G.B. III, 1905

Scientific classification
- Kingdom: Animalia
- Phylum: Mollusca
- Class: Gastropoda
- Subclass: Caenogastropoda
- Order: Neogastropoda
- Superfamily: Conoidea
- Family: Conidae
- Genus: Conus
- Species: C. fuscolineatus

Binomial name
- Conus fuscolineatus G. B. Sowerby III, 1905

Synonyms
- Conus (Lautoconus) fuscolineatus G. B. Sowerby III, 1905; Varioconus fuscolineatus Sowerby, G.B. III, 1905

= Conus fuscolineatus =

Species of sea snail

Conus fuscolineatus is a species of sea snail, a marine gastropod mollusk in the family Conidae, the cone snails and their allies.

Like all species within the genus Conus, these snails are predatory and venomous. They are capable of stinging humans, therefore live ones should be handled carefully or not at all.

== Description ==
The size of an adult shell varies between 15 mm and 40 mm. Its shell is ovate-turbinate, smooth and whitish with narrow, dark, transverse lines. It is ornamented at the apex and painted with large, brown, irregular spots. Its spire is very short and obtuse. The aperture of the shell is moderately wide, and broadly triple-banded inside.

== Distribution ==
This species occurs in the Eastern Atlantic Ocean from Guinea to Angola, and in the Mediterranean Sea.

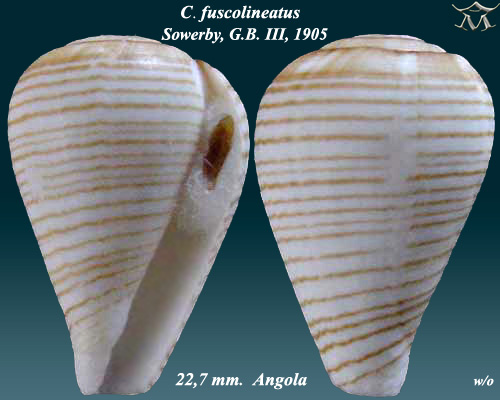
Conus fuscolineatus Sowerby, G.B. III, 1905

== Gallery ==
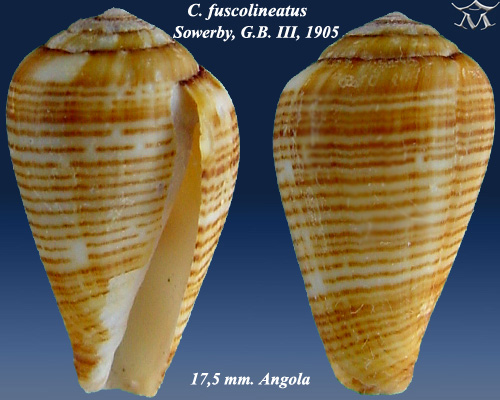
Conus fuscolineatus Sowerby, G.B. III, 1905

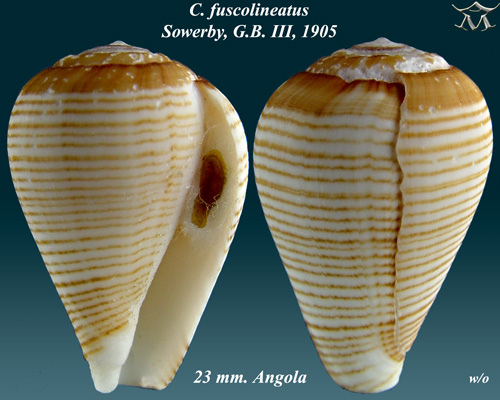
Conus fuscolineatus Sowerby, G.B. III, 1905

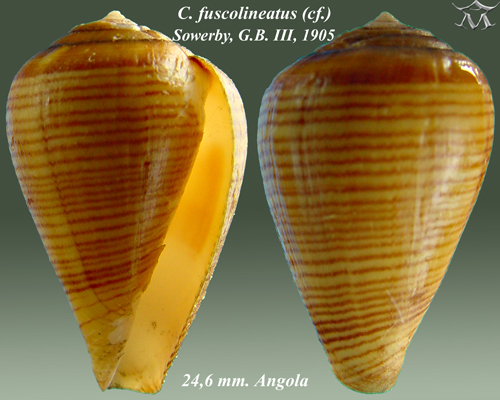
Conus fuscolineatus Sowerby, G.B. III, 1905
