= Mangelia louisensis =

Scientific classification
- Kingdom: Animalia
- Phylum: Mollusca
- Class: Gastropoda
- Subclass: Caenogastropoda
- Order: Neogastropoda
- Superfamily: Conoidea
- Family: Mangeliidae
- Genus: Mangelia
- Species: M. louisensis

Binomial name
- Mangelia louisensis (G.B. Sowerby III, 1894)

Synonyms
- Mangilia louisensis G.B. Sowerby III, 1894 (original description)

Species of gastropod

Mangelia louisensis is a species of sea snail, a marine gastropod mollusk in the family Mangeliidae.

== Distribution ==
This marine species occurs off Mauritius.
