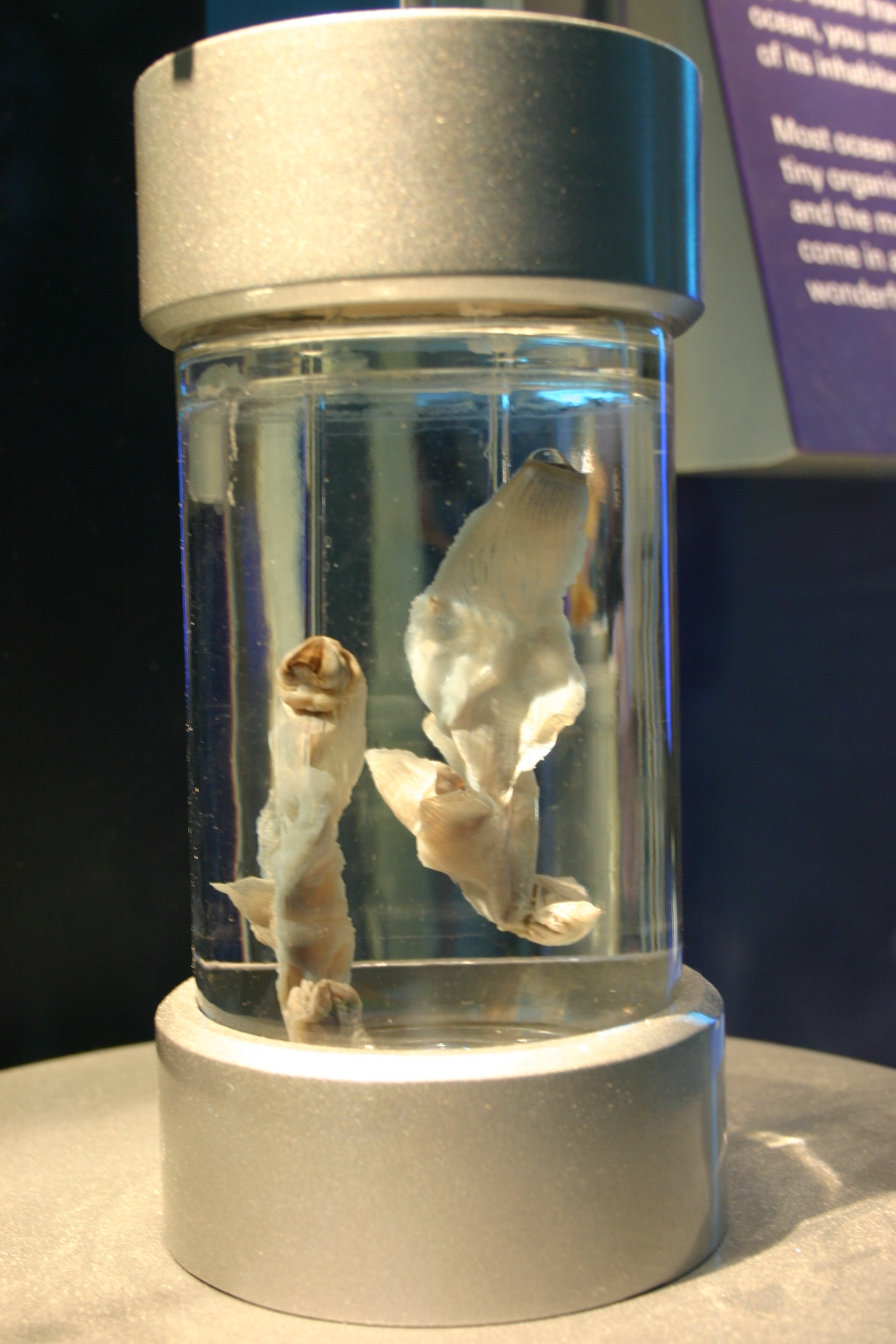
- Preserved Carinaria lamarckii

Scientific classification
- Kingdom: Animalia
- Phylum: Mollusca
- Class: Gastropoda
- Subclass: Caenogastropoda
- Order: Littorinimorpha
- Family: Carinariidae
- Genus: Carinaria
- Species: C. lamarckii

Binomial name
- Carinaria lamarckii Blainville, 1817

Synonyms
- Carinaria lamarcki Péron & Lesueur, 1810 (vernacular name only, not latinized till Blainville, 1817)

= Carinaria lamarckii =

Species of gastropod

Carinaria lamarckii is a species of sea gastropod, a holoplanktonic marine gastropod mollusk in the family Carinariidae.

== Description ==
Carinaria lamarckii is a large mollusc that is roughly 25 centimetres (9.8 in) long. It has a delicate transparent shell around 4.5 centimetres (1.8 in) long, with a curved apex. The shell is too small for the snail to retract into, and covers only the gills.

== Habitat ==
The minimum recorded depth is 0 m. The maximum recorded depth is 675 m.

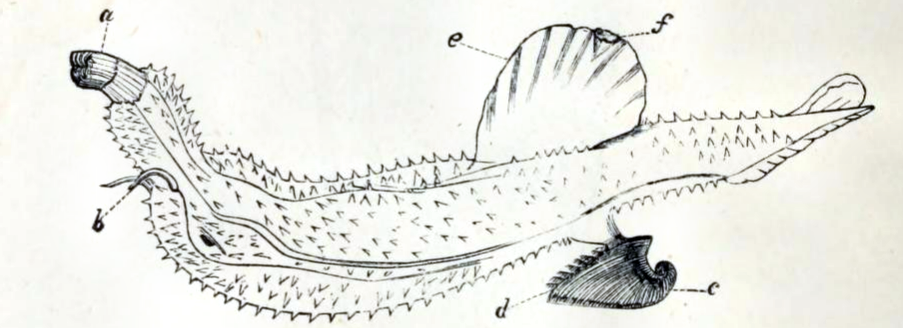
A drawing of Carinaria lamarcki; a) proboscis b) tentacles c) shell d) gills e) foot f) sucker
