= George Brettingham Sowerby =

George Brettingham Sowerby may refer to:

- George Brettingham Sowerby I (1788–1854), British naturalist, illustrator and conchologist
- George Brettingham Sowerby II (1812–1884), his son, British naturalist, illustrator, and conchologist
- George Brettingham Sowerby III (1843–1921), his son, British conchologist, publisher, and illustrator
