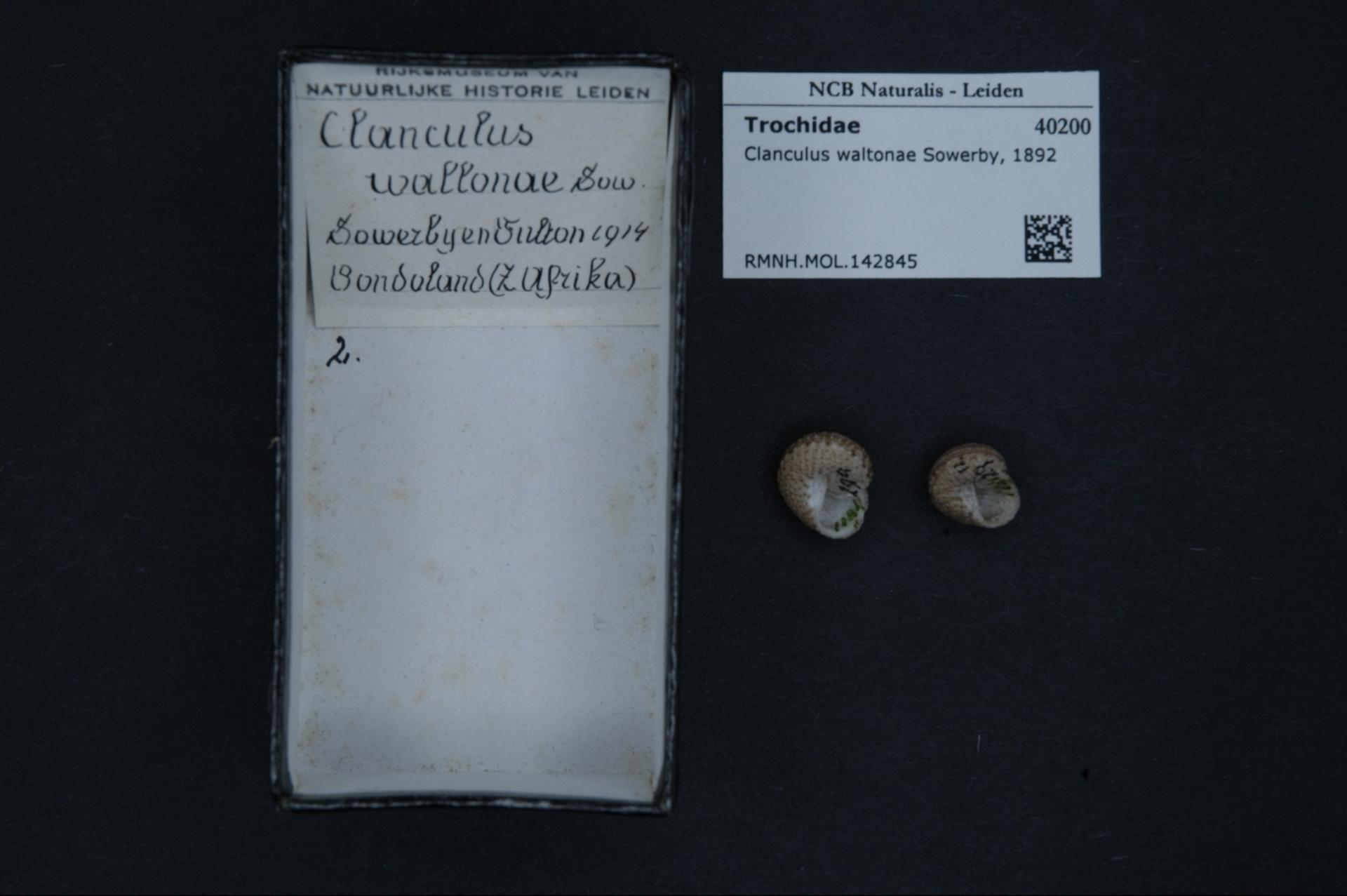
- Clanculus waltonae Sowerby, 1892

Scientific classification
- Kingdom: Animalia
- Phylum: Mollusca
- Class: Gastropoda
- Subclass: Vetigastropoda
- Order: Trochida
- Superfamily: Trochoidea
- Family: Trochidae
- Genus: Clanculus
- Species: C. waltonae

Binomial name
- Clanculus waltonae Sowerby III, 1892

Synonyms
- Clanculus (Clanculopsis) waltonae G.B. Sowerby, 1892; Clanculus miniatus auct.

= Clanculus waltonae =

Species of gastropod

Clanculus waltonae is a species of sea snail, a marine gastropod mollusk in the family Trochidae, the top snails.

== Description ==
The shell may attain a height of 10 mm.

== Distribution ==
This marine species occurs off False Bay to East London, South Africa.
