= Carinaria pseudorugosa =

Scientific classification
- Kingdom: Animalia
- Phylum: Mollusca
- Class: Gastropoda
- Subclass: Caenogastropoda
- Order: Littorinimorpha
- Family: Carinariidae
- Genus: Carinaria
- Species: C. pseudorugosa

Binomial name
- Carinaria pseudorugosa Vayssière, 1904

Synonyms
- Carinaria challengeri Bonnevie, 1920; Carinaria lamarcki var. challengeri Bonnevie, 1920

Species of gastropod

Carinaria pseudorugosa is a species of sea gastropod, a holoplanktonic marine gastropod mollusk in the family Carinariidae.

== Distribution ==
This marine species occurs in the Atlantic Ocean, on the Mid Atlantic Ridge west of the Azores

== Description ==
The maximum recorded shell length is 40 mm.

== Habitat ==
Minimum recorded depth is 0 m. Maximum recorded depth is 150 m.
