= Splendrillia solicitata =

Scientific classification
- Kingdom: Animalia
- Phylum: Mollusca
- Class: Gastropoda
- Subclass: Caenogastropoda
- Order: Neogastropoda
- Superfamily: Conoidea
- Family: Drilliidae
- Genus: Splendrillia
- Species: S. solicitata

Binomial name
- Splendrillia solicitata (Sowerby III, 1913)

Synonyms
- Drillia solicitata Sowerby III, 1913

Species of gastropod

Splendrillia solicitata is a species of sea snail, a marine gastropod mollusk in the family Drilliidae.

== Distribution ==
This marine species occurs off Japan and New Caledonia.
