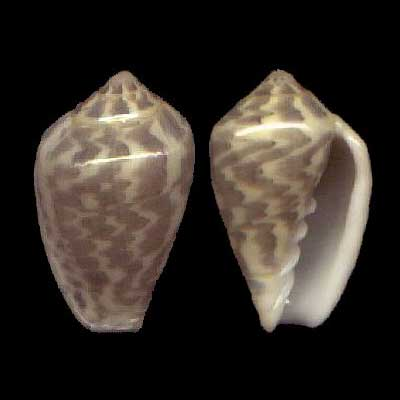
- Apertural (right) and abapertural (left) views of a shell of M. bairstowi

Scientific classification
- Kingdom: Animalia
- Phylum: Mollusca
- Class: Gastropoda
- Subclass: Caenogastropoda
- Order: Neogastropoda
- Family: Marginellidae
- Genus: Marginella
- Species: M. bairstowi

Binomial name
- Marginella bairstowi G. B. Sowerby III, 1886

= Marginella bairstowi =

Species of gastropod

Marginella bairstowi is a species of sea snail, a marine gastropod mollusk in the family Marginellidae, the margin snails.
