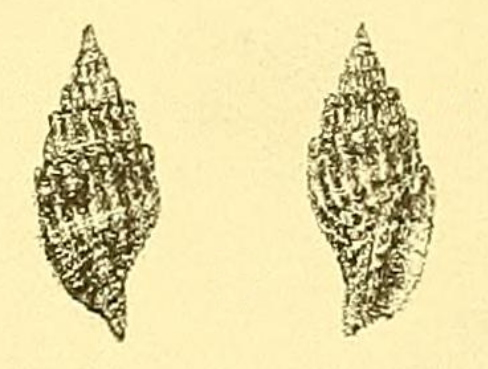
- Shell of Vexillum recurvirostris (holotype)

Scientific classification
- Kingdom: Animalia
- Phylum: Mollusca
- Class: Gastropoda
- Subclass: Caenogastropoda
- Order: Neogastropoda
- Superfamily: Turbinelloidea
- Family: Costellariidae
- Genus: Vexillum
- Species: V. recurvirostris

Binomial name
- Vexillum recurvirostris (Sowerby III, 1908)

Synonyms
- Mitra recurva G. B. Sowerby III, 1889 junior homonym (invalid: junior homonym of Mitra recurva Reeve, 1845; Mitra recurvirostris is a replacement name; Mitra recurvirostris G. B. Sowerby III, 1908 superseded combination; Pusia recurvirostris (G. B. Sowerby III, 1908); Vexillum (Pusia) recurvirostris (G. B. Sowerby III, 1908)

= Vexillum recurvirostris =

Species of gastropod

Vexillum recurvirostris is a species of small sea snail, marine gastropod mollusk in the family Costellariidae, the ribbed miters.

== Description ==
The length of the shell attains 16 mm, its diameter 6 mm.

(Original description) A very pretty little fusiform shell, with a prolonged recurved siphonal canal. The shell contains 10 whorls, angled at the top, then very slightly convex. The numerous longitudinal ribs are neatly tubercled at the suture, the interstices transversely grooved, and the turreted, acute spire produced and attenuated towards the apex. The shell is white with brown blotches for the most part arranged in two zones above and below the middle of the body whorl. The columella is sinuous, five-plaited, protected on top by a rounded white tubercle. The aperture is long, anteriorly narrowed, inside brown-spotted. The thin outer lip is transparent.

== Distribution ==
This marine species occurs off Mozambique.
