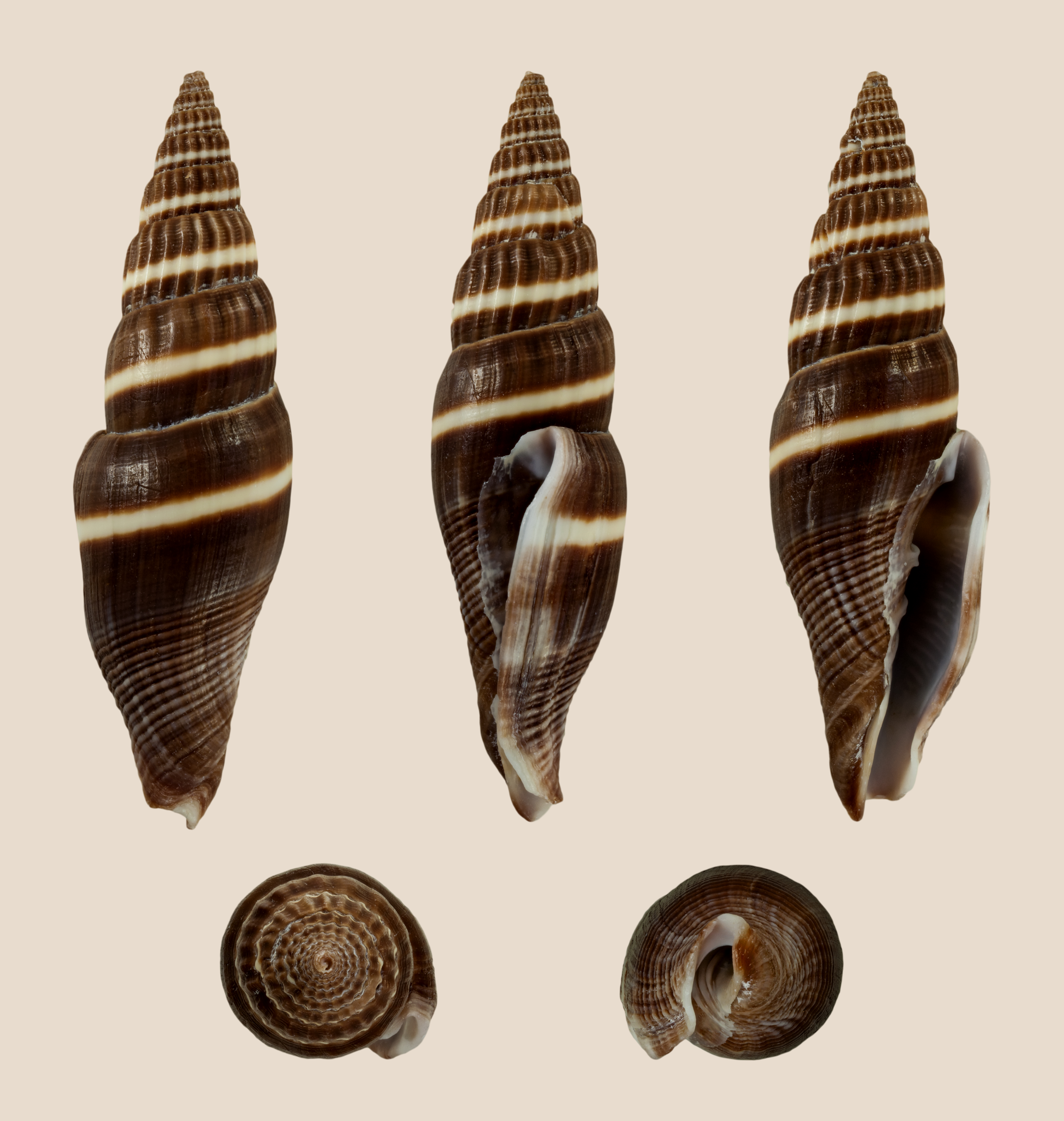
- Vexillum formosense

Scientific classification
- Kingdom: Animalia
- Phylum: Mollusca
- Class: Gastropoda
- Subclass: Caenogastropoda
- Order: Neogastropoda
- Superfamily: Turbinelloidea
- Family: Costellariidae
- Genus: Vexillum
- Species: V. formosense

Binomial name
- Vexillum formosense (Sowerby III, 1889)

Synonyms
- Mitra formosensis G. B. Sowerby III, 1889 (original combination); Vexillum (Vexillum) formosense (G. B. Sowerby III, 1889)

= Vexillum formosense =

Species of gastropod

Vexillum formosense is a species of small sea snail, marine gastropod mollusk in the family Costellariidae, the ribbed miters.

== Description ==
The length of the shell attains 57 mm, its diameter 16 mm.

The narrow shell has a fusiform shape. It is dark brown with white spiral bands (sometimes carrying a red thread). The spire is elongate and sharp. The shell contains 11 slightly convex whorls. The distinct suture is slightly constricted. The first 8-9 whorls are longitudinally ribbed, spirally multisulcate, then spirally striated. These spirals become rather weak on the last half of the body whorl. The body whorl is shorter in proportion to the spire and is contracted at the base. It is roundly convex, decorated with a white band above and below the middle, very narrow below the middle, ending in a short tail, spirally lirate. The brown columella has five, cream plaits. The interior of the aperture is violet. The outer lip is thick, smooth and borderd with dark purple-brown.

== Distribution ==
This marine species occurs off Vietnam, the Philippines, Taiwan, South China Sea, the Solomon Islands and Fiji.
