= Vexillum subquadratum =

Scientific classification
- Kingdom: Animalia
- Phylum: Mollusca
- Class: Gastropoda
- Subclass: Caenogastropoda
- Order: Neogastropoda
- Superfamily: Turbinelloidea
- Family: Costellariidae
- Genus: Vexillum
- Species: V. subquadratum

Binomial name
- Vexillum subquadratum (Sowerby II & Sowerby III, 1874)

Synonyms
- Mitra subquadrata G. B. Sowerby II, 1874 · unaccepted (original combination); Vexillum (Costellaria) subquadratum (G. B. Sowerby II, 1874) ·

Species of gastropod

Vexillum subquadratum is a species of small sea snail, marine gastropod mollusk in the family Costellariidae, the ribbed miters.

== Description ==
The shell attains a length of 23 mm.

== Distribution ==
This marine species occurs in the Red Sea and in the Indo-Pacific off Mauritius and the Philippines through to Polynesia and Hawaii.
