= Cardiapoda placenta =

Scientific classification
- Kingdom: Animalia
- Phylum: Mollusca
- Class: Gastropoda
- Subclass: Caenogastropoda
- Order: Littorinimorpha
- Family: Carinariidae
- Genus: Cardiapoda
- Species: C. placenta

Binomial name
- Cardiapoda placenta (Lesson, 1830)

Synonyms
- Pterotrachea placenta Lesson, 1831; Carinaroides placenta (Lesson, 1831); Carinaroida placenta (Lesson, 1831); Cardiapoda pedunculata d'Orbigny, 1834; Cardiapoda acuta Tesch, 1906; Cardiapoda sublaevis Tesch, 1906; Cardiapoda trachydermon Tesch, 1906

Species of gastropod

Cardiapoda placenta, common name the flat cardiapod, is a species of sea snail, a rare pelagic gastropod mollusc in the family Carinariidae.

This species is found worldwide in warm seas between latitudes 40° North and 40° South at depths of up to 650 m.

== Description ==
The maximum recorded shell length is 35 mm.

== Habitat ==
Minimum recorded depth is 0 m. Maximum recorded depth is 203 m.
