= Carinaria galea =

Scientific classification
- Kingdom: Animalia
- Phylum: Mollusca
- Class: Gastropoda
- Subclass: Caenogastropoda
- Order: Littorinimorpha
- Family: Carinariidae
- Genus: Carinaria
- Species: C. galea

Binomial name
- Carinaria galea Benson, 1835

Species of gastropod

Carinaria galea, common name the helmeted carinaria, is a species of sea snail, a marine pelagic marine gastropod mollusc in the family Carinariidae. It was first described in 1835 by William Henry Benson, an amateur malacologist in the Bengal Civil Service.

== Description ==
Benson described the shell of Carinaria galea in detail as "Shell dextral, with the last whorl incurved, compressed, conical, nearly embracing the terminal spire, marked with transverse rugae, broadly keeled. Keel with very oblique rugae, which are curved upwards in the direction of the spire. Aperture transverse, ovate, narrowed towards the keel."

It is a large snail reaching a total body length of 5 cm (2 in). The shell is conical, taller than it is wide, and has a well-developed keel. The body is slender and cylindrical and cannot be retracted into the shell. It has a thin skin with a few large tubercles. The body is transparent and the mouthparts, gut and dark retinas can easily be seen. A pigmented area containing the main body organs is concealed in the shell alongside about six gills. The tail region has a low crest. On the opposite side of the animal to the shell is a large rounded swimming fin with a sucker. The animal swims by undulating the fin from side to side.

== Distribution ==
It is found in the warm waters of the Indo-Pacific Ocean and is a holoplanktonic species that spends it entire life as part of the plankton. It has also been found off New Zealand and the Galapagos Islands.
