= Marginella floccata =

Scientific classification
- Kingdom: Animalia
- Phylum: Mollusca
- Class: Gastropoda
- Subclass: Caenogastropoda
- Order: Neogastropoda
- Family: Marginellidae
- Genus: Marginella
- Species: M. floccata

Binomial name
- Marginella floccata G. B. Sowerby III, 1889

Synonyms
- Marginella intermedia G.B. Sowerby, 1846

Species of gastropod

Marginella floccata (Wooly Marginella) is a species of sea snail, a marine gastropod mollusk in the family Marginellidae, the margin snails.

== Description ==
Shells can be tan, white, or yellow with rows of darker dots, dark mottling, or stripes. Size is 22-30mm for a mature specimen.

== Distribution ==
The species is found in South Africa, mainly along capes and bays.
