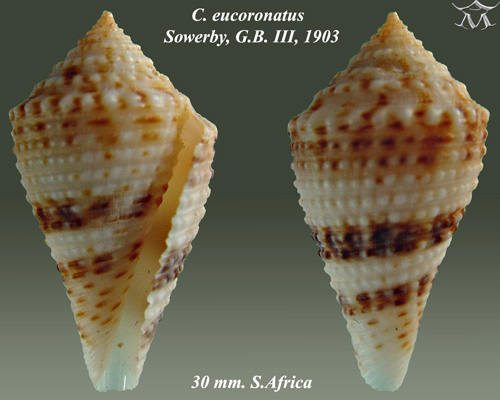
- Apertural and abapertural views of shell of Conasprella eucoronata (Sowerby, G.B. III, 1903)

Scientific classification
- Kingdom: Animalia
- Phylum: Mollusca
- Class: Gastropoda
- Subclass: Caenogastropoda
- Order: Neogastropoda
- Superfamily: Conoidea
- Family: Conidae
- Genus: Conasprella
- Species: C. eucoronata

Binomial name
- Conasprella eucoronata (G. B. Sowerby III, 1903)

Synonyms
- Conasprella albobrunnea Bozzetti, 2017; Conasprella (Conasprella) eucoronata (G. B. Sowerby III, 1903) · accepted, alternate representation; Conus eucoronatus G. B. Sowerby III, 1903 (original combination)

= Conasprella eucoronata =

Species of gastropod

Conasprella eucoronata is a species of sea snail, a marine gastropod mollusk in the family Conidae, the cone snails and their allies.

Like all species within the genus Conasprella, these snails are predatory and venomous. They are capable of stinging humans, therefore live ones should be handled carefully or not at all.

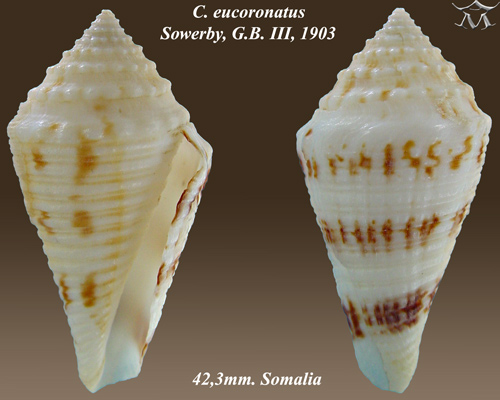
Conasprella eucoronata (Sowerby, G.B. III, 1903)

== Description ==
The size of the shell varies between 24 mm and 50 mm.

== Distribution ==
This marine species occurs off KwaZulu-Natal, Rep. South Africa to Southern Yemen; off Southern India and Sri Lanka.

Countries in which the species can be found include India, Sri Lanka, South Africa, Djibouti, Eritrea, Kenya, Mozambique, Somalia, Tanzania, Yemen, Oman.

== Population trend ==
Currently the population trend of this species is currently stable.

== Gallery ==
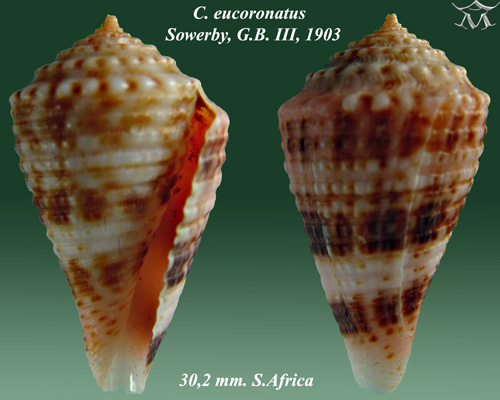
Conasprella eucoronata (Sowerby, G.B. III, 1903)

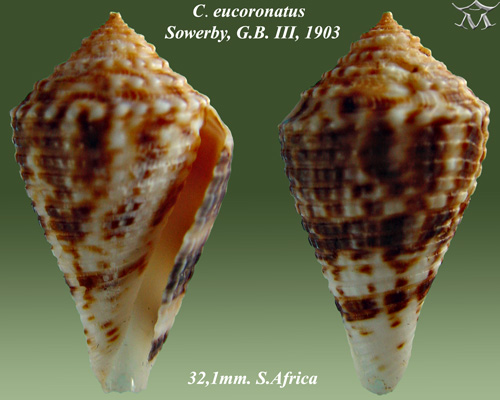
Conasprella eucoronata (Sowerby, G.B. III, 1903)
