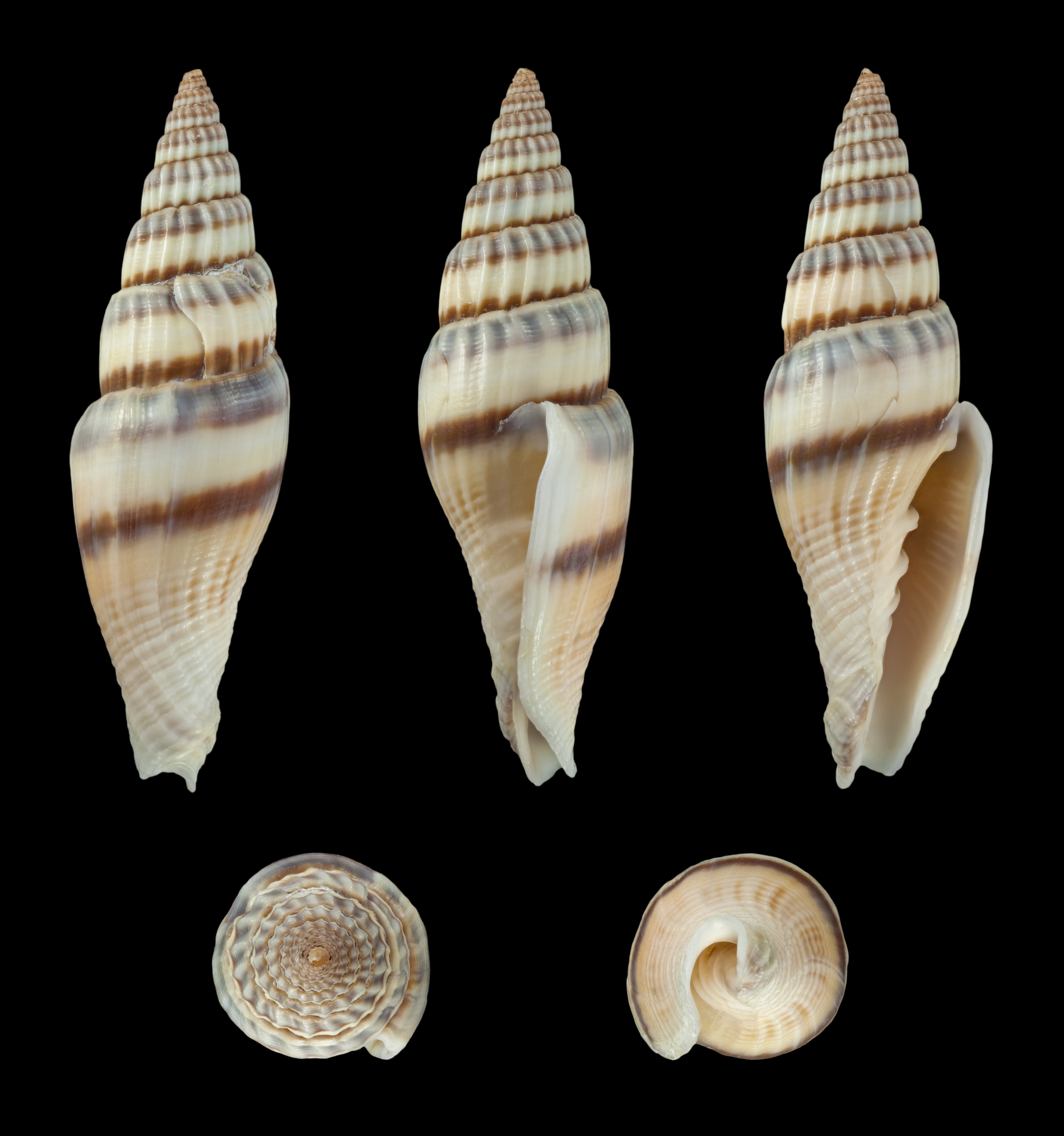

Scientific classification
- Kingdom: Animalia
- Phylum: Mollusca
- Class: Gastropoda
- Subclass: Caenogastropoda
- Order: Neogastropoda
- Superfamily: Turbinelloidea
- Family: Costellariidae
- Genus: Vexillum
- Species: V. curviliratum

Binomial name
- Vexillum curviliratum (Sowerby II & Sowerby III, 1874)

Synonyms
- Mitra adornata Tomlin, 1920; Mitra ornata A. Adams, 1853 (invalid: junior secondary homonym of Voluta ornata Link, 1807; Mitra adornata is a replacement name); Vexillum (Vexillum) curviliratum (G. B. Sowerby II, 1874)

= Vexillum curviliratum =

Species of gastropod

Vexillum curviliratum is a species of small sea snail, marine gastropod mollusk in the family Costellariidae, the ribbed miters.

== Description ==
The length of the shell varies between 37 mm and 54 mm.

== Distribution ==
This marine species occurs off the Philippines, India, Indonesia, Thailand, Vietnam, Taiwan, in the South China Sea; also off Papua New Guinea and Australia (Queensland).
