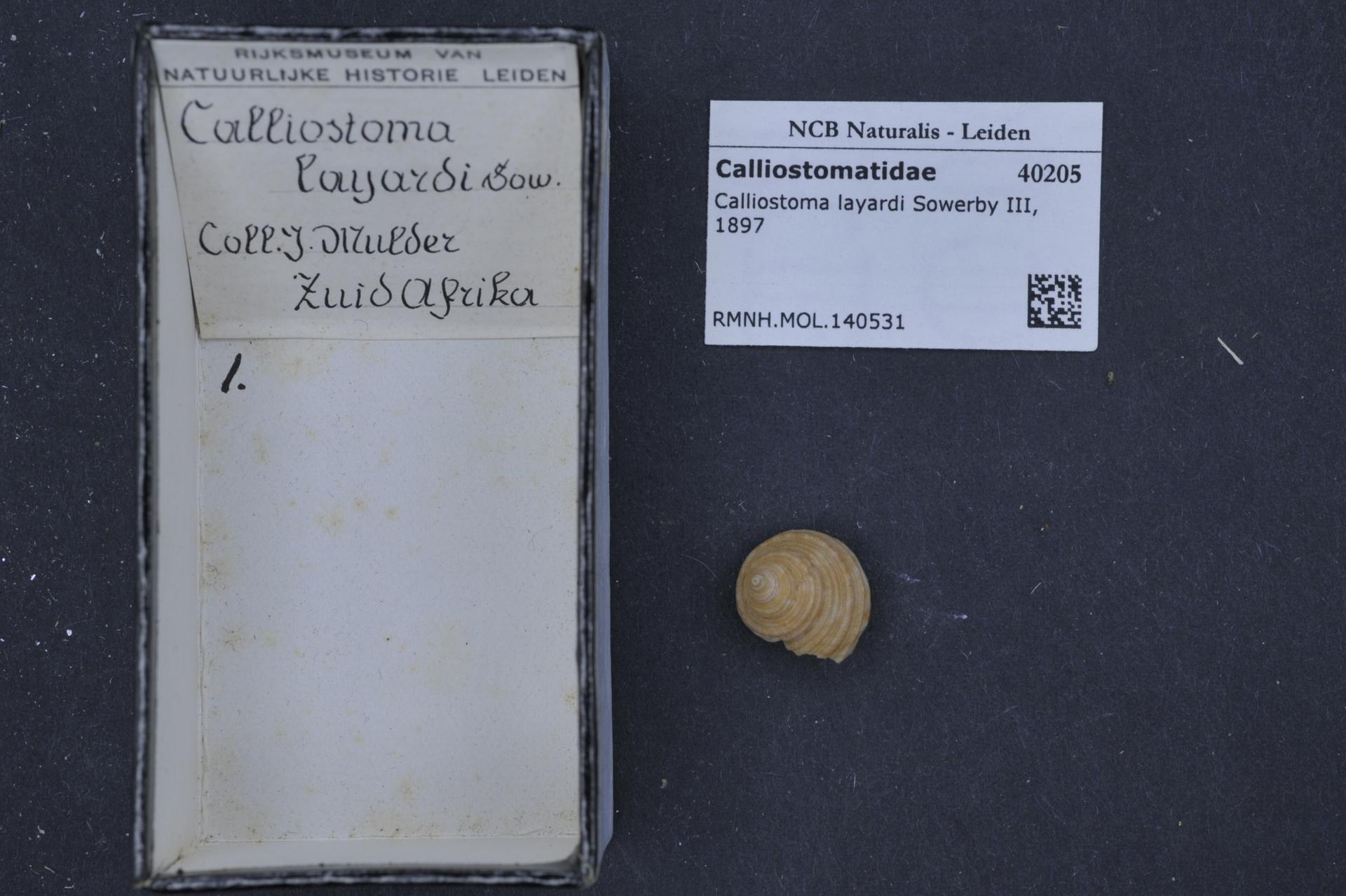

Scientific classification
- Kingdom: Animalia
- Phylum: Mollusca
- Class: Gastropoda
- Subclass: Vetigastropoda
- Order: Trochida
- Family: Calliostomatidae
- Genus: Calliostoma
- Species: C. layardi

Binomial name
- Calliostoma layardi Sowerby III, 1897

= Calliostoma layardi =

Species of gastropod

Calliostoma layardi is a species of sea snail, a marine gastropod mollusk in the family Calliostomatidae.

== Description ==
The size of the shell varies between 12 mm and 25 mm.

The shell is completely serrated and has ridges between the spires, the color is mainly a light reddish brown with light spots.

The shell also has a perfectly pyramidal shape.

== Distribution ==
This species occurs in the Indian Ocean from Southern Transkei to Southern KwaZuluNatal, South Africa.
