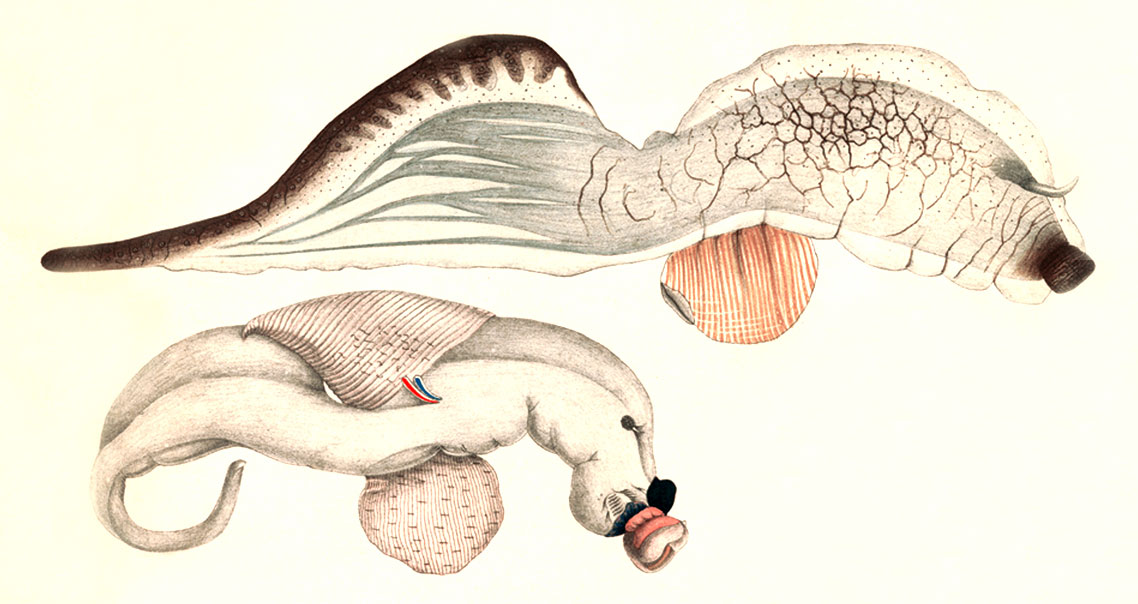
- The shell has been removed in the upper specimen. The tail is to the left.

Scientific classification
- Kingdom: Animalia
- Phylum: Mollusca
- Class: Gastropoda
- Subclass: Caenogastropoda
- Order: Littorinimorpha
- Family: Carinariidae
- Genus: Carinaria
- Species: C. cristata

Binomial name
- Carinaria cristata (Linnaeus, 1767)

Synonyms
- Patella cristata Linnaeus, 1767

= Carinaria cristata =

Glassy nautilus

Species of gastropod

Carinaria cristata, commonly known as the glassy nautilus, is a species of pelagic marine gastropod mollusc in the family Carinariidae. It is found in the Pacific Ocean and is described as being holoplanktonic, because it spends its entire life as part of the plankton. It was first described by Carl Linnaeus in 1767. Its fragile shell was much prized by early conchologists for their collections, being so rare that it was said to be worth more than its weight in gold.

== Description ==
Carinaria cristata is a very large gastropod mollusc that can reach a length of 50 centimetres (20 in). The shell is a ribbed, cap-shaped cone, about as wide as it is long. It is relatively small, and the body is too large to retract inside it. The body consists of a short proboscis, a central portion and a crested tail. The whole is roughly cylindrical and has a swimming fin on the opposite side from the shell, with a small sucker on its edge. The gelatinous body is translucent, and the gut and its contents can be seen through the body wall. The retinas of the eyes are visible as two black spots. The visceral nucleus, which includes the liver, heart, gonad, sexual glands and kidneys, is a dark, stalked, triangular area protected by the shell, which also houses the gills.

== Distribution ==
There are two forms of this species, Carinaria cristata form cristata, and Carinaria cristata form japonica. The former is found in the Indo-Pacific region while the latter is found only in the Pacific. It is uncommon in the Indian Ocean but more plentiful in warm waters off the western coast of North America.

== Ecology ==
Carinaria cristata is carnivorous and is an opportunistic predator. Although its diet is varied, it feeds selectively on salps and doliolids, but also consumes arrow worms and copepods. The copepods are eaten to a much smaller extent than their proportion in the planktonic community would suggest. Other prey includes siphonophores, planktonic worms, fish eggs and larvae, and juveniles and smaller adults of its own species. The food is ingested whole and retained in the oesophagus where it is digested by enzymes secreted by the salivary glands.

C. cristata is eaten by a number of predators including turtles and tuna.
