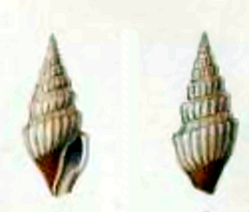
- Original image of a shell of Clavus infrafusca

Scientific classification
- Kingdom: Animalia
- Phylum: Mollusca
- Class: Gastropoda
- Subclass: Caenogastropoda
- Order: Neogastropoda
- Superfamily: Conoidea
- Family: Drilliidae
- Genus: Clavus
- Species: C. infrafusca

Binomial name
- Clavus infrafusca (Sowerby G.B. III, 1893)

Synonyms
- Drillia infrafusca (Sowerby III, 1893); Pleurotoma infrafusca Sowerby III, 1893 (original combination)

= Clavus infrafusca =

Species of gastropod

Clavus infrafusca is a species of sea snail, a marine gastropod mollusk in the family Drilliidae.

== Description ==
The shell grows to a length of 19 mm, its diameter 7 mm. The ground color of the shell is white. The interstices between the ribs are red, while the lowest part of the body whorl is dark red. The very acute, turriform shell contains 10 whorls. The first 2-3 are not shouldered, the others are shouldered, concave above the angle, below hardly convex. The shell shows many opisthocline ribs of which the higher parts are thickened. They show minute red dots at the angle. The body whorl is very large compared to the length of the shell. The aperture has an oval shape. The outer lip is sharp and slightly sinuated. The siphonal canal is very short.

== Distribution ==
This species is found in the Indian Ocean in the Mascarene Basin off Mauritius and Réunion
