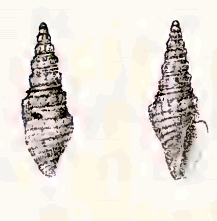
- Original image of a shell of Splendrillia bednalli

Scientific classification
- Kingdom: Animalia
- Phylum: Mollusca
- Class: Gastropoda
- Subclass: Caenogastropoda
- Order: Neogastropoda
- Superfamily: Conoidea
- Family: Drilliidae
- Genus: Splendrillia
- Species: S. bednalli

Binomial name
- Splendrillia bednalli (G.B. Sowerby III, 1896)

Synonyms
- Drillia bednalli Sowerby III, 1896; Melatoma bednalli (Sowerby III, 1897)

= Splendrillia bednalli =

Species of gastropod

Splendrillia bednalli is a species of sea snail, a marine gastropod mollusk in the family Drilliidae.

== Description ==
The length of the shell attains 16 mm, its diameter 5 mm. The white shell has an elongate-turreted shape with an acuminate spire. The shell contains 9½ convex, obtusely angulated whorls. A very characteristic species, marked with brown transverse lines, about six on the body whorl. The specimens vary somewhat. The holotype is pretty distinctly longitudinally ribbed, and the ribs are raised to form a crown at the angle. In other individuals the ribs are obsolete, only the nodules at the angle remaining. The oblong aperture has a moderate width. The columella is slightly contorted.

== Distribution ==
This marine species is endemic to Australia and occurs off South Australia
