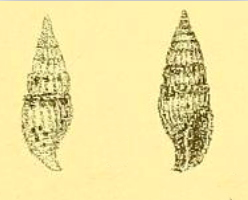
- Shell of Vexillum smithi (holotype)

Scientific classification
- Kingdom: Animalia
- Phylum: Mollusca
- Class: Gastropoda
- Subclass: Caenogastropoda
- Order: Neogastropoda
- Superfamily: Turbinelloidea
- Family: Costellariidae
- Genus: Vexillum
- Species: V. smithi

Binomial name
- Vexillum smithi (Sowerby III, 1889)

Synonyms
- Mitra smithi G. B. Sowerby III, 1889 (original combination); Vexillum (Pusia) smithi (G. B. Sowerby III, 1889) · unaccepted; Vexillum catenatum smithi (G. B. Sowerby III, 1889)

= Vexillum smithi =

Species of gastropod

Vexillum smithi is a species of small sea snail, marine gastropod mollusk in the family Costellariidae, the ribbed miters.

== Description ==
The length of the shell attains 16 mm, its diameter 5 mm.

(original description) The shell has an elongate-fusiform shape. It is whitish, sparsely banded and spotted with yellow and brown. The spire is very acute and pointed. It contains 11 convex whorls covered with axial ribs. The ribs are very numerous, narrow, crowded, rounded, smooth and near the suture tuberculate. The insterstices are hardly striated. The body whorl has about the same length as the spire. Above and below the band the shell is painted pale yellow with brown spots, the middle zone is white. Below the shell is attenuated, spirally grooved and granular, ending in a recurved tail. The columella is slightly sinuous, three-plaited with thick folds. The aperture is long and narrow.

== Distribution ==
This marine species occurs off Mozambique and Réunion.
