= Gibberula burnupi =

Scientific classification
- Kingdom: Animalia
- Phylum: Mollusca
- Class: Gastropoda
- Subclass: Caenogastropoda
- Order: Neogastropoda
- Family: Cystiscidae
- Subfamily: Cystiscinae
- Genus: Gibberula
- Species: G. burnupi

Binomial name
- Gibberula burnupi (Sowerby III, 1897)

Synonyms
- Granula burnupi (Sowerby III, 1897); Marginella burnupi Sowerby III, 1897; Marginella lepta Bartsch, 1915

Species of gastropod

Gibberula burnupi is a species of sea snail, a marine gastropod mollusk in the family Cystiscidae, the margin snails.

== Description ==
The length of the shell varies between 4 mm and 5.2 mm.

== Distribution ==
This species is distributed in the Indian Ocean along Madagascar and South Africa.
