= Cardiapoda =

Scientific classification
- Kingdom: Animalia
- Phylum: Mollusca
- Class: Gastropoda
- Subclass: Caenogastropoda
- Order: Littorinimorpha
- Family: Carinariidae
- Genus: Cardiapoda; D'Orbigny, 1835

Species
- See text

Genus of gastropods

Cardiapoda is a genus of very small floating sea snails or heteropods, pelagic gastropod molluscs or micromolluscs in the family Carinariidae.

Both tentacles are of equal size and well-developed. The external layer of the body wall is thin.

They are found worldwide in the pelagic zone of warm seas.

== Species ==
- Cardiapoda placenta (Lesson, 1831) - flat cardiapod
- Cardiapoda richardi Vayssière, 1903

=== Synonyms ===
- Cardiapoda acuta Tesch, 1906 (synonym of Cardiapoda placenta (Lesson, 1831) )
- Cardiapoda carinata D'Orbigny, 1834 (synonym of Cardiapoda richardi Vayssière, 1903)
- Cardiapoda pedunculata D'Orbigny, 1835 (synonym of Cardiapoda placenta (Lesson, 1831) )
- Cardiapoda sublaevis Tesch, 1906 (synonym of Cardiapoda placenta (Lesson, 1831) )
