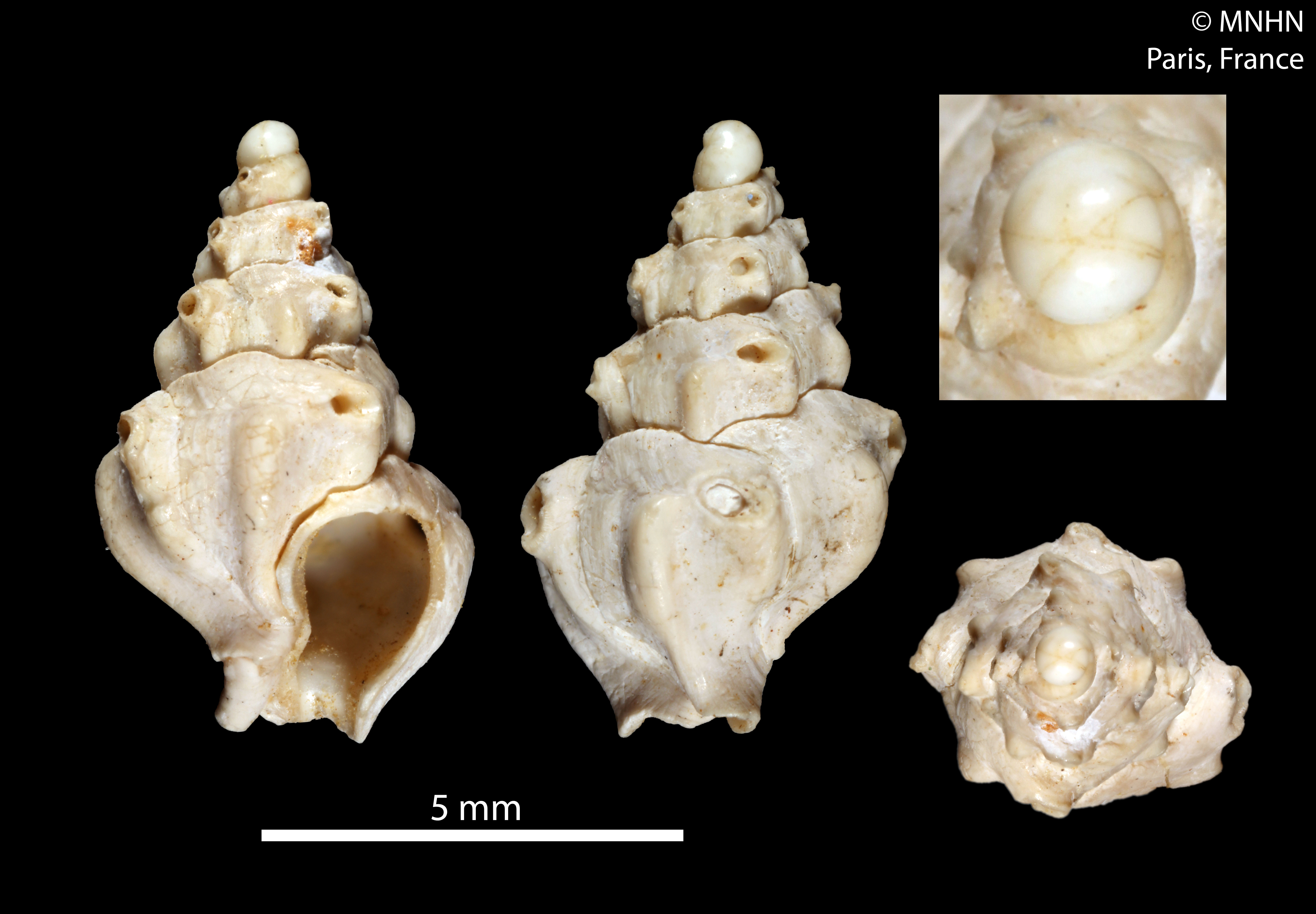
- Shell of Chicomurex rosadoi (paratype at MNHN, Paris)

Scientific classification
- Kingdom: Animalia
- Phylum: Mollusca
- Class: Gastropoda
- Subclass: Caenogastropoda
- Order: Neogastropoda
- Family: Muricidae
- Genus: Chicomurex
- Species: C. rosadoi

Binomial name
- Chicomurex rosadoi Houart, 1999

= Chicomurex rosadoi =

Species of gastropod

Chicomurex rosadoi is a species of sea snail, a marine gastropod mollusk in the family Muricidae, the murex snails or rock snails.

== Description ==
The yellowish-brown shell reaches a length of 49 mm. The heavy and squamous spire is biconical in shape. The protoconch contains 1.5 whorls. The teleoconch contains 6.5 broad and convex whorls that are weakly shouldered and contain adpressed sutures.

The body whorl is axially sculptured with 12 nodose and rounded ribs, the second whorl 15, the third whorl 16. The other whorls contain three rounded, webbed varices with short, open spines and high ribs between the varices.

The body whorl is spirally sculptured with five rather high, rounded cords, the second and third whorl with six or seven, the fourth with six to eight cords and one shallow thread between each pair of cords, the fifth whorl with 17–19 cords and threads and the last teleoconch whorl with nine or ten cords and shallow threads.

The large, round to ovate, white aperture can be closed by a brown round to ovate operculum. The narrow and smooth inner lip shows at its posterior end a shallow and broad anal sinus. The erect outer lip is denticulate and with a weak sculpture of 9 or 10 lirae. The short and broad siphonal canal is weakly bent at the tip and contains two webbed spines.

== Distribution ==
This species occurs in the Indian Ocean off Mozambique.
