= Chicomurex protoglobosus =

Scientific classification
- Kingdom: Animalia
- Phylum: Mollusca
- Class: Gastropoda
- Subclass: Caenogastropoda
- Order: Neogastropoda
- Family: Muricidae
- Genus: Chicomurex
- Species: C. protoglobosus

Binomial name
- Chicomurex protoglobosus Houart, 1992

Species of gastropod

Chicomurex protoglobosus is a species of sea snail, a marine gastropod mollusk in the family Muricidae, the murex snails or rock snails.

== Distribution ==
This marine species occurs off New Caledonia.
