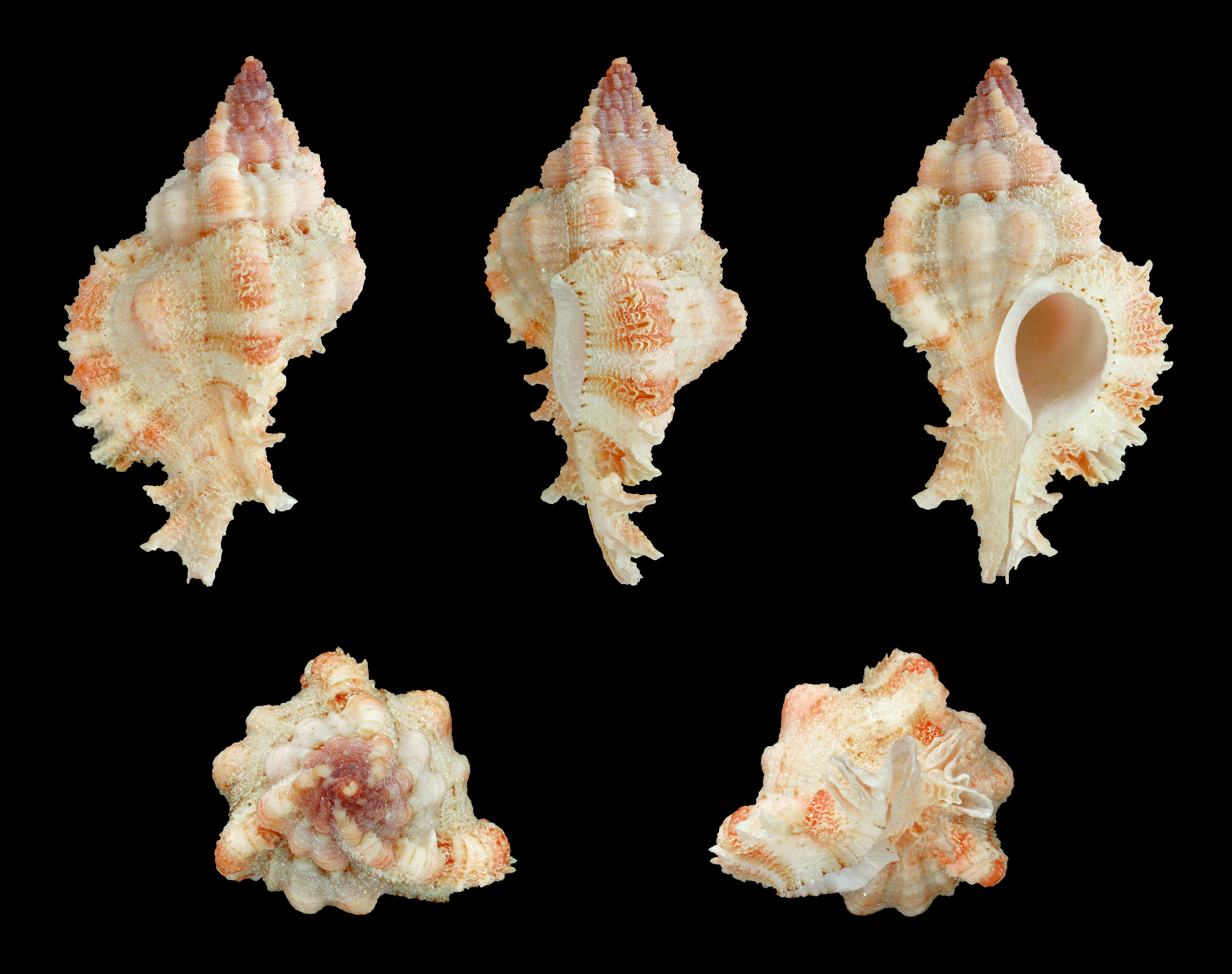

Scientific classification
- Kingdom: Animalia
- Phylum: Mollusca
- Class: Gastropoda
- Subclass: Caenogastropoda
- Order: Neogastropoda
- Family: Muricidae
- Genus: Chicomurex
- Species: C. venustulus

Binomial name
- Chicomurex venustulus (Rehder & Wilson, 1975)

Synonyms
- Chicoreus (Chicomurex) venustulus Rehder & Wilson, 1975; Chicoreus gloriosus Shikama, 1977

= Chicomurex venustulus =

Species of gastropod

Chicomurex venustulus, common name the charming murex, is a species of sea snail, a marine gastropod mollusk in the family Muricidae, the murex snails or rock snails.

== Description ==
The size of an adult shell varies between 40 mm and 72 mm.

== Distribution ==
This species occurs in the Indian Ocean along Réunion, in the Pacific Ocean along the Marquesas Islands and the Philippines, and in the South China Sea along Vietnam.
