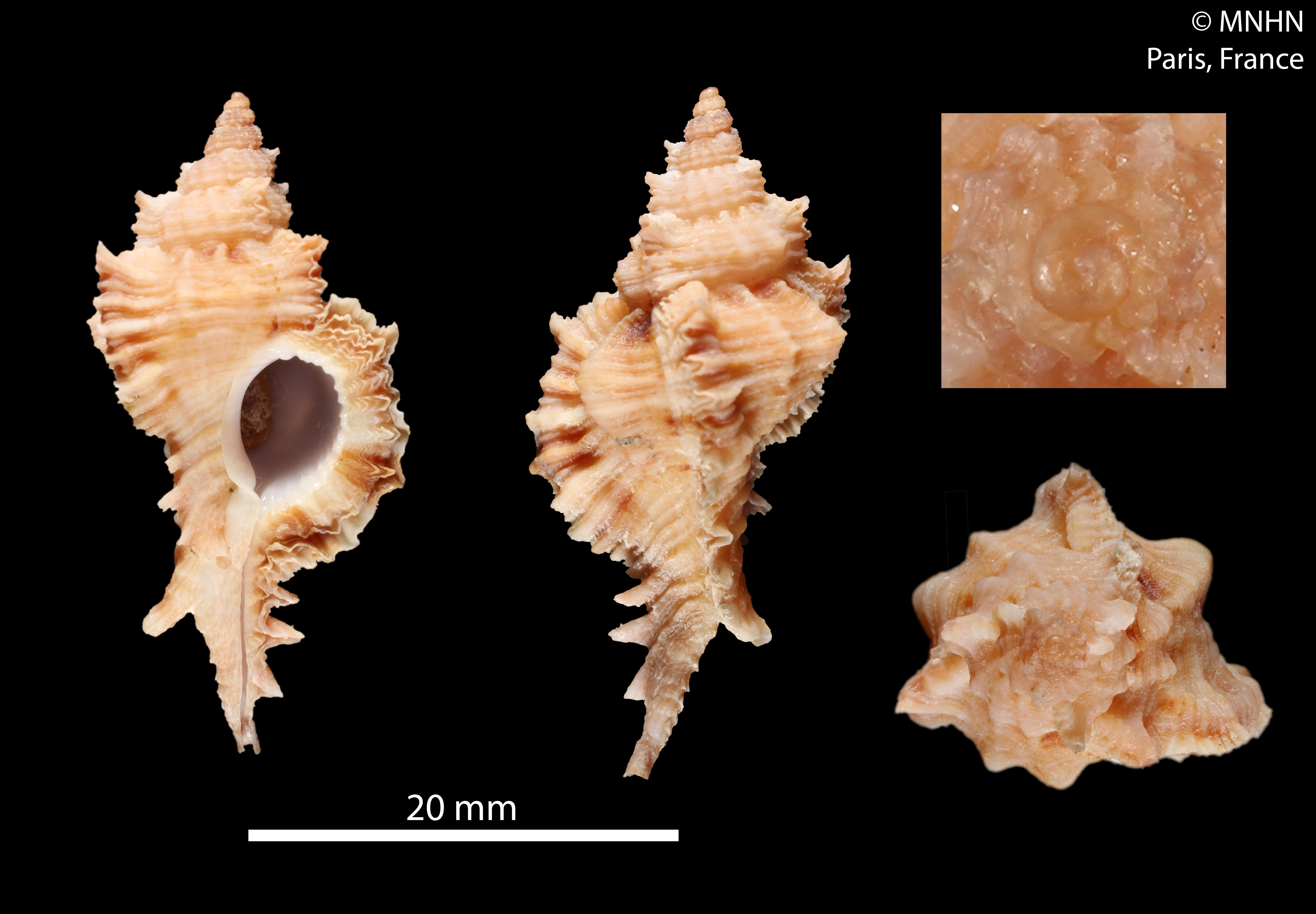
- Shell of Chicomurex turschi (paratype at MNHN, Paris)

Scientific classification
- Kingdom: Animalia
- Phylum: Mollusca
- Class: Gastropoda
- Subclass: Caenogastropoda
- Order: Neogastropoda
- Family: Muricidae
- Genus: Chicomurex
- Species: C. turschi

Binomial name
- Chicomurex turschi (Houart, 1981)

Synonyms
- Chicoreus (Chicomurex) turschi Houart, 1981

= Chicomurex turschi =

Species of gastropod

Chicomurex turschi is a species of sea snail, a marine gastropod mollusk in the family Muricidae, the murex snails or 'rock snails'.

== Distribution ==
This marine species occurs off Indonesia and Papua New Guinea
