= Pterosoma planum =

Scientific classification
- Domain: Eukaryota
- Kingdom: Animalia
- Phylum: Mollusca
- Class: Gastropoda
- Subclass: Caenogastropoda
- Order: Littorinimorpha
- Superfamily: Pterotracheoidea
- Family: Carinariidae
- Genus: Pterosoma
- Species: P. planum

Binomial name
- Pterosoma planum R. P. Lesson, 1827

Synonyms
- Aloysia phyllosoma Issel, 1907; Carinaria depressa E. A. Smith, 1888; Pterosoma challengeri Tesch, 1906; Pterosoma plana Lesson, 1827 (wrong grammatical agreement of epithet)

Species of gastropod

Pterosoma planum is a species of marine gastropod in the family Carinariidae.
