= Chicomurex elliscrossi =

Scientific classification
- Kingdom: Animalia
- Phylum: Mollusca
- Class: Gastropoda
- Subclass: Caenogastropoda
- Order: Neogastropoda
- Family: Muricidae
- Genus: Chicomurex
- Species: C. elliscrossi

Binomial name
- Chicomurex elliscrossi (Fair, 1974)

Synonyms
- Chicoreus elliscrossi Fair, 1974

Species of gastropod

Chicomurex elliscrossi is a species of sea snail, a marine gastropod mollusk in the family Muricidae, the murex snails or rock snails.
