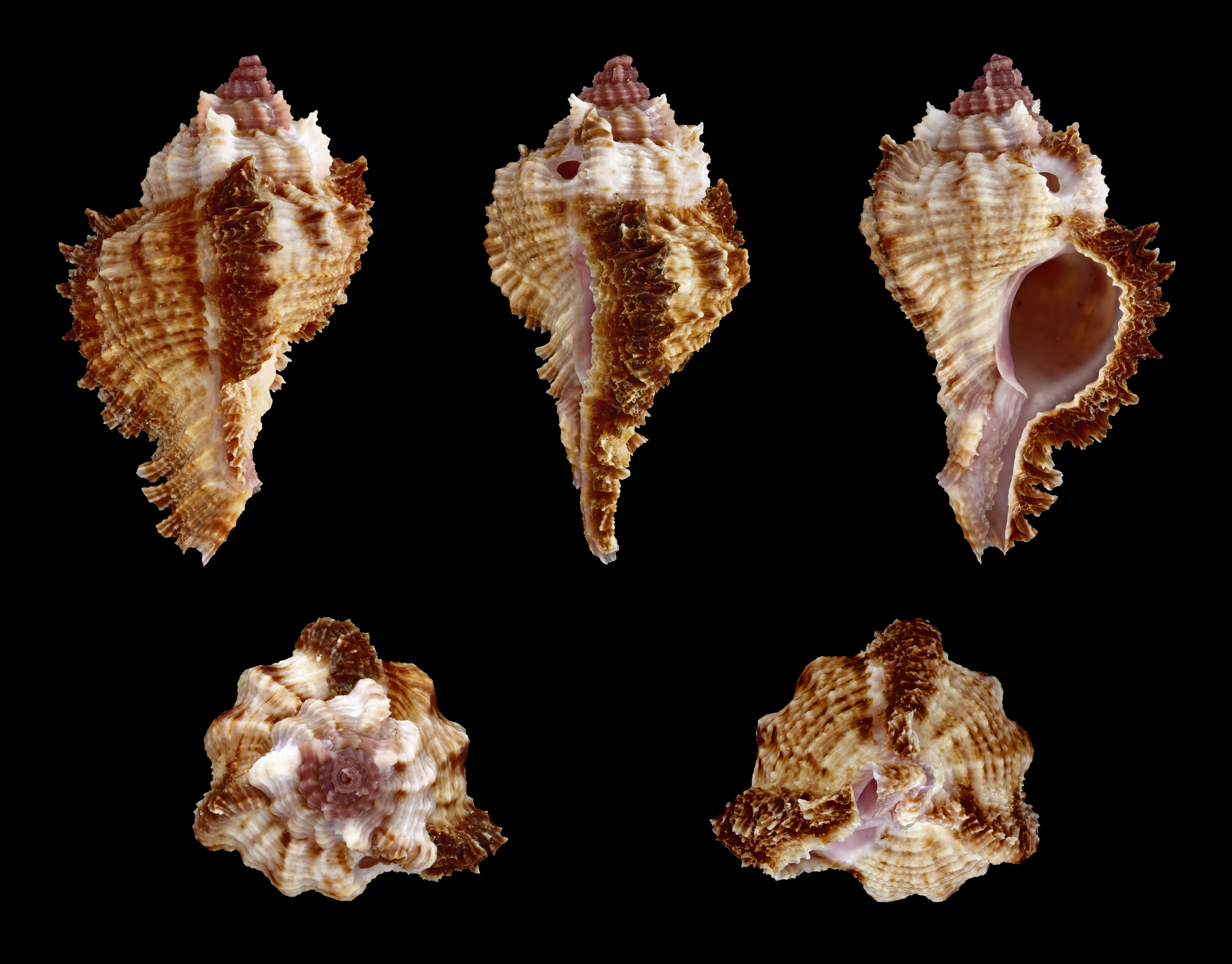

Scientific classification
- Kingdom: Animalia
- Phylum: Mollusca
- Class: Gastropoda
- Subclass: Caenogastropoda
- Order: Neogastropoda
- Family: Muricidae
- Genus: Chicomurex
- Species: C. laciniatus

Binomial name
- Chicomurex laciniatus (Sowerby, 1841)

Synonyms
- Chicoreus filialis Shikama, 1971; Murex laciniatus Sowerby, 1841; Murex scabrosus Sowerby, 1841

= Chicomurex laciniatus =

Species of gastropod

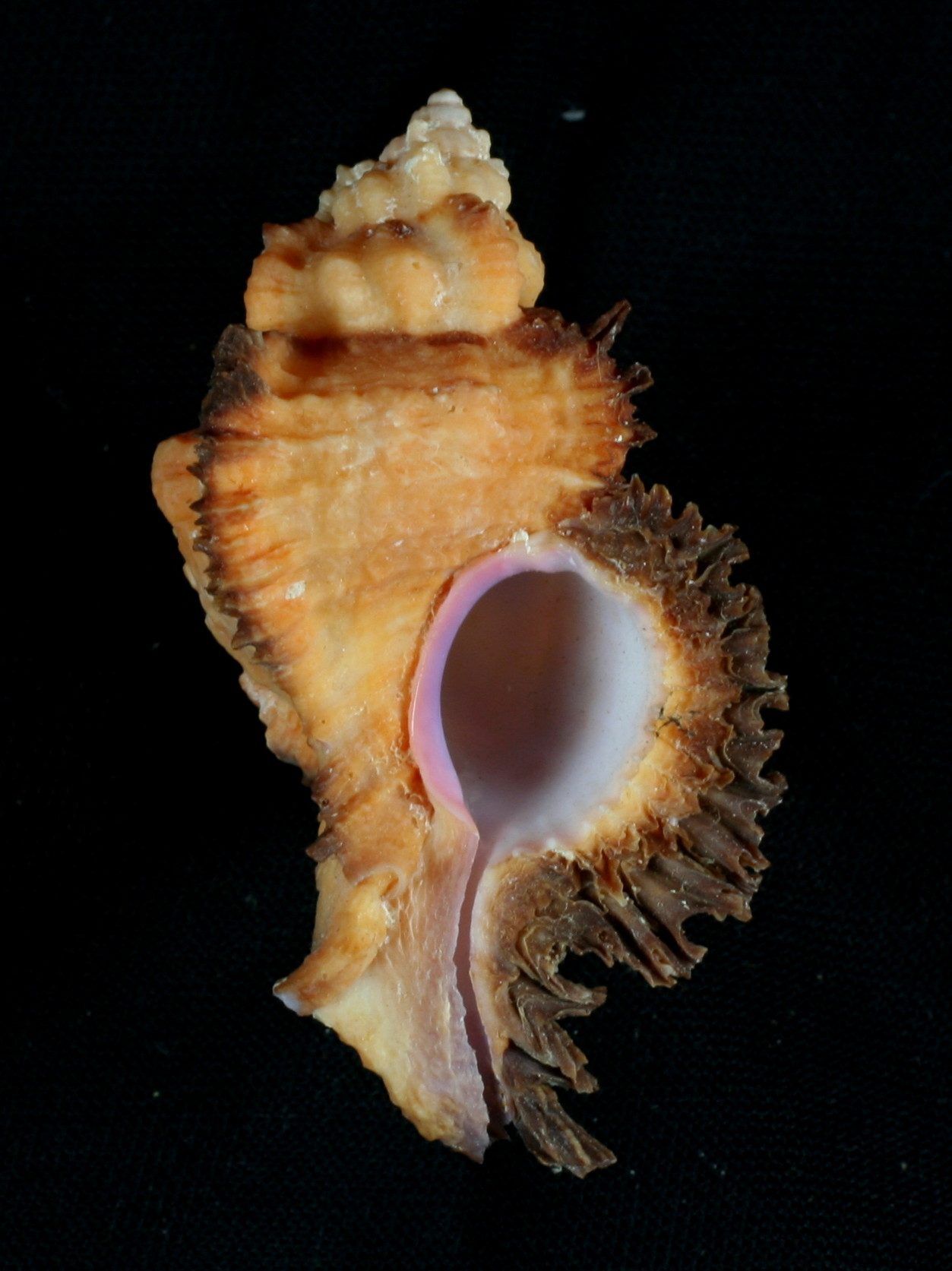
Shell of Chicomurex laciniatus (Sowerby, 1841), measuring 69.5 mm in height, from Cebu in the Philippines.

Chicomurex laciniatus, common name the laciniated murex, is a species of sea snail, a marine gastropod mollusk in the family Muricidae, the murex snails or rock snails.

== Description ==
The size of an adult shell varies between 30 mm and 77 mm.

== Distribution ==
This marine species is found off the Philippines and Northern Queensland, Australia.
