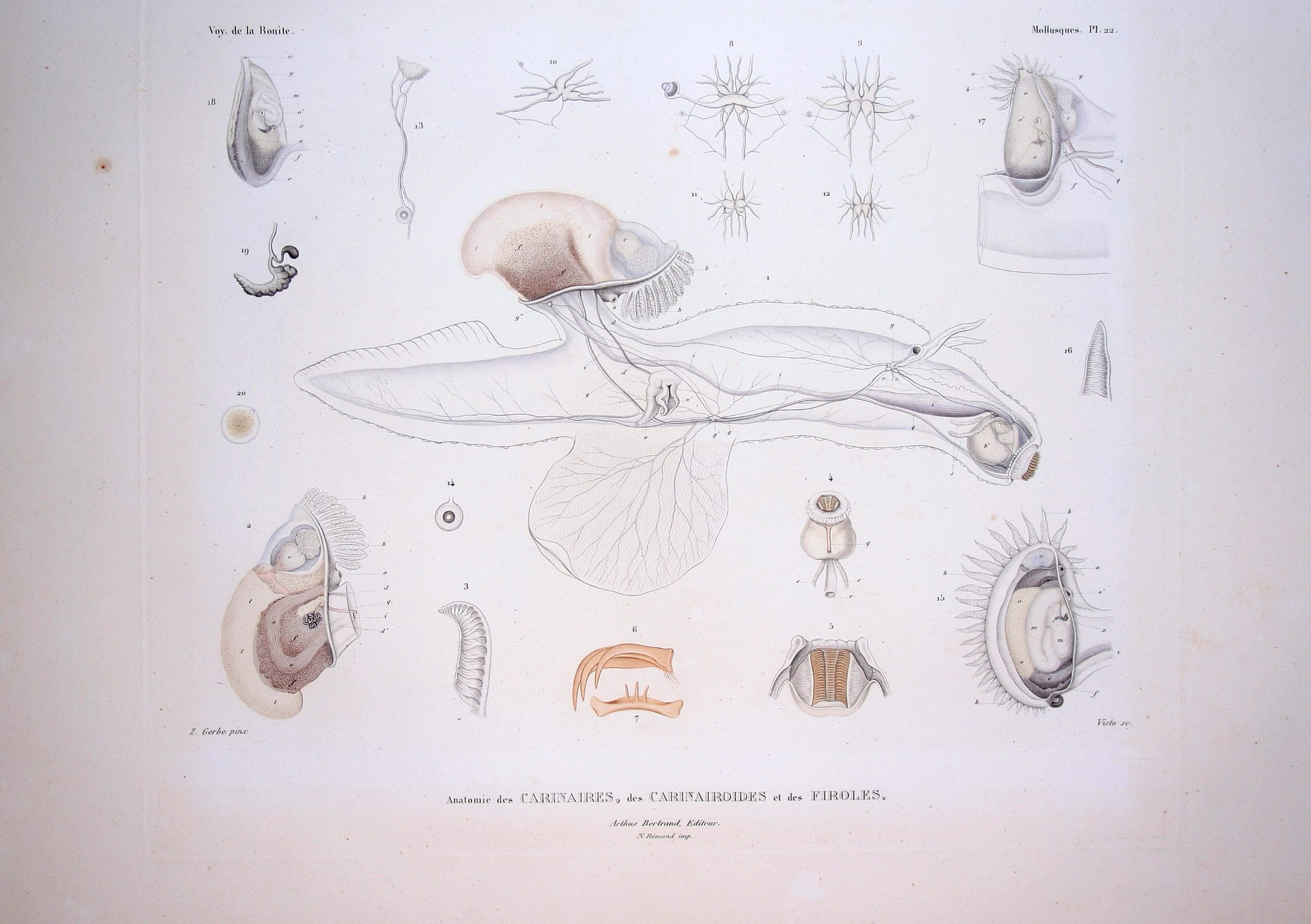
- Carinaria anatomy

Scientific classification
- Kingdom: Animalia
- Phylum: Mollusca
- Class: Gastropoda
- Subclass: Caenogastropoda
- Order: Littorinimorpha
- Family: Carinariidae
- Genus: Carinaria; Lamarck, 1801

Species
- See text

= Carinaria =

Genus of gastropods

Carinaria is a genus of medium-sized floating sea snails, pelagic gastropod molluscs in the family Carinariidae.

== Anatomy ==
The cylindrical and elongate body consists of three parts : a short proboscis, a well-developed trunk and tail region of variable size. The size of this tail goes from very small in Carinaria galea to very large in Carinaria cristata. The well-developed swimming fin is located in both sexes at the back of the trunk and has at its back margin a small fin sucker. The right tentacle is small or vestigial. The cuticle is thick and gelatinous. The shells are known as “Venus slippers.”

== Species ==
The World Register of Marine Species includes the following species within the genus Carinaria:

- † Carinaria andreae Stancu, 1978
- Carinaria cithara Benson, 1835 – harp carinaria
- Carinaria cristata (Linnaeus, 1767) – Indo-Pacific
- Carinaria galea Benson, 1835 – helmet carinaria; Indo-Pacific
- † Carinaria hugardi F.-J. Pictet, 1855
- Carinaria japonica Okutani, 1955 – Japan, North Pacific
- Carinaria lamarckii Blainville, 1817
- † Carinaria maempeli A. W. Janssen, 2012
- Carinaria pseudorugosa Vayssière, 1904
- Carinaria splendida Poppe & Tagaro, 2026
- † Carinaria striata (Di Geronimo, 1974)
- † Carinaria tournoueri Peyrot, 1932

Species brought into synonymy:

- Carinaria atlantica Adams & Reeve, 1850: synonym of Carinaria lamarckii Blainville, 1817
- Carinaria australis Quoy & Gaimard, 1833: synonym of Carinaria lamarckii Blainville, 1817
- Carinaria challengeri Bonnevie, 1920: synonym of Carinaria pseudorugosa Vayssière, 1904
- Carinaria grimaldii Vayssière, 1904: synonym of Carinaria lamarckii Blainville, 1817
- Carinaria lamarcki Péron & Lesueur, 1810: synonym of Carinaria lamarckii Blainville, 1817
- Carinaria mediterranea Blainville, 1825: synonym of Carinaria lamarckii Blainville, 1817
- Carinaria punctata d'Orbigny, 1836: synonym of Carinaria lamarckii Blainville, 1817
