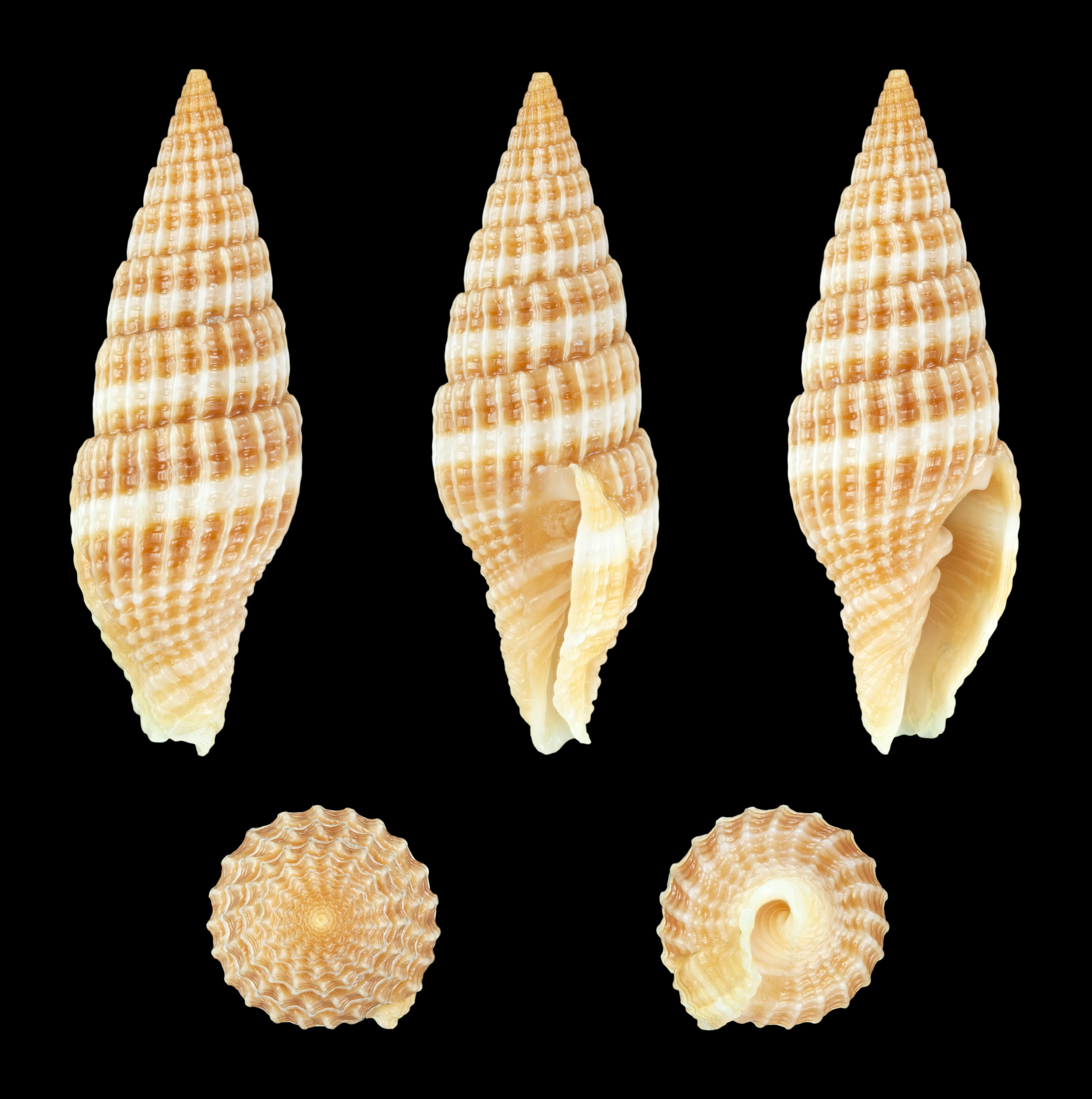
- Vexillum obeliscus

Scientific classification
- Kingdom: Animalia
- Phylum: Mollusca
- Class: Gastropoda
- Subclass: Caenogastropoda
- Order: Neogastropoda
- Superfamily: Turbinelloidea
- Family: Costellariidae
- Genus: Vexillum
- Species: V. obeliscus

Binomial name
- Vexillum obeliscus (Reeve, 1844)

Synonyms
- Costellaria obeliscus (Reeve, 1844); Mitra (Turricula) obeliscus Reeve, 1844; Mitra (Turricula) obeliscus var. andamanica G. Nevill & H. Nevill, 1875; Mitra obeliscus Reeve, 1844; Mitropifex quasillus Iredale, 1929 ·; Turricula (Costellaria) obeliscus (Reeve, 1844); Vexillum andamanica Nevill, G. & H. Nevill, 1875; Turricula quasillus Iredale, T., 1929

= Vexillum obeliscus =

Species of gastropod

Vexillum obeliscus, common name the obelisk mitre, is a species of small sea snail, marine gastropod mollusk in the family Costellariidae, the ribbed miters.

== Description ==
The shell size varies between 20 mm and 45 mm.

(Original description) The shell is acuminately turreted. The spire is sharp. The whorls are longitudinally ribbed. The ribs are narrow and close-set. The interstices are impressly cancellated. The shell is yellowish brown, encircled with a single white line. The columella is four-plaited. The base is recurved in a twisted manner.

The shell is chestnut-brown, with a central white band, and sometimes an inferior narrower one.

The shells are extremely variable in sculpture and other morphological features.

== Distribution ==
This species is distributed in the Red Sea and in the Indian Ocean along the Mascarene Basin and Madagascar; in the Pacific Ocean along New Guinea, New Caledonia, Fiji and the Solomons Islands.
