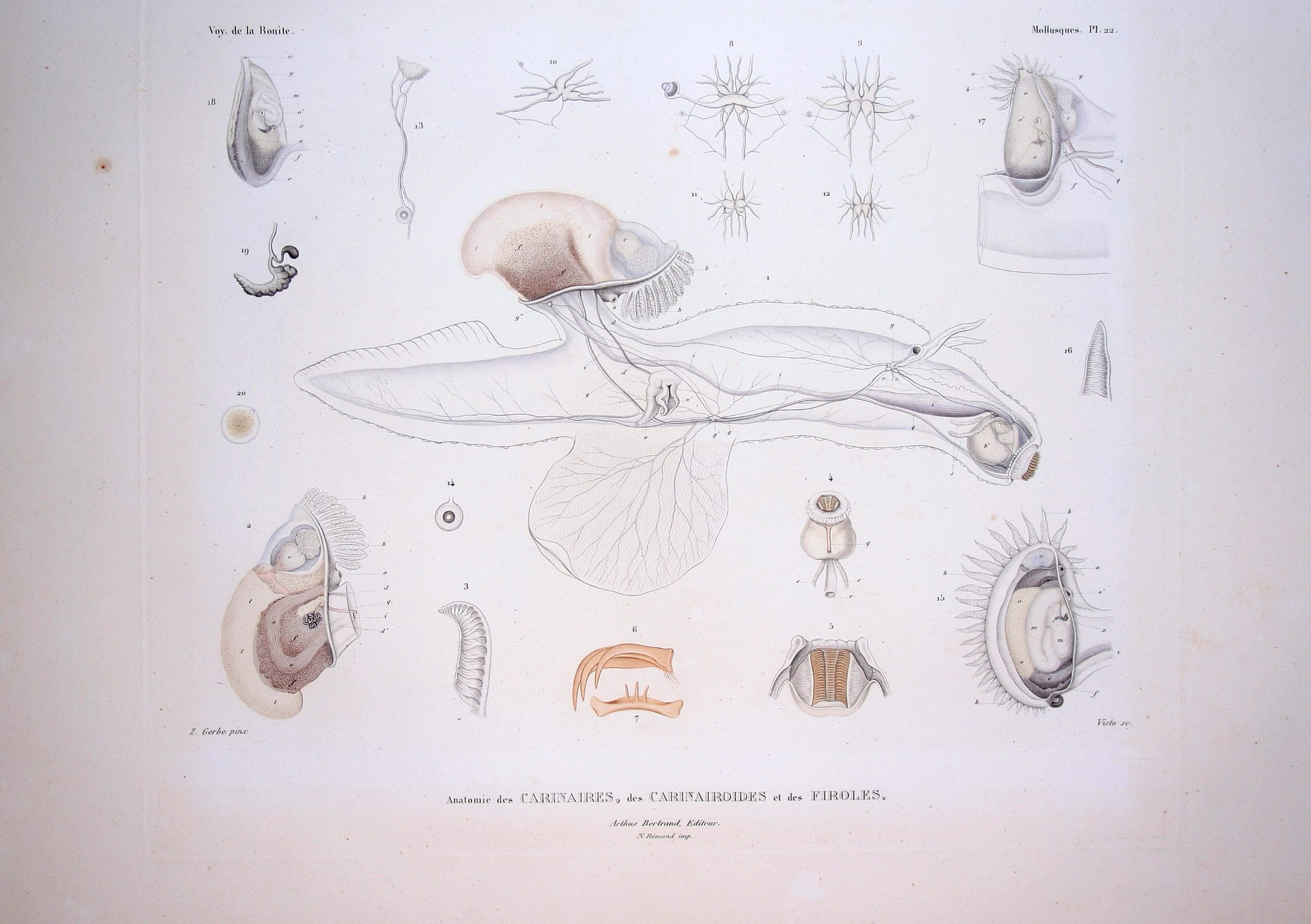
- Some examples of Carinariidae from "Atlas Zoologique du Voyage de la corvette La Bonite (1845–1852)"

Scientific classification
- Kingdom: Animalia
- Phylum: Mollusca
- Class: Gastropoda
- Subclass: Caenogastropoda
- Order: Littorinimorpha
- Superfamily: Pterotracheoidea
- Family: Carinariidae; Blainville, 1818

Genera
- See text

= Carinariidae =

Family of gastropods

Carinariidae, known by the common name "heteropods" like their relatives in the Pterotracheoidea, is a taxonomic family of swimming or floating sea snails, pelagic marine gastropod molluscs in the clade Littorinimorpha.

== Distribution ==
The snails of this family occur worldwide in the pelagic zone of tropical to subtropical seas. floating or swimming by moving up and down the fin-shaped front part of their foot.

== Feeding habits ==
They feed on jellyfish, larvae of other snails and on zooplankton.

== Anatomy ==
The cylindrical body of these snails can be divided in three regions: the proboscis, the trunk and the tail region. The body is elongated and much longer than the reduced shell. But in Pterosoma the trunk is wider and is somewhat disc-shaped. The taenioglossan radula has seven teeth in each row: one central tooth, flanked on each side by one lateral and two marginal teeth. The central tooth has three central cusps and on each side a large process backing away from the center. The lateral teeth terminate in a sharp point.

The protoconch in the adult shell of Carinaria and Pterosoma is located at the apex.

== Taxonomy ==
The following two subfamilies have been recognized in the taxonomy of Bouchet & Rocroi (2005):

- Carinariinae Blainville, 1818 – synonym: Pterosomatidae, Rang, 1829
- † Brunoniinae Dieni, 1990

== Genera ==
Genera within the family Carinariidae include:

Carinariinae

- Cardiapoda D'Orbigny, 1835
- Carinaria Lamarck, 1801
- Pterosoma Lesson, 1827 – the only one species: Pterosoma planum R. P. Lesson, 1827

† Brunoniinae

- † Brunonia G. Müller, 1898 – type genus of the subfamily Brunoniinae
