= George Brettingham Sowerby III =

British conchologist, publisher, and illustrator

George Brettingham Sowerby III (London, 16 September 1843 – 31 January 1921) was a British conchologist, publisher, and illustrator.

He was the eldest son of G. B. Sowerby II. At the age of seventeen or eighteen, he began his career as a conchologist, operating from his father's residence. From October 1897, the business was conducted under the name Sowerby and Fulton. Mr. Sowerby retired in January 1916.

He married Miss Rose Wilkie in June 1867, and they had three children: one son and two daughters.

He, too, worked (like his father George Brettingham Sowerby II and his grandfather George Brettingham Sowerby I) on the Thesaurus Conchyliorium, a comprehensive, beautifully illustrated work on molluscs. He was colour blind, and thus his daughter did most of the colouring of his engravings.

He was a prolific contributor to the scientific literature. He authored numerous papers for various societies and was responsible for the description of around 720 new species of mollusca. His inaugural paper was published in the Proceedings of the Zoological Society of London in May 1873, and his final contribution appeared in the Proceedings of the Malacological Society of London in June 1921.

His most notable works included:

- A revised edition of his father's seminal work, "'Illustrated Index of British Shells,'" published in 1887.
- The completion of the Monograph on Turbo (Part 43 and the entirety of Part 44), and the completion of the Conus and Voluta, the monographs within Volume V of the comprehensive "Thesaurus Conchyliorum", a comprehensive, beautifully illustrated work on molluscs. He was colour blind, and thus his daughter did most of the colouring of his engravings.
- The publication of "'Marine Shells of South Africa'" in 1892, supplemented by an appendix released in 1897.
- The "'Monograph of Carinaria,'" which appeared in the Proceedings of the Malacological Society of London in 1893.

A series of "'Notes on the Ampullaridae,'" published in the Proceedings of the Malacological Society of London, Volume VIII, p. 305; Volume IX, p. 56; and Volume XII, p. 65."

== See also ==
- Sowerby family
