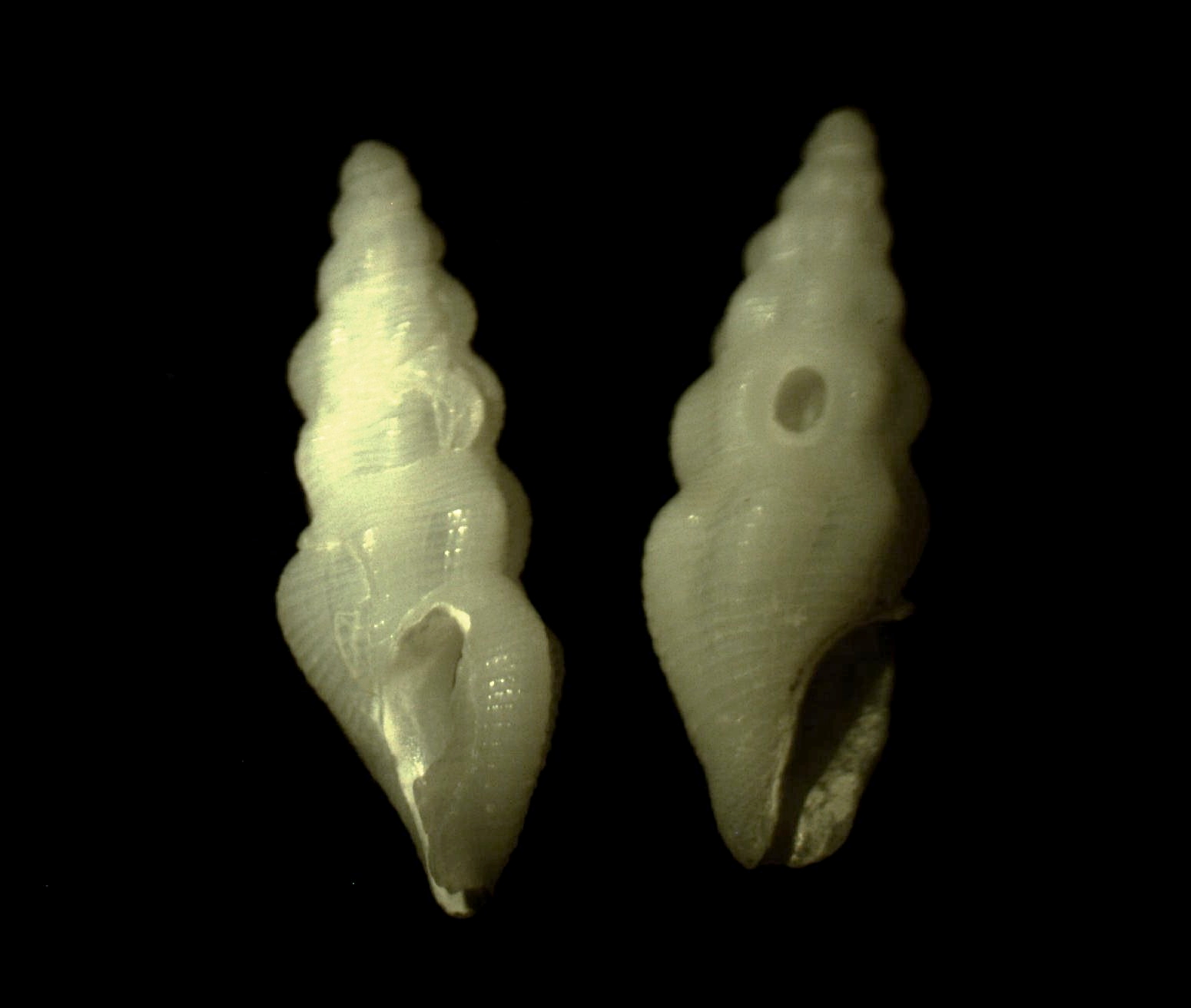
- Shell of Kurtziella perryae

Scientific classification
- Kingdom: Animalia
- Phylum: Mollusca
- Class: Gastropoda
- Subclass: Caenogastropoda
- Order: Neogastropoda
- Superfamily: Conoidea
- Family: Mangeliidae
- Genus: Kurtziella; Dall, 1918

Type species
- Pleurotoma cerinum Kurtz & Stimpson, 1851

Species
- See text

Synonyms
- Kurtziella (Kurtziella) Dall, 1918 superseded rank; Lyropleura Locard, 1897 ·(unavailable name, introduced in synonymy and never used as valid); Macteola (Kurtziella) Dall, 1918 superseded rank; Mangelia (Kurtziella) Dall, 1918; Mangilia (Kurtziella) Dall, 1918

= Kurtziella =

Genus of molluscs

Kurtziella is a genus of small, predatory sea snails, marine gastropod mollusks in the family Mangeliidae. Prior to a 2011 genetic revision, the genus used to be included in the family Conidae.

== Species ==
Species within the genus Kurtziella include:

- Kurtziella albocapitanea Fallon, 2026
- Kurtziella antiochroa (Pilsbry & Lowe, 1932)
- Kurtziella antipyrgus (Pilsbry & Lowe, 1932)
- Kurtziella cerina (Kurtz & Stimpson, 1851)
- Kurtziella cingulata Fallon, 2026
- Kurtziella delannoyi Fallon & Bouchet, 2026
- Kurtziella flavolineata Fallon, 2026
- Kurtziella guarapari Fallon, 2026
- Kurtziella hirschi Fallon, 2026
- Kurtziella intercedens (Melvill, 1923)
- Kurtziella kalina Fallon & Bouchet, 2026
- Kurtziella limonitella (Dall, 1884)
- Kurtziella margaritifera Fargo, 1953
- Kurtziella minor Fallon & Bouchet, 2026
- Kurtziella nana Fallon, 2026
- Kurtziella newcombei (Dall, 1919)
- Kurtziella oriens Fallon, 2026
- Kurtziella perryae Bartsch & Rehder, 1939
- Kurtziella plumbea (Hinds, 1843)
- Kurtziella powelli Shasky, 1971
- † Kurtziella precerina Pilsbry & Harbison, 1933
- † Kurtziella protatrostyla MacNeil, 1984
- † Kurtziella ramondi (Maury, 1910)
- Kurtziella rarior Fallon & Bouchet, 2026
- Kurtziella serta (Fargo, 1953)
- Kurtziella tachnodes (Dall, 1927)
- † Kurtziella thektapleura J. A. Gardner, 1938
- Kurtziella vincula Nowell-Usticke, 1969

Extinct species

- † Kurtziella limonitella margaritifera A.A. Olsson & A. Harbison, 1953
- † Kurtziella pagella W.P. Woodring, 1970
- † Kurtziella prionota J. Gardner, 1937
- † Kurtziella ramondi (C.J. Maury, 1910)
- † Kurtziella stenotella W.P. Woodring, 1970
- † Kurtziella stephanophora J. Gardner, 1937
- † Kurtziella thektapleura J. Gardner, 1937
- † Kurtziella websteri (C.J. Maury, 1910)

== Synonyms ==
- Kurtziella (Rubellatoma) diomedea (Bartsch & Rehder, 1939) : synonym of Rubellatoma diomedea Bartsch & Rehder, 1939
- Kurtziella acanthodes (Watson, 1881): synonym of Kurtziella serga (Dall, 1881), synonym of Bathyturris serga (Dall, 1881) (junior subjective synonym)
- Kurtziella accinctus (Montagu, 1808): synonym of Cryoturris dorvilliae (Reeve, 1845)
- Kurtziella alesidota Dall, W.H., 1919: synonym of Kurtziella plumbea (Hinds, 1843)
- Kurtziella atrostyla (Tryon, 1884): synonym of Kurtzia atrostyla (Tryon, 1884) (superseded combination)
- Kurtziella beta (Dall, 1919): synonym of Kurtzina beta (Dall, 1919)
- Kurtziella caribbeana Weisbord, N.E., 1962: synonym of Kurtziella dorvilliae (Reeve, 1845)
- Kurtziella cerinum (Kurtz & Stimpson, 1851): synonym of Kurtziella cerina (Kurtz & Stimpson, 1851)
- Kurtziella citronella (Dall, 1886): synonym of Cryoturris citronella (Dall, 1886), synonym of Bathyturris citronella (Dall, 1886)
- Kurtziella corallina (Watson, 1881): synonym of Kurtziella serga (Dall, 1881), synonym of Bathyturris serga (Dall, 1881) (junior subjective synonym)
- Kurtziella crebricostata (Carpenter, 1864): synonym of Mangelia crebricostata Carpenter, 1864
- Kurtziella cruzana G.W. Nowell-Usticke, 1969: synonym of Cryoturris citronella (W.H. Dall, 1886)
- Kurtziella cyrene (Dall, 1919): synonym of Kurtzina cyrene (Dall, 1919)
- Kurtziella diomedea (Bartsch & Rehder, 1939): synonym of Rubellatoma diomedea Bartsch & Rehder, 1939
- Kurtziella dorvilliae (Reeve, 1845): synonym of Cryoturris dorvilliae (Reeve, 1845) (superseded combination)
- Kurtziella hebe Dall, W.H., 1919: synonym of Kurtziella plumbea (Hinds, 1843)
- Kurtziella longa Usticke, 1969: synonym of Kurtziella dorvilliae (Reeve, 1845)
- Kurtziella quadrilineata (C. B. Adams, 1850): synonym of Cryoturris quadrilineata (C. B. Adams, 1850)
- Kurtziella quadrilineata longa (var.) Nowell-Usticke, G.W., 1969: synonym of Kurtziella dorvilliae (Reeve, 1845)
- Kurtziella rhysa (Watson, 1881): synonym of Corinnaeturris rhysa (R. B. Watson, 1881) (superseded combination)
- Kurtziella rubella (Kurtz & Stimpson, 1851): synonym of Rubellatoma rubella (Kurtz & Stimpson, 1851)
- Kurtziella serga (Dall, 1881): synonym of Bathyturris serga (Dall, 1881) (superseded combination)
- Kurtziella venezuelana Weisbord, 1962: synonym of Kurtzina venezuelana (Weisbord, 1962) ( superseded combination)
- Kurtziella vincula Nowell-Usticke, 1969: synonym of Cryoturris vincula (Nowell-Usticke, 1969)
