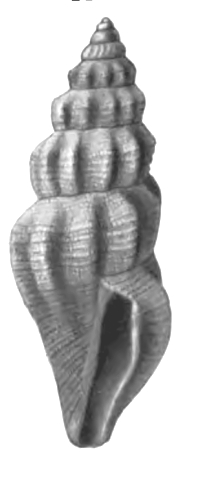
- Shell of † Cryoturris daidalea

Scientific classification
- Kingdom: Animalia
- Phylum: Mollusca
- Class: Gastropoda
- Subclass: Caenogastropoda
- Order: Neogastropoda
- Superfamily: Conoidea
- Family: Mangeliidae
- Genus: Cryoturris; Woodring, 1928

Type species
- Cryoturris engonia Woodring, W.P., 1928

Species
- See text

Synonyms
- Granoturris Fargo, 1953 junior subjective synonym; † Kurtziella (Cryoturris) Woodring, 1928 superseded rank

= Cryoturris =

Genus of gastropods

Cryoturris is a genus of sea snails, marine gastropod mollusks in the family Mangeliidae.

== Description ==
The shell is small or medium-sized, slender or moderately slender. The whorls are angulated at the periphery or rounded. The protoconch is slender or moderately slender, the apex generally rising abruptly, consisting of about 2 1/2 or 3 whorls. The body whorl or half whorl bears curved, protractive axial riblets and generally bulges at its periphery. The aperture is moderately narrow. The anterior canal is very short or hardly differentiated, slightly emarginate. The outer lip is simple, except at intervals corresponding to position of varix-like ribs. The anal notch is wide, shallow, or moderately deep. The sculpture consists of axial ribs, overridden by fine spiral threads and by microscopic frosted spiral threads.

This genus is the tropical representation of the temperate genus Kurtziella with a similar aperture and sculpture.

== Species ==
Species within the genus Cryoturris include:

- † Cryoturris aptera W.P. Woodring, 1928
- Cryoturris badia Fallon & Bouchet, 2026
- Cryoturris cerinella W.H. Dall, 1889
- Cryoturris daidalea J.A. Gardner, 1947
- Cryoturris delicatior Fallon & Bouchet, 2026
- † Cryoturris dianema W.P. Woodring, 1928
- † Cryoturris dominicensis W.M. Gabb, 1873
- Cryoturris dorvilliae (Reeve, 1845)
- Cryoturris eburnea Fallon & Bouchet, 2026
- Cryoturris edithae G.W. Nowell-Usticke, 1971
- † Cryoturris engonia W.P. Woodring, 1928
- † Cryoturris etrema W.P. Woodring, 1928
- † Cryoturris euengonia W.P. Woodring, 1928
- Cryoturris fargoi T.L. McGinty, 1955
- † Cryoturris hillsboroughensis W.C. Mansfield, 1937
- Cryoturris holimanae Fallon, 2026
- † Cryoturris lalonensis C.J. Maury, 1917
- Cryoturris lizae Fallon, 2026
- † Cryoturris maesi L.D. Campbell, 1993
- Cryoturris maestratii Fallon & Bouchet, 2026
- † Cryoturris magnoliana A.A. Olsson, 1916
- † Cryoturris magnoliana chariessa J.A. Gardner, 1948
- † Cryoturris nexilis W.P. Woodring, 1928
- † Cryoturris nisis W.P. Woodring, 1928
- Cryoturris olsoni Fallon & Bouchet, 2026
- Cryoturris pelican Fallon, 2026
- Cryoturris presleyi (W. G. Lyons, 1972)
- Cryoturris procera Fallon & Bouchet, 2026
- Cryoturris rapa Fallon & Bouchet, 2026
- Cryoturris redferni Fallon & Bouchet, 2026
- Cryoturris robusta Fallon & Bouchet, 2026
- Cryoturris seizovae Fallon, 2026
- Cryoturris septentrionalis Fallon, 2026
- Cryoturris simplex Fallon & Bouchet, 2026
- Cryoturris slapcinskyi Fallon & Bouchet, 2026
- Cryoturris texana Fallon, 2026
- Cryoturris tortugana Fallon, 2026
- Cryoturris usitata Fallon & Bouchet, 2026
- Cryoturris voluta Fallon, 2026

== Synonyms ==
- Cryoturris adamsii E.A. Smith, 1884: synonym of Pleurotoma (Clathurella) adamsii E. A. Smith, 1884
- Cryoturris citronella W.H. Dall, 1886: synonym of Bathyturris citronella (Dall, 1886)
- Cryoturris diadema W.P. Woodring, 1928 : synonym of Cryoturris dianema W.P. Woodring, 1928
- Cryoturris dorvilliae (Reeve, 1845): synonym of Kurtziella dorvilliae (Reeve, 1845)
- Cryoturris elata (Dall, 1889): synonym of Platycythara elata (Dall, 1889)
- Cryoturris filifera (Dall, 1881): synonym of Gymnobela filifera (Dall, 1881)
- † Cryoturris habra W.P. Woodring, 1970: synonym of † Kurtziella (Cryoturris) habra Woodring, 1970 (uncertain, unassessed)
- Cryoturris lavalleana A. d'Orbigny, 1847: synonym of Vitricythara lavalleana (A. d'Orbigny, 1853) (superseded combination)
- Cryoturris quadrilineata C.B. Adams, 1850: synonym of Cryoturris dorvilliae (Reeve, 1845)
- Cryoturris serga (Dall, 1881): synonym of Kurtziella serga (Dall, 1881), synonym of Bathyturris serga (Dall, 1881)
- † Cryoturris serta W.G. Fargo, 1953: synonym of Kurtziella serta (Fargo, 1953) (superseded combination)
- Cryoturris trilineata (Adams C. B., 1845): synonym of Tenaturris trilineata (C. B. Adams, 1845), synonym of Pyrgocythara trilineata (C. B. Adams, 1845) (superseded combination)
- Cryoturris vincula G.W. Nowell-Usticke, 1969: synonym of Kurtziella vincula Nowell-Usticke, 1969 (superseded combination)
