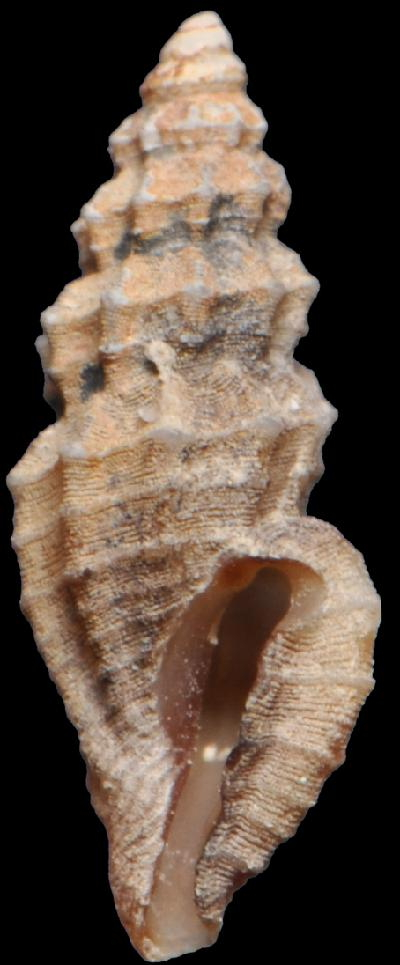
- Shell of Acmaturris sp. (museum specimen at MNHN, Paris)

Scientific classification
- Kingdom: Animalia
- Phylum: Mollusca
- Class: Gastropoda
- Subclass: Caenogastropoda
- Order: Neogastropoda
- Superfamily: Conoidea
- Family: Mangeliidae
- Genus: Acmaturris; Woodring, 1928

Type species
- † Acmaturris comparata Woodring, W.P., 1928

Species
- See text

= Acmaturris =

Genus of gastropods

Acmaturris is a genus of minute sea snails, marine gastropod mollusks or micromollusks in the family Mangeliidae.

== Description ==
(Original description) The medium-sized shell is slender or moderately slender. The protoconch is broad-tipped, consisting of about 2½ whorls, the last one sculptured with curved, protractive, axial riblets that may be swollen on a peripheral keel. The aperture is long and moderately narrow. The anterior canal is short and unemarginate. The outer lip is strongly varicose, the edge frilled. The anal notch is moderately deep and is broadly rounded. The parietal callus thickened the adjoining notch. The sculpture consists of narrow axial ribs and of strong spiral threads, and also of microscopic frosted spiral threads.

== Distribution ==
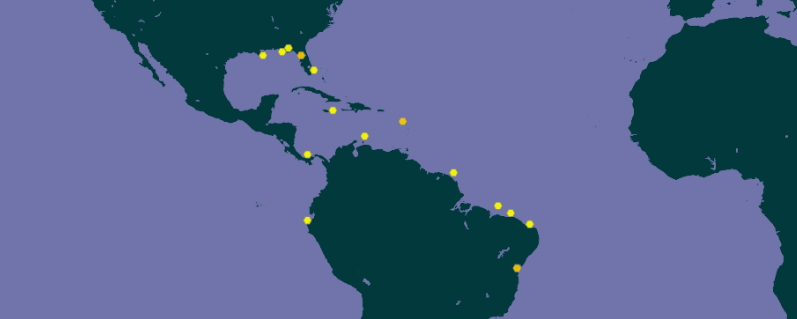
Distribution

This species occurs in the Caribbean Sea off Guadeloupe and French Guyana.

Fossils were found in Miocene strata in Jamaica.

== Species ==
Species within the genus Acmaturris include:

- Acmaturris ampla McLean & Poorman, 1971
- Acmaturris brisis Woodring, 1928
- † Acmaturris comparata Woodring, 1928
- Acmaturris pelicanus Garcia, 2008
- † Acmaturris scalida Woodring 1928

Species brought into synonymy

- Acmaturris annaclaireleeae García, 2008: synonym of Pyrgocythara annaclaireleeae (García, 2008)
- Acmaturris metria (Dall, 1903): synonym of Vitricythara metria (Dall, 1903)
- Acmaturris vatovai Nordsieck, 1971: synonym of Kurtziella serga (Dall, 1881)
