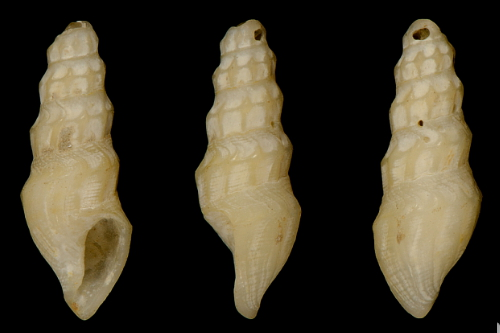
- Shell of Cryoturris cerinella (syntype at the Smithsonian Institution)

Scientific classification
- Kingdom: Animalia
- Phylum: Mollusca
- Class: Gastropoda
- Subclass: Caenogastropoda
- Order: Neogastropoda
- Superfamily: Conoidea
- Family: Mangeliidae
- Genus: Cryoturris
- Species: C. cerinella

Binomial name
- Cryoturris cerinella (Dall, 1889)

Synonyms
- Mangilia cerinella Dall, 1889

= Cryoturris cerinella =

Species of gastropod

Cryoturris cerinella, common name the little waxy mangelia, is a species of sea snail, a marine gastropod mollusk in the family Mangeliidae.

== Description ==
The length of the shell varies between 6 mm and 12 mm.

Cryoturris cerinella recalls Kurtziella cerina (Kurtz & Stimpson, 1851) by its color, but it is much larger, more drawn out and slender. The shell contains 7 whorls, omitting the protoconch. It has only six or at most seven ribs, a short aperture, no siphonal canal to speak of, and hardly any indentation for a notch. The suture is less appressed and undulate. While the ribs are almost obsolete in the fasciolar region, the angulation is nearly at the periphery and the slopes either way from it are nearly equal. The shell is whitish toward the vertex, ashy on the intermediate whorls, and with a tendency to orange or flesh-color for the body whorl. It is never striped or spotted, and the columella is always like the rest of the body whorl.

== Distribution ==
C. cerinella can be found in Atlantic Ocean waters, ranging from the coast of North Carolina south to Quintana Roo.; in the Gulf of Mexico and the Caribbean Sea.
