= Cryoturris albida =

Scientific classification
- Kingdom: Animalia
- Phylum: Mollusca
- Class: Gastropoda
- Subclass: Caenogastropoda
- Order: Neogastropoda
- Superfamily: Conoidea
- Family: Mangeliidae
- Genus: Cryoturris
- Species: C. albida

Binomial name
- Cryoturris albida (C.B. Adams, 1845)

Synonyms
- Pleurotoma albida C.B. Adams, 1845 (uncertain name - unassessed by WoRMS); Pleurotoma fusiformis C.B. Adams, 1850

Species of gastropod

Cryoturris albida is a species of sea snail, a marine gastropod mollusk in the family Mangeliidae.

== Distribution ==
This marine species can be found off Jamaica
