= Crassispira aegis =

Scientific classification
- Kingdom: Animalia
- Phylum: Mollusca
- Class: Gastropoda
- Subclass: Caenogastropoda
- Order: Neogastropoda
- Superfamily: Conoidea
- Family: Pseudomelatomidae
- Genus: Crassispira
- Species: C. aegis

Binomial name
- Crassispira aegis Woodring 1928

Synonyms
- † Crassispira (Crassispira) aegis Woodring 1928

Extinct species of gastropod

Crassispira aegis is an extinct species of sea snail, a marine gastropod mollusk in the family Pseudomelatomidae, the turrids and allies.

== Description ==
The length of the shell attains 45.8 mm; its diameter is 13.6 mm.

== Distribution ==
Fossils have been found in Pliocene strata of the Bowden Formation of Jamaica; also on Saint Thomas; age range: 3.6 to 2.588 Ma.
