= Platycythara eurystoma =

Scientific classification
- Kingdom: Animalia
- Phylum: Mollusca
- Class: Gastropoda
- Subclass: Caenogastropoda
- Order: Neogastropoda
- Superfamily: Conoidea
- Family: Mangeliidae
- Genus: Platycythara
- Species: P. eurystoma

Binomial name
- Platycythara eurystoma Woodring 1928

Extinct species of gastropod

Platycythara eurystoma, is an extinct species of sea snail, a marine gastropod mollusk in the family Mangeliidae.

== Distribution ==
This extinct species was found in Pliocene strata of the Bowden Formation, Jamaica.
