= Acmaturris scalida =

Scientific classification
- Kingdom: Animalia
- Phylum: Mollusca
- Class: Gastropoda
- Subclass: Caenogastropoda
- Order: Neogastropoda
- Superfamily: Conoidea
- Family: Mangeliidae
- Genus: Acmaturris
- Species: †A. scalida

Binomial name
- †Acmaturris scalida Woodring, 1928

Extinct species of gastropod

Acmaturris scalida is an extinct species of sea snail, a marine gastropod mollusk in the family Mangeliidae.

== Description ==
The length of the shell attains 11.2 mm, its diameter 3.9 mm.

(Original description) The slender shell is relatively large. The protoconch consists of between two and a half and three whorls, the last whorl bearing a strong keel, lying behind middle, on which the axial riblets are swollen into beads. The riblets do not extend forward beyond the keel.

The sculpture consists of axial ribs (13 to 15 on penultimate whorl), overridden by spiral threads (4 to 6 on penultimate whorl). A secondary spiral thread may appear in interspaces. Microscopic axials and spirals visible in interspaces.

== Distribution ==
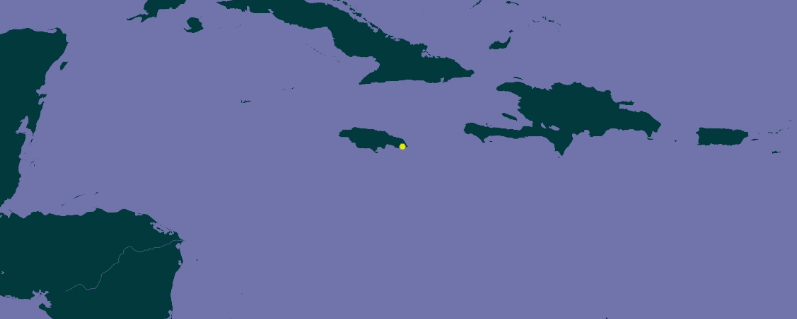
Distribution

Fossils have been found in Pliocene strata of the Bowden Formation, Jamaica, age range: 3.6 to 2.588 Ma
