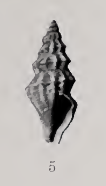
- Shell (U.S. Nat. Mus. No. 135391)

Scientific classification
- Kingdom: Animalia
- Phylum: Mollusca
- Class: Gastropoda
- Subclass: Caenogastropoda
- Order: Neogastropoda
- Superfamily: Conoidea
- Family: Mangeliidae
- Genus: Cryoturris
- Species: C. euengonia

Binomial name
- Cryoturris euengonia Woodring, 1928

Synonyms
- † Kurtziella (Cryoturris) euengonia Woodring 1928

= Cryoturris euengonia =

Extinct species of gastropod

Cryoturris euengonia is an extinct species of sea snail, a marine gastropod mollusk in the family Mangeliidae.

== Description ==
The length of the shell attains 4.6 mm, its diameter 2.4 mm. The shell is small and fairly thick, with each spiral turn having a noticeable sharp edge around its outer margin. The tip of the shell is narrow and rises sharply, containing about two and a half to three turns; the last half turn is slightly swollen and marked with small lengthwise ridges. The front extension of the shell opening is short but tightly narrowed, while the notch near the outer lip is shallow. The shell’s surface pattern includes about twelve vertical ribs on the second-to-last whorl, crossed by fine spiral lines, with the line around the outer edge being the most prominent, along with extremely tiny spiral threads that give a faint rough or frosted texture. On the final and largest whorl, the ribs become thicker and spaced farther apart.

== Distribution ==
This extinct marine species has been found in Pliocene strata of the Bowden Formation, Jamaica; age range: 3.6 to 2.588 Ma.
