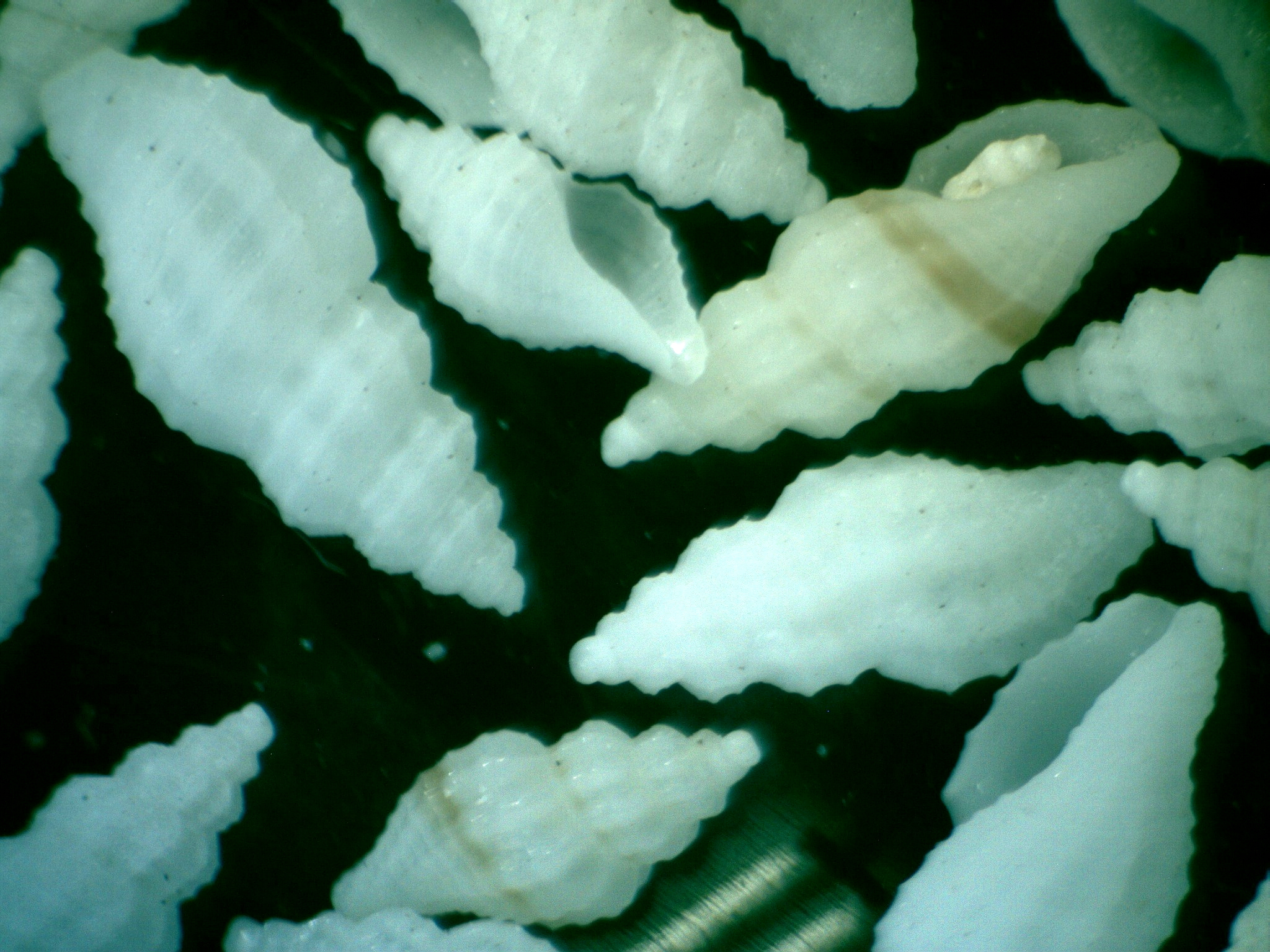
- Shells of Acmaturris brisis

Scientific classification
- Kingdom: Animalia
- Phylum: Mollusca
- Class: Gastropoda
- Subclass: Caenogastropoda
- Order: Neogastropoda
- Superfamily: Conoidea
- Family: Mangeliidae
- Genus: Acmaturris
- Species: A. brisis

Binomial name
- Acmaturris brisis Woodring, 1928

= Acmaturris brisis =

Species of gastropod

Acmaturris brisis is a species of sea snail, a marine gastropod mollusk in the family Mangeliidae.

== Description ==
The length of the shell attains 8.3 mm, its diameter 2.9 mm.

(Original description) The medium-sized shell is slender. The protoconch consists of between two and a half and three whorls, the last one sculptured with closely spaced axialriblets.

The sculpture is reticulate, consisting of narrow axial ribs (14 or 15 on penultimate whorl), barely curved on the anal fasciole, overridden by spiral threads (3 or 4 on penultimate whorl). The interspaces bear microscopic spiral threads, some of which may be relatively strong, frosted by microscopic axials.

== Distribution ==
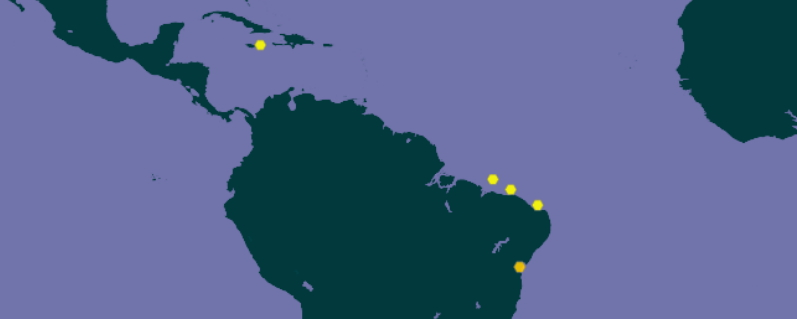
distribution

This marine species occurs off Brazil. Fossils have been found in Pliocene strata of the Bowden Formation, Jamaica, age range: 3.6 to 2.588 Ma.
