= Crassispira lomata =

Scientific classification
- Kingdom: Animalia
- Phylum: Mollusca
- Class: Gastropoda
- Subclass: Caenogastropoda
- Order: Neogastropoda
- Superfamily: Conoidea
- Family: Pseudomelatomidae
- Genus: Crassispira
- Species: C. lomata

Binomial name
- Crassispira lomata Woodring 1928

Synonyms
- † Crassispira (Crassispira) lomata Woodring 1928

Extinct species of gastropod

Crassispira lomata is an extinct species of sea snail, a marine gastropod mollusk in the family Pseudomelatomidae, the turrids and allies.

== Description ==
The length of the shell attains 14.6 mm (0.57 in); its diameter 5.6 mm (0.22 in).

== Distribution ==
Fossils have been found in Pliocene strata of the Bowden Formation of Saint Thomas, Jamaica, in the age range of 3.6 to 2.588 Ma.
