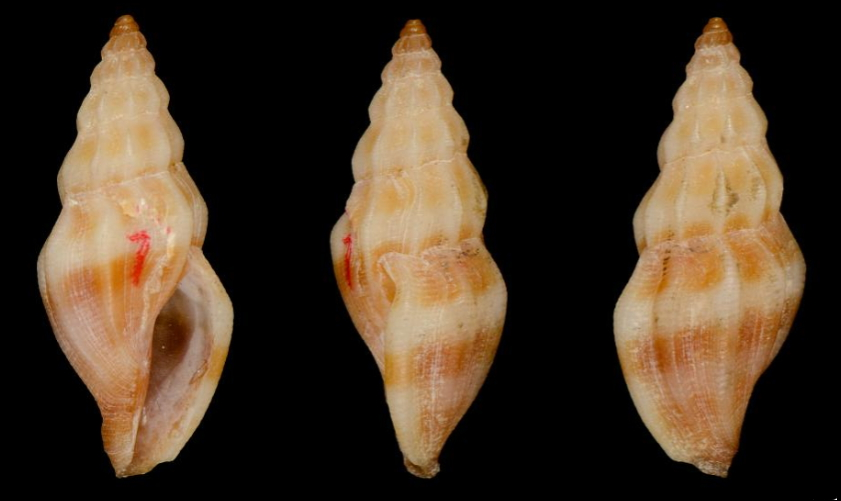
- Rubellatoma diomedea

Scientific classification
- Kingdom: Animalia
- Phylum: Mollusca
- Class: Gastropoda
- Subclass: Caenogastropoda
- Order: Neogastropoda
- Superfamily: Conoidea
- Family: Mangeliidae
- Genus: Rubellatoma; Bartsch & Rehder, 1939

Type species
- Mangelia rubella Kurtz & Stimpson, 1851

Species
- See text

Synonyms
- Kurtziella (Rubellatoma) Bartsch & Rehder, 1939 · > superseded rank

= Rubellatoma =

Genus of gastropods

Rubellatoma is a genus of sea snails, marine gastropod mollusks in the family Mangeliidae.

== Species ==
Species within the genus Rubellatoma include:

- Rubellatoma brasiliensis Fallon, 2026
- Rubellatoma brevis Fallon & Bouchet, 2026
- Rubellatoma castanea Fallon, 2026
- Rubellatoma diomedea Bartsch & Rehder, 1939
- Rubellatoma edithae (Nowell-Usticke, 1971)
- Rubellatoma hondurasensis Fallon, 2026
- Rubellatoma nivea Fallon & Bouchet, 2026
- Rubellatoma nodosa Fallon & Bouchet, 2026
- Rubellatoma rubella (Kurtz & Stimpson, 1851)
- Rubellatoma rufocincta (E.A. Smith, 1882)
- Rubellatoma vitrea Fallon, 2026

Species brought into synonymy

- Rubellatoma elata (Dall, 1889): synonym of Platycythara elata (Dall, 1889)
