= Acmaturris comparata =

Scientific classification
- Kingdom: Animalia
- Phylum: Mollusca
- Class: Gastropoda
- Subclass: Caenogastropoda
- Order: Neogastropoda
- Superfamily: Conoidea
- Family: Mangeliidae
- Genus: Acmaturris
- Species: A. comparata

Binomial name
- Acmaturris comparata Woodring, 1928

Extinct species of gastropod

Acmaturris comparata is an extinct species of sea snail, a marine gastropod mollusk in the family Mangeliidae.

== Description ==
The length of the shell attains 8.4 mm, its diameter 3.4 mm.

(Original description) The medium-sized shell is relatively stout. The whorls are strongly constricted. The protoconch consists of two and a half whorls, the last one bearing an obscure peripheral keel and sculptured with axial riblets.

The sculpture of the shell is reticulate, consisting of narrow axial ribs (10 to 12 on penultimate whorl), slightly curved on the anal fasciole, overridden by strong spiral threads (3 or 4 on penultimate whorl). In the interspaces lie microscopic frosted spirals.

== Distribution ==
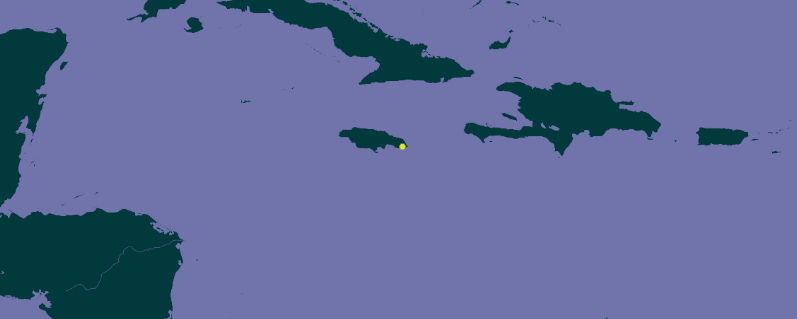
distribution

Fossils have been found in Pliocene strata of the Bowden Formation, Jamaica, age range: 3.6 to 2.588 Ma
