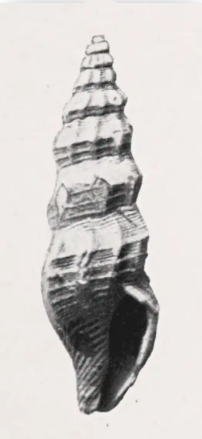
- Shell of Cryoturris etrema (holotype)

Scientific classification
- Kingdom: Animalia
- Phylum: Mollusca
- Class: Gastropoda
- Subclass: Caenogastropoda
- Order: Neogastropoda
- Superfamily: Conoidea
- Family: Mangeliidae
- Genus: Cryoturris
- Species: C. etrema

Binomial name
- Cryoturris etrema Woodring, 1928

Synonyms
- † Kurtziella (Cryoturris) etrema Woodring 1928

= Cryoturris etrema =

Extinct species of gastropod

Cryoturris etrema is an extinct species of sea snail, a marine gastropod mollusk in the family Mangeliidae.

== Description ==
The length of the shell attains 8.5 mm, its diameter 2.7 mm. The shell is medium-sized and slender. Its protoconch is relatively large and stout with a small tip and consists of about three whorls, the last of which bears fine axial riblets that scarcely reach beyond a peripheral keel. The anterior siphonal canal is barely differentiated and the anal notch is moderately shallow. The sculpture comprises widely spaced axial ribs, about seven on the penultimate whorl, overridden by fine spiral threads and microscopic frosted spiral threads. Larger than the related species of Cryoturris found with it, it has fewer ribs and a more rapidly enlarging nucleus, and is known from five specimens; in the worn holotype the ribs are abraded and the outer lip and apex are broken. The holotype is held in the National Museum of Natural History (catalogue no. USNM 369395).

== Distribution ==
This extinct marine species has been found in Pliocene strata of the Bowden Formation, Jamaica; age range: 3.6 to 2.588 Ma.
