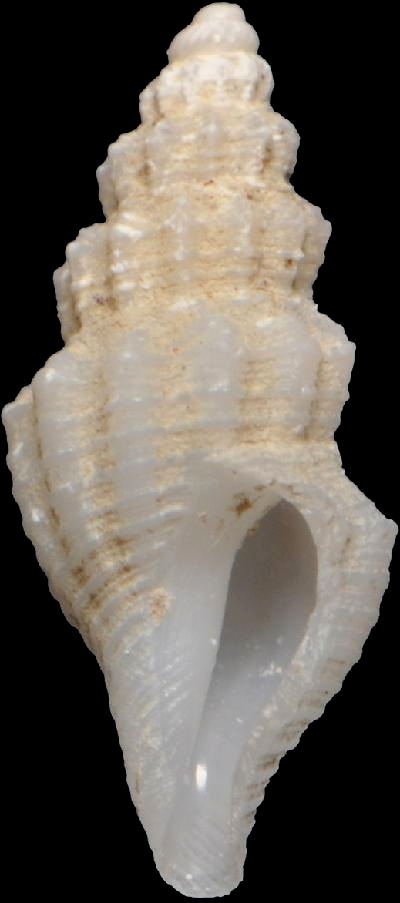
- Shell of Vitricythara metria (museum specimen at MNHN, Paris)

Scientific classification
- Kingdom: Animalia
- Phylum: Mollusca
- Class: Gastropoda
- Subclass: Caenogastropoda
- Order: Neogastropoda
- Superfamily: Conoidea
- Family: Mangeliidae
- Genus: Vitricythara; Fargo, 1953

Type species
- † Cythara metria Dall, 1903

Species
- See text

= Vitricythara =

Genus of gastropods

Vitricythara is a genus of sea snails, marine gastropod mollusks in the family Mangeliidae.

== Species ==
- Vitricythara fassioae Fallon & Bouchet, 2026
- Vitricythara formosa Fallon & Bouchet, 2026
- Vitricythara lavalleana (A. d'Orbigny, 1853)
- Vitricythara magnini Fallon & Bouchet, 2026
- Vitricythara marissae Fallon, 2026
- † Vitricythara metria (Dall, 1903)
- † Vitricythara micromeris (Dall, 1903)

Species brought into synonymy

- Vitricythara elata (Dall, 1889): synonym of Platycythara elata (Dall, 1889)
- Vitricythara lavalleana (d'Orbigny, 1847): synonym of Cryoturris lavalleana (d'Orbigny, 1847)
