= Cupuladria elegans =

Cupuladria elegans Temporal range: Holocene

Scientific classification
- Kingdom: Animalia
- Phylum: Bryozoa
- Class: Gymnolaemata
- Order: Cheilostomatida
- Family: Cupuladriidae
- Genus: Cupuladria
- Species: C. elegans

Binomial name
- Cupuladria elegans Lu, 1991

Species of moss animal

Cupuladria elegans is a species of bryozoans in the suborder Flustrina. It is a Holocene species from the Nansha Islands sea area.
