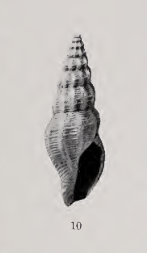
- Shell with apex broken (U.S. Nat. Mus. No. 369397)

Scientific classification
- Kingdom: Animalia
- Phylum: Mollusca
- Class: Gastropoda
- Subclass: Caenogastropoda
- Order: Neogastropoda
- Superfamily: Conoidea
- Family: Mangeliidae
- Genus: Cryoturris
- Species: C. aptera

Binomial name
- Cryoturris aptera Woodring, 1928

Synonyms
- † Kurtziella (Cryoturris) aptera Woodring 1928

= Cryoturris aptera =

Extinct species of gastropod

Cryoturris aptera is an extinct species of sea snail, a marine gastropod mollusk in the family Mangeliidae.

== Description ==
The length of the shell attains 11.4 mm, its diameter 3.9 mm. The shell is much larger and thicker than other described species. The early part of the shell (nucleus) is also fairly large and thick and likely has about 2½ to 3 whorls. On the last whorl, there are small vertical ribs, but they do not extend much past a ridge around the shell's edge. The opening of the shell (aperture) is wide. The front canal is very short, and the siphonal fasciole (a slightly raised area near the canal) bulges slightly outward.

The shell's surface pattern (sculpture) includes about 11 broad vertical ribs on the second-to-last whorl. These ribs are crossed by very fine spiral lines of three different sizes, and all of them have a slightly rough or frosted texture.

== Distribution ==
This extinct marine species has been found in Pliocene strata of the Bowden Formation, Jamaica; age range: 3.6 to 2.588 Ma.

== Records ==
The type material is stored as U.S. Nat. Mus. No. 369397.
