= Cryoturris nexilis =

Scientific classification
- Kingdom: Animalia
- Phylum: Mollusca
- Class: Gastropoda
- Subclass: Caenogastropoda
- Order: Neogastropoda
- Superfamily: Conoidea
- Family: Mangeliidae
- Genus: Cryoturris
- Species: C. nexilis

Binomial name
- Cryoturris nexilis Woodring, 1928

Synonyms
- † Kurtziella (Cryoturris) nexilis Woodring 1928

Extinct species of gastropod

Cryoturris nexilis is an extinct species of sea snail, a marine gastropod mollusk in the family Mangeliidae.

== Description ==
The length of the shell attains 5.3 mm, its diameter is 1.9 mm.

== Distribution ==
This extinct marine species has been found in Pliocene strata of the Bowden Formation, Jamaica; age range: 3.6 to 2.588 Ma.
