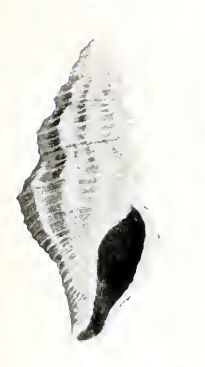
- Original image of a shell of Kurtzina cyrene

Scientific classification
- Kingdom: Animalia
- Phylum: Mollusca
- Class: Gastropoda
- Subclass: Caenogastropoda
- Order: Neogastropoda
- Superfamily: Conoidea
- Family: Mangeliidae
- Genus: Kurtzina; Bartsch, 1944

Type species
- Mangilia beta Dall, 1919

Species
- See text

= Kurtzina =

Genus of gastropods

Kurtzina is a genus of small, predatory sea snails, marine gastropod mollusks in the family Mangeliidae.

== Species ==
Species within the genus Kurtzina include:

- Kurtzina beta (Dall, 1919)
- Kurtzina crossata (Dall, 1927)
- Kurtzina cyrene (Dall, 1919)
- Kurtzina garciai Fallon, 2026
- Kurtzina texana Fallon, 2026
- Kurtzina venezuelana (Weisbord, 1962)

Synonyms

- Kurtzina cymatias (H.A. Pilsbry & H.N. Lowe, 1932): synonym of Kurtziella antiochroa (Pilsbry & H. N. Lowe, 1932)
