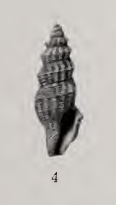
- Shell (U.S. Nat. Mus. No. 135406)

Scientific classification
- Kingdom: Animalia
- Phylum: Mollusca
- Class: Gastropoda
- Subclass: Caenogastropoda
- Order: Neogastropoda
- Family: Mangeliidae
- Genus: Cryoturris
- Species: C. engonia

Binomial name
- Cryoturris engonia Woodring, 1928

= Cryoturris engonia =

Extinct species of gastropod

Cryoturris engonia is an extinct species of sea snail, a marine gastropod mollusk in the family Mangeliidae.

== Description ==
The length of the shell attains 4.7 mm, its diameter 1.8 mm. The shell is small and narrow, with each spiral turn having a noticeable angled edge around the outer margin. The tip of the shell is thin and rises sharply, made up of about two and a half turns. The last half turn of this early section bulges slightly at the outer edge and has small lengthwise ridges. The anterior canal (the short tube-like extension at the shell opening) is short, while the anal notch near the outer lip is moderately deep. The surface pattern includes narrow vertical ribs, about 16 on the second-to-last whorl, crossed by fine but fairly strong spiral lines, with four of these spirals on that whorl and the one at the outer edge being the most prominent. There are also extremely tiny spiral lines that give the surface a faint rough or frosted look. On the last half of the main body whorl, there are four thicker ribs that resemble varices.

== Distribution ==
This extinct marine species has been found in Pliocene strata of the Bowden Formation, Jamaica; age range: 3.6 to 2.588 Ma.
