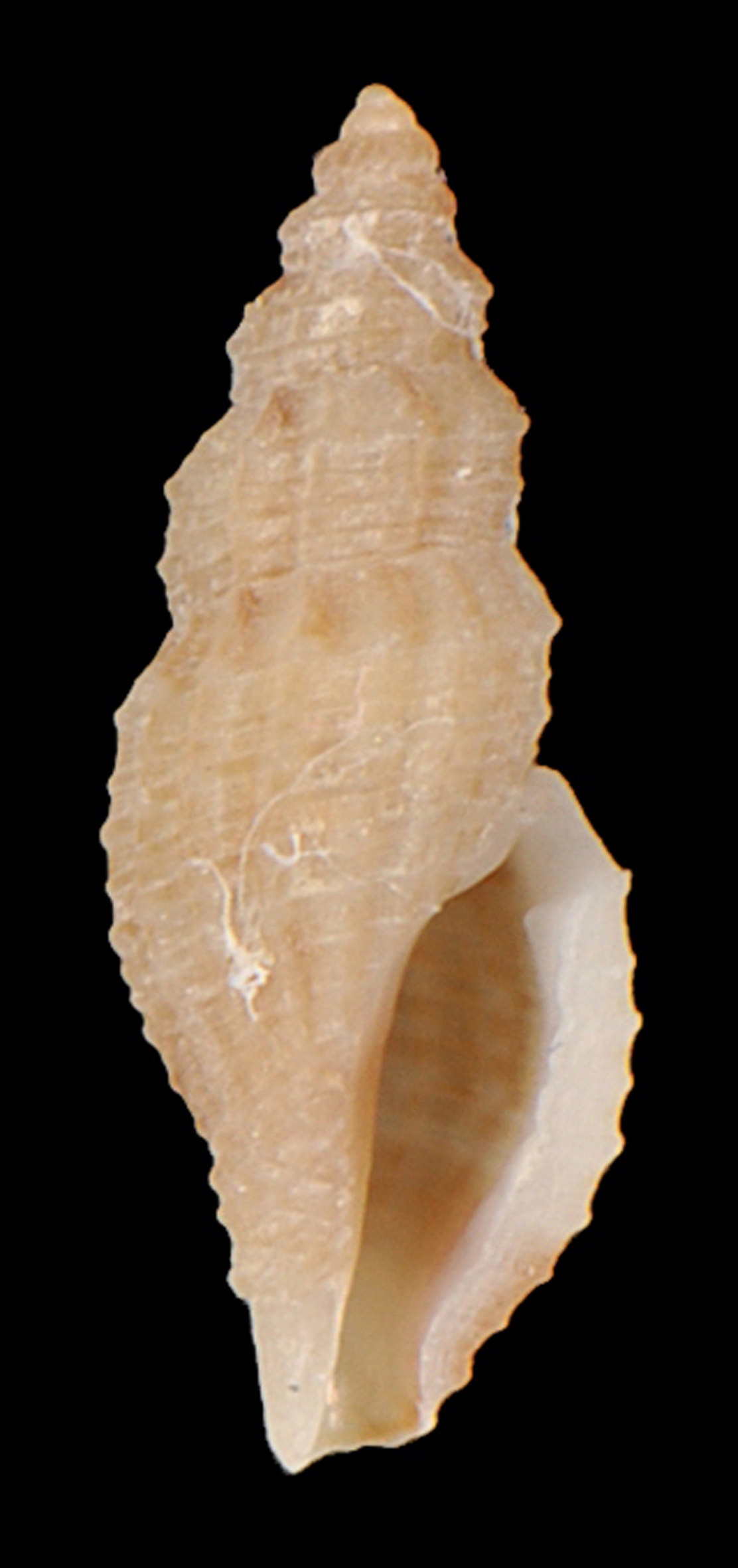
- Shell of Platycythara elata

Scientific classification
- Kingdom: Animalia
- Phylum: Mollusca
- Class: Gastropoda
- Subclass: Caenogastropoda
- Order: Neogastropoda
- Superfamily: Conoidea
- Family: Mangeliidae
- Genus: Platycythara; Woodring, 1928

Type species
- † Platycythara eurystoma Woodring, 1928

Species
- See text

= Platycythara =

Genus of gastropods

Platycythara is a genus of sea snails, marine gastropod mollusks in the family Mangeliidae.

== Species ==
Species within the genus Platycythara include:

- Platycythara curta (Dall, 1919)
- Platycythara elata (Dall, 1889)
- Platycythara electra (Dall, 1919)
- † Platycythara eurystoma W.P. Woodring, 1928

Species brought intoi synonymy

- † Platycythara metria (Dall 1903): synonym of Vitricythara metria (Dall, 1903)
