= Kurtzina crossata =

Scientific classification
- Kingdom: Animalia
- Phylum: Mollusca
- Class: Gastropoda
- Subclass: Caenogastropoda
- Order: Neogastropoda
- Superfamily: Conoidea
- Family: Mangeliidae
- Genus: Kurtzina
- Species: K. crossata

Binomial name
- Kurtzina crossata (Dall, 1927)

Synonyms
- Mangilia crossata Dall, 1927 (original combination)

Species of gastropod

Kurtzina crossata is a species of sea snail, a marine gastropod mollusk in the family Mangeliidae.

== Description ==
The length of the shell attains 6 mm, its diameter 3 mm.

== Distribution ==
This marine species occurs from Georgia to Florida, USA
