= Kurtziella antipyrgus =

Scientific classification
- Kingdom: Animalia
- Phylum: Mollusca
- Class: Gastropoda
- Subclass: Caenogastropoda
- Order: Neogastropoda
- Superfamily: Conoidea
- Family: Mangeliidae
- Genus: Kurtziella
- Species: K. antipyrgus

Binomial name
- Kurtziella antipyrgus (Pilsbry & Lowe, 1932)

Synonyms
- Mangelia (Kurtziella) antipyrgus Pilsbry & Lowe, 1932

Species of gastropod

Kurtziella antipyrgus is a species of sea snail, a marine gastropod mollusk in the family Mangeliidae.

== Description ==
The length of the shell varies between 7 mm and 10 mm, its diameter 2.5 mm.

== Distribution ==
This marine species occurs in the Pacific Ocean from Acapulco, Pacific Mexico, Mexico to Ecuador.
