= Platycythara curta =

Scientific classification
- Kingdom: Animalia
- Phylum: Mollusca
- Class: Gastropoda
- Subclass: Caenogastropoda
- Order: Neogastropoda
- Superfamily: Conoidea
- Family: Mangeliidae
- Genus: Platycythara
- Species: P. curta

Binomial name
- Platycythara curta (Dall, 1919)

Synonyms
- Zetekia curta Dall, 1919

Species of gastropod

Platycythara curta is a species of sea snail, a marine gastropod mollusk in the family Mangeliidae.

== Description ==
The length of the shell is 2.3 m, its diameter 1.5 mm.

(Original description) The small, short, solid, inflated shell has a brownish color,. The minute protoconch is smooth. It is succeeded by about three subsequent strongly sculptured whorls. The suture is distinct. The axial sculpture consists of (on the penultimate whorl about 15) narrow, sharp, similar riblets with wider interspace. This sculpture extends over the base. The spiral sculpture consists of (on the body whorl about 16) even regular similar threads with subequal interspaces which pass over but do not nodulate the ribs. The aperture is narrow. The outer lip is thickened, crenulate by the sculpture and not reflected. The anal sulcus is shallow but conspicuous. The columellar lip is smooth. The columella shows a layer of enamel with a raised edge. The siphonal canal is short, deep, but hardly differentiated.

== Distribution ==
This marine species occurs off Pacific Panama.
