= Kurtzia kilburni =

Scientific classification
- Kingdom: Animalia
- Phylum: Mollusca
- Class: Gastropoda
- Subclass: Caenogastropoda
- Order: Neogastropoda
- Superfamily: Conoidea
- Family: Mangeliidae
- Genus: Kurtzia
- Species: K. kilburni

Binomial name
- Kurtzia kilburni Nielsen (2003)

Extinct species of gastropod

Kurtzia kilburni is an extinct species of sea snail, a marine gastropod mollusk in the family Mangeliidae.

== Description ==
The length of the shell could attain 10mm in length which is relatively small compared to other sea snails, and is typically brown or gray in color. Its shell shape, which is usually spiral, helps to protect its soft body from predators.

The Kurtzia Kilburni, a species of sea snail, can be found in the subtidal zones of the ocean, which are areas below the lowest tide level, typically between 10-200 meters deep.

The fossil record shows that Kurtzia Kilburni, a type of sea snail, has been around for approximately 10 million years.

== Distribution ==
This extinct marine species was found in Miocene strata of Central Chile, Chile.
