= Kurtzia humboldti =

Scientific classification
- Kingdom: Animalia
- Phylum: Mollusca
- Class: Gastropoda
- Subclass: Caenogastropoda
- Order: Neogastropoda
- Superfamily: Conoidea
- Family: Mangeliidae
- Genus: Kurtzia
- Species: K. humboldti

Binomial name
- Kurtzia humboldti McLean & Poorman, 1971

Species of gastropod

Kurtzia humboldti is a species of sea snail, a marine gastropod mollusk in the family Mangeliidae.

== Distribution ==
This marine species occurs off the Galapagos Islands
