= Platycythara electra =

Scientific classification
- Kingdom: Animalia
- Phylum: Mollusca
- Class: Gastropoda
- Subclass: Caenogastropoda
- Order: Neogastropoda
- Superfamily: Conoidea
- Family: Mangeliidae
- Genus: Platycythara
- Species: P. electra

Binomial name
- Platycythara electra (Dall, 1919)

Synonyms
- Cytharella electra Dall, 1919

Species of gastropod

Platycythara electra is a species of sea snail, a marine gastropod mollusk in the family Mangeliidae.

== Description ==
The length of the shell attains 5.5 mm, its diameter 2 mm.

(Original description) The minute shell is waxen white, sometimes with faint purplish spiral bands. The protoconch contains 2½, whorls. The protoconch is turbinate, the first two whorls are smooth, polished, brown. It is followed by 4½ subsequent reticulate whorls. These are axially minutely ribbed, the sculpture passing into that of the normal subsequent whorls. The suture is distinct, not appressed. The spiral sculpture between the succeeding suture and the fasciole on the spire, consists of four equal and equally spaced threads with slightly wider interspaces. Rarely the posterior thread is more prominent than the others. On the body whorl there are about nine threads, more adjacent as they approach the siphonal canal which has about six more closely set. The axial sculpture consists of (on the body whorl about 14) low narrow straight ribs extending from the suture to the siphonal canal with slightly narrower interspaces. There is no nodulation at the intersections with the spiral sculpture and the reticulations are squarish and deep. The aperture is narrow. The anal sulcus is shallow, rounded and conspicuous. The outer lip is varicose, sharp edged, not lirate within. The inner lip is erased. The siphonal canal is hardly differentiated.

== Distribution ==
This marine species was found was found off the Head of Concepcion Bay, Gulf of California
