= Cryoturris habra =

Scientific classification
- Kingdom: Animalia
- Phylum: Mollusca
- Class: Gastropoda
- Subclass: Caenogastropoda
- Order: Neogastropoda
- Superfamily: Conoidea
- Family: Mangeliidae
- Genus: Cryoturris
- Species: C. habra

Binomial name
- Cryoturris habra W.P. Woodring, 1970

Synonyms
- † Kurtziella (Cryoturris) habra Woodring 1970

Extinct species of gastropod

Cryoturris habra is an extinct species of sea snail, a marine gastropod mollusk in the family Mangeliidae.

== Description ==
The length of the shell attains 5.2 mm, its diameter 1.9 mm.

== Distribution ==
This extinct marine species has been found in the lower part of the Gatun Formation of Panama.
