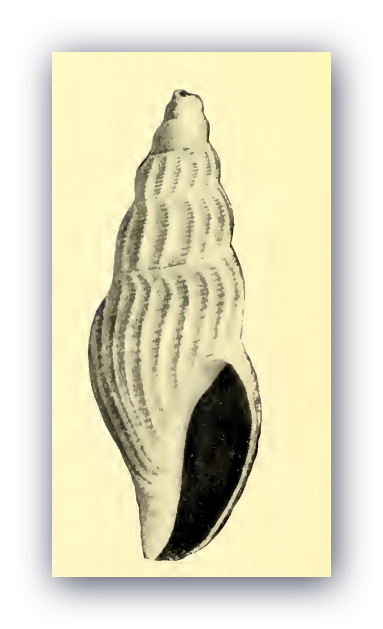
- Image of a shell of Kurtziella plumbea

Scientific classification
- Kingdom: Animalia
- Phylum: Mollusca
- Class: Gastropoda
- Subclass: Caenogastropoda
- Order: Neogastropoda
- Superfamily: Conoidea
- Family: Mangeliidae
- Genus: Kurtziella
- Species: K. plumbea

Binomial name
- Kurtziella plumbea (Hinds, 1843)

Synonyms
- Clavatula plumbea Hinds, 1843; Kurtziella alesidota Dall, W.H., 1919; Mangilia (Kurtziella) alesidota Dall, W.H., 1919; Mangilia (Kurtziella) hebe Dall, 1919 junior subjective synonym; Mangilia (Kurtziella) tersa Dall, 1919 junior subjective synonym; Mangelia barbarensis Oldroyd 1924; Mangelia sulcata Carpenter, P.P., 1865; Mangilia oenoa Dall, W.H., 1919

= Kurtziella plumbea =

Species of gastropod

Kurtziella plumbea is a species of sea snail, a marine gastropod mollusk in the family Mangeliidae.

== Description ==
The length of the shell attains 10 mm, its diameter 3.5 mm.

The small shell is yellowish, with on the body whorl a faint dark band in front of the suture and an obscure dark line at the periphery, with a dark flush on the siphonal canal. The shell containssix whorls, including a minute smooth protoconch followed by a minutely reticulated second whorl, and then by the adult sculpture. The suture is distinct, slightly appressed, the anal fasciole occupying the space between it and an angular shoulder. The axial sculpture consists of (on the penultimate whorl, 15) narrow, sharp, arcuate ribs extending from the suture over the periphery, with wider interspaces. There are also minute incremental lines roughening the spirals. The spiral sculpture consists of numerous minutely channeled grooves with wider flattish interspaces (the latter sometimes with a smaller median groove) covering the whole surface. The aperture is narrow, with a wide very shallow anal sulcus. The outer lip is thin, sharp, body erased. The columella is straight, axis pervious, gyrate. The siphonal canal is hardly differentiated.

(Described as Mangilia (Kurtziella) hebe) The small, slender, acute shell is yellowish white. Its protoconch contains two smooth whorls, followed by five or six subsequent whorls. The spiral sculpture consists of fine equal uniform threads covering the whole whorl separated by narrow grooves and given a frosty appearance by fine sharp incremental lines. The axial sculpture consists of (on the body whorl eight or nine) narrow rounded ribs extended over the whole whorl with wider interspaces and somewhat constricted in front of the appressed suture. There is no evident anal fascicle apart from the constrictio. The aperture is narrow. The anal sulcus is hardly evident. The outer lip is sharp, moderately varicose, smooth inside, with the spiral sculpture showing through the thin shell. The inner lip is erased. The columella is straight. The siphonal canal is produced but is hardly differentiated.

== Distribution ==
This marine species occurs off California (San Diego) and Pacific Mexico.
