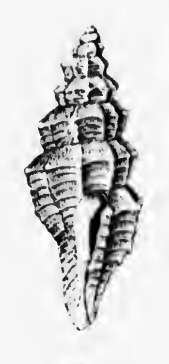
- Original image of a shell of Kurtzia arteaga

Scientific classification
- Kingdom: Animalia
- Phylum: Mollusca
- Class: Gastropoda
- Subclass: Caenogastropoda
- Order: Neogastropoda
- Superfamily: Conoidea
- Family: Mangeliidae
- Genus: Kurtzia
- Species: K. arteaga

Binomial name
- Kurtzia arteaga (Dall & Bartsch, 1910)

Synonyms
- Kurtzia gordoni Bartsch, 1944; Mangelia (Kurtziella) arteaga (Dall & Bartsch, 1910); Mangelia (Kurtziella) arteaga roperi Dall, 1919; Mangilia arteaga Dall & Bartsch, 1910 (original combination)

= Kurtzia arteaga =

Species of gastropod

Kurtzia arteaga is a species of sea snail, a marine gastropod mollusk in the family Mangeliidae.

== Description ==
The length of the shell attains 10.25 mm, its diameter 4 mm.

(Original description) The small shell has an acute-fusiform shape. It contains about eight whorls. The initial whorl is extremely minute, the subsequent whorls slowly enlarge and minutely reticulate. The later whorls have a strongly marked shoulder, and are, when young, of a reddish-brown colour, which gradually changes with exposure to a light grey. The sculpture of the adult whorls consists of (on the body whorl about ten) prominent, slightly arcuate, nearly axial ribs, rather sharply nodose at the intersection with the angle of the shoulder, with wider interspaces and continuous to the siphonal canal. As to the spiral sculpture of major and minor threads, there are about ten of the former in front of the shoulder, of which two are visible behind the suture on the spire; the remainder – which are much finer and minutely rugose – occupy the space of the whole surface, the major threads being slightly swollen where they cross the ribs. The aperture is narrow. The anal sinus is shallow and small. The columella and the throat are brownish, with a brown band under the suture. The outer lip is sharp between, and thickened at the varices. The siphonal canal is short. and wide. There is no operculum.

== Distribution ==
This species occurs in the Pacific Ocean off Vancouver Island, Canada, to San Diego, California, US.
