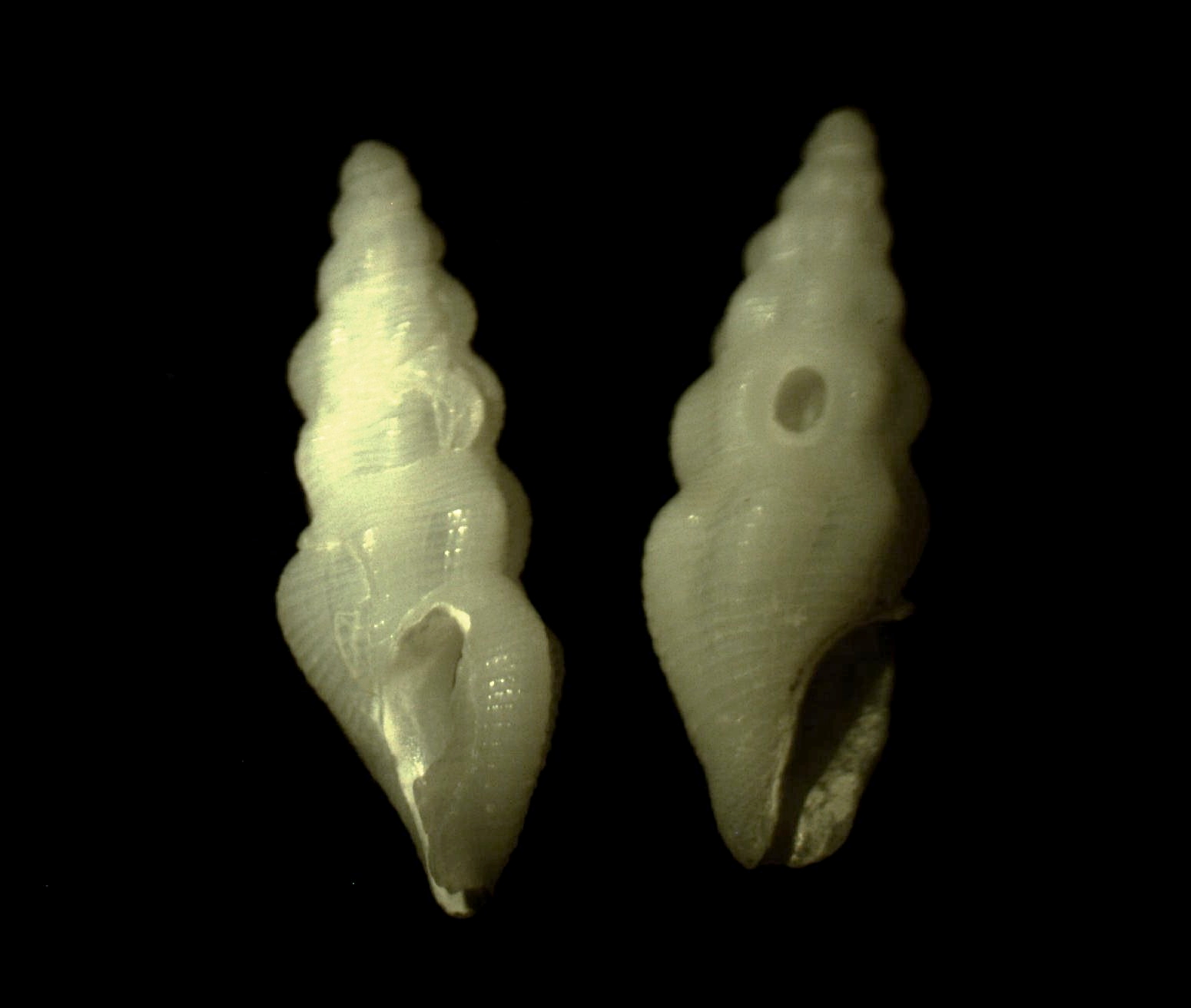
- Shell of Kurtziella perryae

Scientific classification
- Kingdom: Animalia
- Phylum: Mollusca
- Class: Gastropoda
- Subclass: Caenogastropoda
- Order: Neogastropoda
- Superfamily: Conoidea
- Family: Mangeliidae
- Genus: Kurtziella
- Species: K. perryae

Binomial name
- Kurtziella perryae Bartsch & Rehder, 1939

= Kurtziella perryae =

Species of gastropod

Kurtziella perryae is a species of very small predatory sea snail, a marine gastropod mollusk in the family Mangeliidae.

== Description ==
The length of the shell attains 7 mm.

== Distribution ==
K. perryae can be found in the Gulf of Mexico, ranging from the coast of Texas to western Florida.
