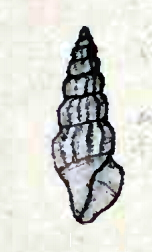
- Drawing of a shell of Kurtziella limonitella

Scientific classification
- Kingdom: Animalia
- Phylum: Mollusca
- Class: Gastropoda
- Subclass: Caenogastropoda
- Order: Neogastropoda
- Superfamily: Conoidea
- Family: Mangeliidae
- Genus: Kurtziella
- Species: K. limonitella

Binomial name
- Kurtziella limonitella (Dall, 1884)

Synonyms
- Drillia limonitella Dall, 1884; Mangilia limonitella (Dall, 1884)

= Kurtziella limonitella =

Species of gastropod

Kurtziella limonitella, common name the punctate mangelia, is a species of sea snail, a marine gastropod mollusk in the family Mangeliidae.

== Description ==
The length of the shell varies between 5 mm and 16 mm.

The shell has five whorls in the teleoconch, transverse ribs and a fine granulous or frosty spiral sculpture. Its color is whitish, lineated spirally with yellow brown and often with some brown on the outside of the siphonal canal or on the columella. K. limonitella has the spire but a trifle shorter than the body whorl. The whorls are rounded, and angulated behind the periphery. The shell shows twelve narrow riblets and has no varix. The notch is shallow, deepest near the angulation. The suture is hardly appressed or undulated. The siphonal canal does not differentiate from the aperture. The ribs are obsolete on the fasciole, or, if present, arched in harmony with the lines of growth.

The small, thin shell is translucent. It is lemon-yellow, very faintly narrowly brown-banded on the periphery and below it on some specimens, the columella also brown-tinged. The whorls are turreted, nodulated at the periphery by about a dozen ribs, which extend across the shoulder to the suture. The spiral sculpture is very fine and close. The outer lip is slightly thickened, with a distinct, rather broad, shallow sinus.

== Distribution ==
K. limonitella can be found in the Atlantic Ocean and the Gulf of Mexico, ranging from the North Carolina seaboard along the coast to Texas.

This species was also found as a fossil in Quaternary strata of the Caloosahatchee Formation near North St. Petersburg, Florida.
