= Acmaturris pelicanus =

Scientific classification
- Kingdom: Animalia
- Phylum: Mollusca
- Class: Gastropoda
- Subclass: Caenogastropoda
- Order: Neogastropoda
- Superfamily: Conoidea
- Family: Mangeliidae
- Genus: Acmaturris
- Species: A. pelicanus

Binomial name
- Acmaturris pelicanus Garcia, 2008

Species of gastropod

Acmaturris pelicanus is a species of sea snail, a marine gastropod mollusc in the family Mangeliidae.

== Description ==
The length of the shell attains 4 mm.

== Distribution ==
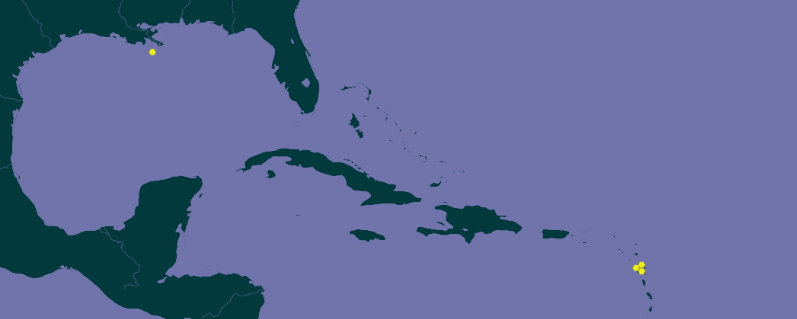
Distribution

This marine species occurs in the Gulf of Mexico off Louisiana, United States; in the Caribbean Sea off Aruba.
