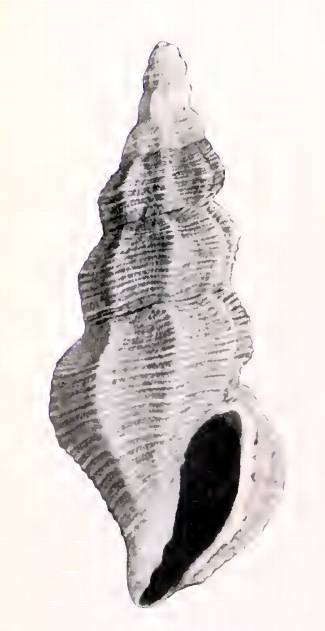
- Original image of a shell of Kurtzia aethra

Scientific classification
- Kingdom: Animalia
- Phylum: Mollusca
- Class: Gastropoda
- Subclass: Caenogastropoda
- Order: Neogastropoda
- Superfamily: Conoidea
- Family: Mangeliidae
- Genus: Kurtzia
- Species: K. aethra

Binomial name
- Kurtzia aethra (Dall, 1919)

Synonyms
- Philbertia aethra Dall, 1919

= Kurtzia aethra =

Species of gastropod

Kurtzia aethra is a species of sea snail, a marine gastropod mollusk in the family Mangeliidae.

== Description ==
The length of the shell attains 8 mm, its diameter 3.3 mm.

(Original description) The small, acute shell is pale brownish. Its smooth, acute protoconch consists of 2 whorls. The teleoconch consists of six subsequent whorls, the first of which has two peripheral spiral threads with an angle at the shoulder. There is other spiral sculpture of somewhat alternated small uniform close-set threads, made minutely scabrous by the intersection of sharp incremental lines and covering the whole surface. The; axial sculpture otherwise consists of six prominent sharp vertical ribs with much wider interspaces, practically continuous up the spire and extending from the suture to the siphonal canal. The aperture is narrow. The anal sulcus is shallow, rounded, not preceded by any obvious fasciole, close to the suture. The outer lip shows a thickened varix behind it, sharp edged without internal lirae. The inner lip is slightly erased. The narrow siphonal canal is short and distinct.

== Distribution ==
This species occurs in the Sea of Cortez, Western Mexico
