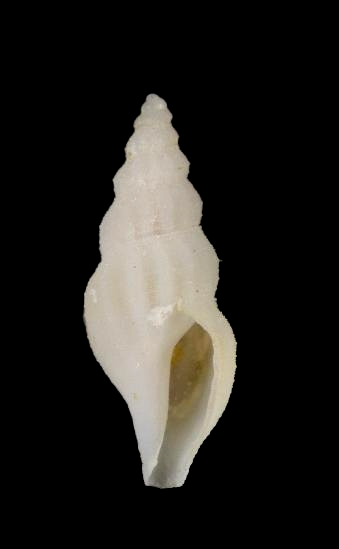
- Shell of Cryoturris fargoi (museum specimen at MNHN, Paris)

Scientific classification
- Kingdom: Animalia
- Phylum: Mollusca
- Class: Gastropoda
- Subclass: Caenogastropoda
- Order: Neogastropoda
- Superfamily: Conoidea
- Family: Mangeliidae
- Genus: Cryoturris
- Species: C. fargoi

Binomial name
- Cryoturris fargoi McGinty, 1955

= Cryoturris fargoi =

Species of gastropod

Cryoturris fargoi is a species of sea snail, a marine gastropod mollusk in the family Mangeliidae.

== Description ==
The length of the shell varies between 6 mm and 18 mm.

== Distribution ==
C. fargoi can be found in Atlantic Ocean waters, ranging from the coast of North Carolina south to Florida, the Bahamas, Colombia and Brazil. in the Caribbean Sea and the Gulf of Mexico.
