= Cryoturris adamsii =

Scientific classification
- Kingdom: Animalia
- Phylum: Mollusca
- Class: Gastropoda
- Subclass: Caenogastropoda
- Order: Neogastropoda
- Superfamily: Conoidea
- Family: Mangeliidae
- Genus: Cryoturris
- Species: C. adamsii

Binomial name
- Cryoturris adamsii (E. A. Smith, 1884)

Synonyms
- Pleurotoma adamsii Smith E. A., 1884

Species of gastropod

Cryoturris adamsii is a species of sea snail, a marine gastropod mollusk in the family Mangeliidae.

== Description ==
The length of the shell attains 7 mm.

== Distribution ==
C. adamsii can be found in Atlantic Ocean waters, the Gulf of Mexico and the Caribbean Sea, ranging from the coast of Texas south to Brazil.
