= Cryoturris edithae =

Scientific classification
- Kingdom: Animalia
- Phylum: Mollusca
- Class: Gastropoda
- Subclass: Caenogastropoda
- Order: Neogastropoda
- Superfamily: Conoidea
- Family: Mangeliidae
- Genus: Cryoturris
- Species: C. edithae

Binomial name
- Cryoturris edithae (Nowell-Usticke, 1971)

Synonyms
- Ithycythara edithae Nowell-Usticke, 1971

Species of gastropod

Cryoturris edithae is a species of sea snail, a marine gastropod mollusk in the family Mangeliidae.

== Description ==
The length of the shell attains 5.6 mm.

== Distribution ==
This marine species occurs in the Caribbean Sea off Venezuela and the Grenadines.
