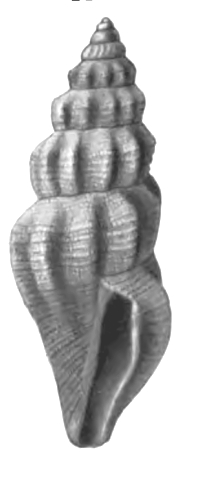
- Shell of † Cryoturris daidalea

Scientific classification
- Kingdom: Animalia
- Phylum: Mollusca
- Class: Gastropoda
- Subclass: Caenogastropoda
- Order: Neogastropoda
- Superfamily: Conoidea
- Family: Mangeliidae
- Genus: Cryoturris
- Species: C. daidalea

Binomial name
- Cryoturris daidalea J. Gardner, 1947

= Cryoturris daidalea =

Extinct species of gastropod

Cryoturris daidalea is an extinct species of sea snail, a marine gastropod mollusk in the family Mangeliidae.

== Description ==
The length of the shell attains 6 mm, its diameter 2.4 mm.

The shell is small and slender. The 3½ whorls of the highly polished protoconch have a distinct character. They have a costate sculpture with the axial sculpture developed only on the last half whorl. The last half whorl is carinate. The elevated spire is turreted with moderate inflated whorls that are constricted at the suture. The shell is spirally sculptured. The spirals are sharp and acutely granose and tend to alternate in size. The axial postnuclear sculpture originates near the end of the first half of the final whorl of the protoconch. The rather narrow axials are more or less obtuse, numbering 9 or 10 on the penultimate whorl. The somewhat oblique and oblanceolate aperture has about the same length as the maximum diameter of the shell. The outer lip is feebly arcuate.

== Distribution ==
This extinct marine species has been found in strata of Alum Bluff Group of Florida, United States
