= Rubellatoma rufocincta =

Scientific classification
- Kingdom: Animalia
- Phylum: Mollusca
- Class: Gastropoda
- Subclass: Caenogastropoda
- Order: Neogastropoda
- Superfamily: Conoidea
- Family: Mangeliidae
- Genus: Rubellatoma
- Species: R. rufocincta

Binomial name
- Rubellatoma rufocincta (Smith, E.A., 1882)

Synonyms
- Pleurotoma (Mangilia) rufocincta E. A. Smith, 1882

Species of gastropod

Rubellatoma rufocincta is a species of sea snail, a marine gastropod mollusk in the family Mangeliidae.

== Description ==
The length of the shell attains 8 mm, its diameter is 3 mm.

== Distribution ==
This marine species occurs in the Atlantic Ocean off Porto Cavalho, Brazil.
