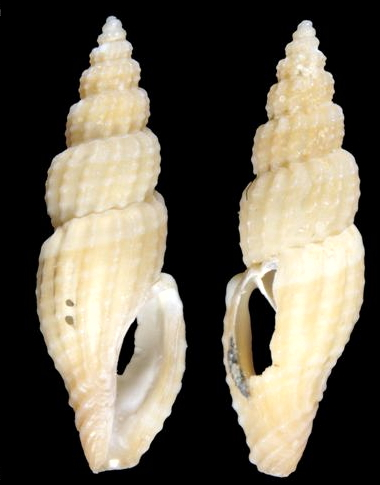
- Shell of Acmaturris ampla (holotype at the Natural History Museum of Los Angeles)

Scientific classification
- Kingdom: Animalia
- Phylum: Mollusca
- Class: Gastropoda
- Subclass: Caenogastropoda
- Order: Neogastropoda
- Superfamily: Conoidea
- Family: Mangeliidae
- Genus: Acmaturris
- Species: A. ampla

Binomial name
- Acmaturris ampla McLean & Poorman, 1971

= Acmaturris ampla =

Species of gastropod

Acmaturris ampla is a species of sea snail, a marine gastropod mollusk in the family Mangeliidae.

== Description ==
The length of the shell attains 8 mm.

== Distribution ==
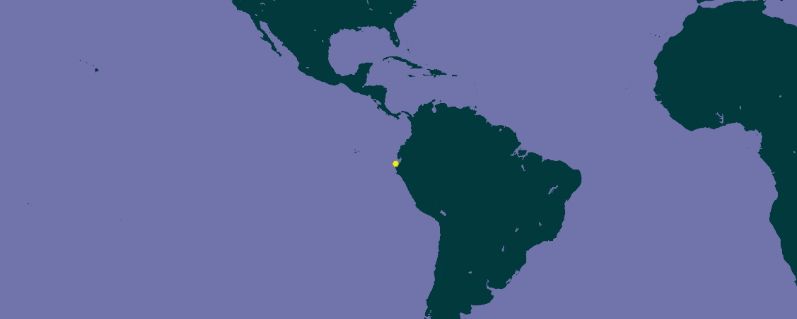
Distribution

This marine species occurs in the Pacific Ocean off Ecuador.
