= Kurtziella margaritifera =

Scientific classification
- Kingdom: Animalia
- Phylum: Mollusca
- Class: Gastropoda
- Subclass: Caenogastropoda
- Order: Neogastropoda
- Superfamily: Conoidea
- Family: Mangeliidae
- Genus: Kurtziella
- Species: K. margaritifera

Binomial name
- Kurtziella margaritifera W.G. Fargo in A.A. Olsson & A. Harbison, 1953

Species of gastropod

Kurtziella margaritifera, common name the pearl-studded mangelia, is a species of sea snail, a marine gastropod mollusk in the family Mangeliidae.

== Distribution ==
K. margaritifera can be found in the Gulf of Mexico, ranging from the eastern Florida seaboard along the coast to Louisiana.

It was also found as a fossil in Pliocene strata of North St. Petersburg, Florida.
