= Kurtziella powelli =

Scientific classification
- Kingdom: Animalia
- Phylum: Mollusca
- Class: Gastropoda
- Subclass: Caenogastropoda
- Order: Neogastropoda
- Superfamily: Conoidea
- Family: Mangeliidae
- Genus: Kurtziella
- Species: K. powelli

Binomial name
- Kurtziella powelli Shasky, 1971

Synonyms
- Kurtziella (Rubellatoma) powelli Shasky, 1971

Species of gastropod

Kurtziella powelli is a species of sea snail, a marine gastropod mollusk in the family Mangeliidae.

== Description ==
The length of the shell attains 5.1 mm, its diameter is 2 mm.

== Distribution ==
This marine species occurs off the Baja California, Mexico.
