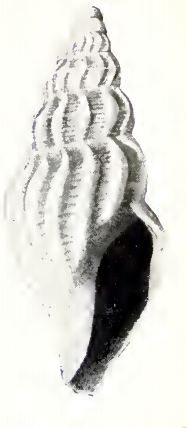
- Original image of a shell of Kurtziella newcombei

Scientific classification
- Kingdom: Animalia
- Phylum: Mollusca
- Class: Gastropoda
- Subclass: Caenogastropoda
- Order: Neogastropoda
- Superfamily: Conoidea
- Family: Mangeliidae
- Genus: Kurtziella
- Species: K. newcombei

Binomial name
- Kurtziella newcombei (Dall, W.H., 1919)

Synonyms
- Mangilia newcombei Dall, W.H., 1919

= Kurtziella newcombei =

Species of gastropod

Kurtziella newcombei is a species of sea snail, a marine gastropod mollusk in the family Mangeliidae.

== Description ==
The length of the shell attains 11 mm, its diameter 4 mm.

(Original description) The small shell is brownish, with a tendency to banding, paler at the shoulder and on the base. It contains six whorls, including a small, smooth protoconch whorl. The suture is distinct, slightly appressed, with no fasciolar constriction. The spiral sculpture consists of fine flattish threads separated by narrow striae very minutely reticulated by the incremental lines and most conspicuous in the intervals between the ribs, practically covering the whole surface of the shell. The axial sculpture, beside almost microscopic lines of growth, consists of (on the body whorl 14) short rounded ribs, slightly angulated at the shoulder and extending from the suture to the siphonal canal with subequal interspaces. The anal sulcus is shallow. The aperture is narrow and simple. The inner lip is erased. The siphonal canal is short, and straight.

== Distribution ==
This marine species occurs off Vancouver Island, Canada.
