= Bathyturris =

Scientific classification
- Missing taxonomy template (fix): Bathyturris

Type species
- Bathyturris aurolineata Fallon & Bouchet, 2026 (type by original designation)

Species
- See text

Genus of gastropods

Bathyturris is a genus of sea snails, marine gastropod mollusks in the family Mangeliidae.

== Species ==
- Bathyturris aurolineata Fallon & Bouchet, 2026
- Bathyturris bicarinata Fallon & Bouchet, 2026
- Bathyturris citronella (Dall, 1886)
- Bathyturris clausa Fallon & Bouchet, 2026
- Bathyturris corallina (R. B. Watson, 1881)
- Bathyturris deseada Fallon & Bouchet, 2026
- Bathyturris rhodostoma Fallon & Bouchet, 2026
- Bathyturris serga (Dall, 1881)
- Bathyturris solata Fallon, 2026
