= Kurtziella tachnodes =

Scientific classification
- Kingdom: Animalia
- Phylum: Mollusca
- Class: Gastropoda
- Subclass: Caenogastropoda
- Order: Neogastropoda
- Superfamily: Conoidea
- Family: Mangeliidae
- Genus: Kurtziella
- Species: K. tachnodes

Binomial name
- Kurtziella tachnodes (Dall, 1927)

Synonyms
- Mangilia tachnodes W.H. Dall, 1927

Species of gastropod

Kurtziella tachnodes, common name the wreath mangelia, is a species of sea snail, a marine gastropod mollusk in the family Mangeliidae.

== Description ==
The length of the shell attains 7.5 mm, its diameter 2.2 mm.

(Original description) The shell is small, slender, and lucid white. It features a very short whorl in the protoconch, followed by five and a half subsequent whorls. The suture is distinct and constricted, but not appressed, with a flattish fasciole in front. The fasciole's anterior edge is angular, forming a conspicuous shoulder on the whorls. The axial sculpture consists of threadlike ribs (around 25 on the body whorl), which are stronger on earlier whorls and have subequal interspaces. These ribs cross from suture to suture, become sharply nodulous at the shoulder, and are obsolete on the base. Incremental lines are inconspicuous. Spiral sculpture includes sharp threads (three on the spire, six or seven on the body whorl, alternating in strength), which are prominently nodulous where they override the ribs. The base and columella are smooth. The aperture is ovate, measuring about one-fourth of the total length, with a hardly differentiated siphonal canal and a very short columella. The outer lip is sharp, and the anal sulcus is wide and shallow.

== Distribution ==
K. tachnodes can be found in the Gulf of Mexico, off Florida; in the Atlantic Ocean off Georgia
