= Kurtzia elenensis =

Scientific classification
- Kingdom: Animalia
- Phylum: Mollusca
- Class: Gastropoda
- Subclass: Caenogastropoda
- Order: Neogastropoda
- Superfamily: Conoidea
- Family: Mangeliidae
- Genus: Kurtzia
- Species: K. elenensis

Binomial name
- Kurtzia elenensis McLean & Poorman, 1971

Species of gastropod

Kurtzia elenensis is a species of sea snail, a marine gastropod mollusk in the family Mangeliidae.

== Description ==
The length of the shell attains 4 mm.

== Distribution ==
This species occurs in the Pacific Ocean off Panama and Ecuador.
