= Kurtzia ephaedra =

Scientific classification
- Kingdom: Animalia
- Phylum: Mollusca
- Class: Gastropoda
- Subclass: Caenogastropoda
- Order: Neogastropoda
- Superfamily: Conoidea
- Family: Mangeliidae
- Genus: Kurtzia
- Species: K. ephaedra

Binomial name
- Kurtzia ephaedra (Dall, 1919)

Synonyms
- Philbertia ephaedra Dall, 1919

Species of gastropod

Kurtzia ephaedra is a species of sea snail, a marine gastropod mollusk in the family Mangeliidae.

== Description ==
The length of the shell attains 8.3 mm, its diameter 3.2 mm.

(Original description) The small, slender, acute shell is very pale brown or whitish. The apical whorl of the protoconch is minute, transparent, smooth, bubble-like, followed by 1½ faintly reticulate whorls. The 5½ subsequent whorls shows a deep appressed suture. The spiral sculpture consists of alternate threads with narrower interspaces, the major threads (on the spire two or three) rather prominent, especially the posterior one, which forms a sort of shoulder to the whorl, more conspicuous in the earlier whorls. The minor threads usually number one on the spire, but on the body whorl sometimes two or even three in the interspaces between the major threads. The threads are little or not at all swollen where they cross the ribs but are rendered harsh by the intersection of fine sharp close-set incremental lines. Other axial sculpture consists of (on the body whorl seven) prominent rounded ribs, crossing the whole whorl, with subequal interspaces, and practically continuous vertically up the spire. tTere is no obvious anal fasciole. The aperture is narrow. The anal sulcus is shallow and rounded, with no subsutural callus. The outer lip is subvaricose, moderately infolded, with a sharp edge and smooth inside. The inner lip is erased. The siphonal canal is short, wide, hardly recurved.

== Distribution ==
This species occurs in the Pacific Ocean off Panama.
