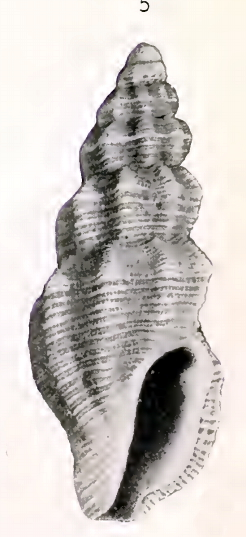
- Drawing of a shell of Kurtzia granulatissima

Scientific classification
- Kingdom: Animalia
- Phylum: Mollusca
- Class: Gastropoda
- Subclass: Caenogastropoda
- Order: Neogastropoda
- Superfamily: Conoidea
- Family: Mangeliidae
- Genus: Kurtzia; Bartsch, 1944

Type species
- Mangilia arteaga Dall & Bartsch, 1910

Species
- See text

= Kurtzia =

Genus of gastropods

Kurtzia is a genus of sea snails, marine gastropod mollusks in the family Mangeliidae.

Fossil species have been in Pliocene strata of Panama, Miocene strata in Central Chile and in Quaternary strata in California, USA

== Species ==
Species within the genus Kurtzia include:

- Kurtzia aethra (Dall, 1919)
- Kurtzia arteaga (Dall & Bartsch, 1910)
- Kurtzia atrostyla (Tryon, 1884)
- Kurtzia cedarkeysarum Fallon, 2026
- Kurtzia ceroplasta (K. J. Bush, 1885)
- Kurtzia delicata Fallon, 2026
- Kurtzia elenensis McLean & Poorman, 1971
- Kurtzia ephaedra (Dall, 1919)
- Kurtzia granulatissima (Moerch, 1860)
- Kurtzia herosae Fallon & Bouchet, 2026
- Kurtzia humboldti McLean & Poorman, 1971
- † Kurtzia kilburni C. Nielsen, 2003
- Kurtzia margaritifera (Fargo, 1953)
- Kurtzia sudamericana Fallon & Bouchet, 2026
- Kurtzia xalvisae Fallon, 2026

Species brought into synonymy

- Kurtzia aegialea W.H. Dall, 1919 : synonym of Kurtzia granulatissima (O.A.L. Mörch, 1860)
- Kurtzia gordoni Bartsch, 1944: synonym of Kurtzia arteaga (Dall & Bartsch, 1910)
