= Cryoturris dominicensis =

Scientific classification
- Kingdom: Animalia
- Phylum: Mollusca
- Class: Gastropoda
- Subclass: Caenogastropoda
- Order: Neogastropoda
- Superfamily: Conoidea
- Family: Mangeliidae
- Genus: Cryoturris
- Species: C. dominicensis

Binomial name
- Cryoturris dominicensis (W.M. Gabb, 1873 )

Synonyms
- † Kurtziella (Cryoturris) dominicensis (W.M. Gabb, 1873); † Turris (Bela) dominicensis W.M. Gabb, 1873; † Turris dominicensis W.M. Gabb, 1873

Extinct species of gastropod

Cryoturris dominicensis is an extinct species of sea snail, a marine gastropod mollusk in the family Mangeliidae.

== Distribution ==
This extinct marine species has been found in strata of Cercado Formation of Santo Domingo, Dominican Republic.
