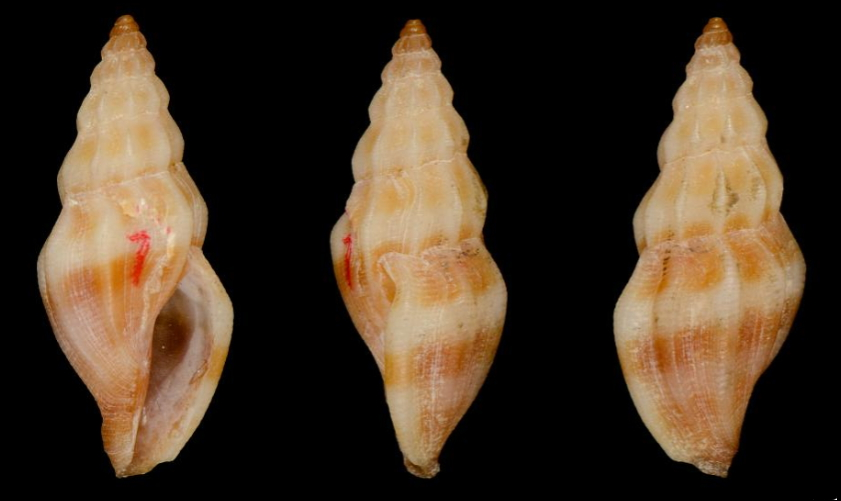
- Holotype

Scientific classification
- Kingdom: Animalia
- Phylum: Mollusca
- Class: Gastropoda
- Subclass: Caenogastropoda
- Order: Neogastropoda
- Superfamily: Conoidea
- Family: Mangeliidae
- Genus: Rubellatoma
- Species: R. diomedea

Binomial name
- Rubellatoma diomedea Bartsch & Rehder, 1939

Synonyms
- Kurtziella (Rubellatoma) diomedea (Bartsch & Rehder, 1939); Kurtziella diomedea (Bartsch & Rehder, 1939)

= Rubellatoma diomedea =

Species of gastropod

Rubellatoma diomedea, commonly named the red-brown mangelia, is a species of sea snail, a marine gastropod mollusk in the family Mangeliidae.

== Description ==
The size of the shell can attain 10 mm in length, and 4 mm in diameter.

== Distribution ==
R. diomedea can be found in the Gulf of Mexico, ranging from the coast of Texas to the Campeche Bank.
