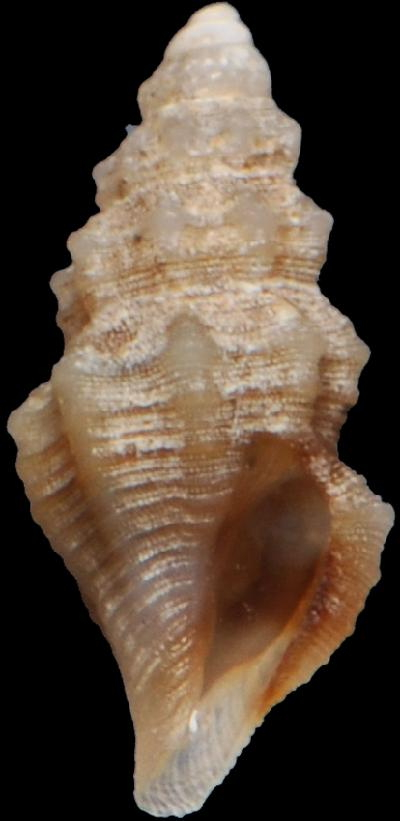
- Shell of Kurtzina venezuelana (museum specimen at MNHN, Paris)

Scientific classification
- Kingdom: Animalia
- Phylum: Mollusca
- Class: Gastropoda
- Subclass: Caenogastropoda
- Order: Neogastropoda
- Superfamily: Conoidea
- Family: Mangeliidae
- Genus: Kurtzina
- Species: K. venezuelana

Binomial name
- Kurtzina venezuelana Weisbord, 1962

Synonyms
- Kurtziella venezuelana Weisbord, 1962 superseded combination

= Kurtzina venezuelana =

Species of gastropod

Kurtzina venezuelana, common name the wreath mangelia, is a species of sea snail, a marine gastropod in the family Mangeliidae.

== Description ==
The length of the shell varies between 5 mm and 10 mm.

== Distribution ==
K. venezuelana can be found in the Gulf of Mexico, off Colombia and Venezuela.
