= Mangelia crebricostata =

Scientific classification
- Kingdom: Animalia
- Phylum: Mollusca
- Class: Gastropoda
- Subclass: Caenogastropoda
- Order: Neogastropoda
- Superfamily: Conoidea
- Family: Mangeliidae
- Genus: Mangelia
- Species: M. crebricostata

Binomial name
- Mangelia crebricostata Carpenter, 1864

Synonyms
- Daphnella crebricostata (Carpenter, 1864); Kurtziella crebricostata (Carpenter, 1864); Mangilia crebricostata (Carpenter, 1864); Oenopota crebricostata (Carpenter, 1864)

Species of gastropod

Mangelia crebricostata is a species of sea snail, a marine gastropod mollusk in the family Mangeliidae.

== Description ==
Compared with Oenopota aleutica (W.H. Dall, 1871), in Mangelia crebricostata the whorls are not so much angulated, the ribs pass from the suture to the lower end of the whorl, and the aperture is narrower and longer. The shell is also much more slender and smaller.

== Distribution ==
This marine species occurs from Forrester Island, Alaska, and Vancouver Island, Canada, to Monterey, California, United States.
