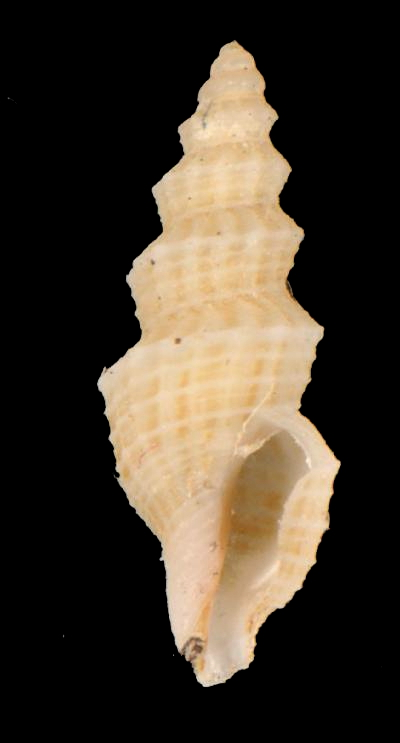
- Shell of Kurtziella serta (specimen at MNHN, Paris)

Scientific classification
- Kingdom: Animalia
- Phylum: Mollusca
- Class: Gastropoda
- Subclass: Caenogastropoda
- Order: Neogastropoda
- Superfamily: Conoidea
- Family: Mangeliidae
- Genus: Kurtziella
- Species: K. serta

Binomial name
- Kurtziella serta W.G. Fargo in A.A. Olsson & A. Harbison, 1953

Synonyms
- Cryoturris serta Fargo, 1953 superseded combination

= Kurtziella serta =

Species of gastropod

Kurtziella serta, common name the wreath mangelia, is a species of sea snail, a marine gastropod mollusk in the family Mangeliidae.

== Description ==
The length of the shell attains 10 mm.

== Distribution ==
K. serta can be found in the Gulf of Mexico, ranging from Panama to Southern Brazil; also off Martinique.

Fossils of this extinct marine species has been found in Pliocene strata of Florida, United States, and in Pliocene strata in Mexico.
