= Cryoturris dorvilliae =

- Shell of Cryoturris dorvilliae (specimen at MNHN, Paris)

Scientific classification
- Kingdom: Animalia
- Phylum: Mollusca
- Class: Gastropoda
- Subclass: Caenogastropoda
- Order: Neogastropoda
- Superfamily: Conoidea
- Family: Mangeliidae
- Genus: Cryoturris
- Species: C. dorvilliae

Binomial name
- Cryoturris dorvilliae (Reeve, 1845)

Synonyms
- Cryoturris quadrilineata (C. B. Adams, 1850); Defrancia quadrilineata (C. B. Adams, 1850); Kurtziella accinctus (Montagu, 1808); † Kurtziella caribbeana Weisbord, 1962 junior subjective synonym; Kurtziella dorvilliae (Reeve, 1845) superseded combination; Kurtziella quadrilineata (C. B. Adams, 1850); Kurtziella quadrilineata var. longa Nowell-Usticke, 1969 junior subjective synonym; Mangelia quadrilineata (C. B. Adams, 1850); Murex accinctus Montagu, 1808 (invalid: junior homonym of Murex accinctus Born, 1778); Pleurotoma dorvilliae Reeve, 1845 superseded combination; Pleurotoma forthiensis Reeve, 1845 junior subjective synonym; Pleurotoma quadrilineata C. B. Adams, 1850 junior subjective synonym

Species of gastropod

Cryoturris dorvilliae, common name Dorvill's mangelia, is a species of sea snail, a marine gastropod mollusk in the family Mangeliidae.

== Description ==
The length of the shell attains 10 mm.

The shell is slightly shouldered. It is longitudinally obliquely ribbed, very closely spirally striated. Its color is white, with sometimes an orange-brown band below the periphery.

(Description as Kurtziella dorvilliae) The length of the shell attains 10.5 mm.

The shell is rather thin and narrowly shouldered. It is longitudinally plicated, with fine revolving striae, more conspicuous towards the base. Its color is whitish, with a pale brown three-line zone.

== Distribution ==
This species occurs in Atlantic Ocean waters, ranging from the eastern coast of Florida south to Brazil.; in the Caribbean Sea (off Colombia), the Gulf of Mexico and the Lesser Antilles. This species was described by Montagu by error as British.
