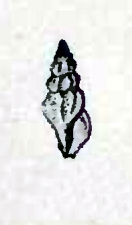
- Original image of a shell of Kurtzia atrostyla

Scientific classification
- Kingdom: Animalia
- Phylum: Mollusca
- Class: Gastropoda
- Subclass: Caenogastropoda
- Order: Neogastropoda
- Superfamily: Conoidea
- Family: Mangeliidae
- Genus: Kurtzia
- Species: K. atrostyla

Binomial name
- Kurtzia atrostyla (Tryon, 1884)

Synonyms
- Daphnella atrostyla Tryon, 1884; Daphnella cerina var. atrostyla Tryon, 1884 superseded combination; Kurtziella atrostyla (Tryon, 1884) superseded combination; Mangilia ephamilla Bush, K.J., 1885

= Kurtzia atrostyla =

Species of gastropod

Kurtzia atrostyla, common name the brown-tip mangelia, is a species of sea snail, a marine gastropod mollusk in the family Mangeliidae.

== Description ==
The length of the shell varies between 3 mm and 9 mm.

== Distribution ==
K. atrostyla can be found in the Atlantic Ocean, the Gulf of Mexico and the Caribbean Sea, ranging from the coast of North Carolina south to Quintana Roo.

It has also been as a fossil found in Quaternary strata in Louisiana, United States.
