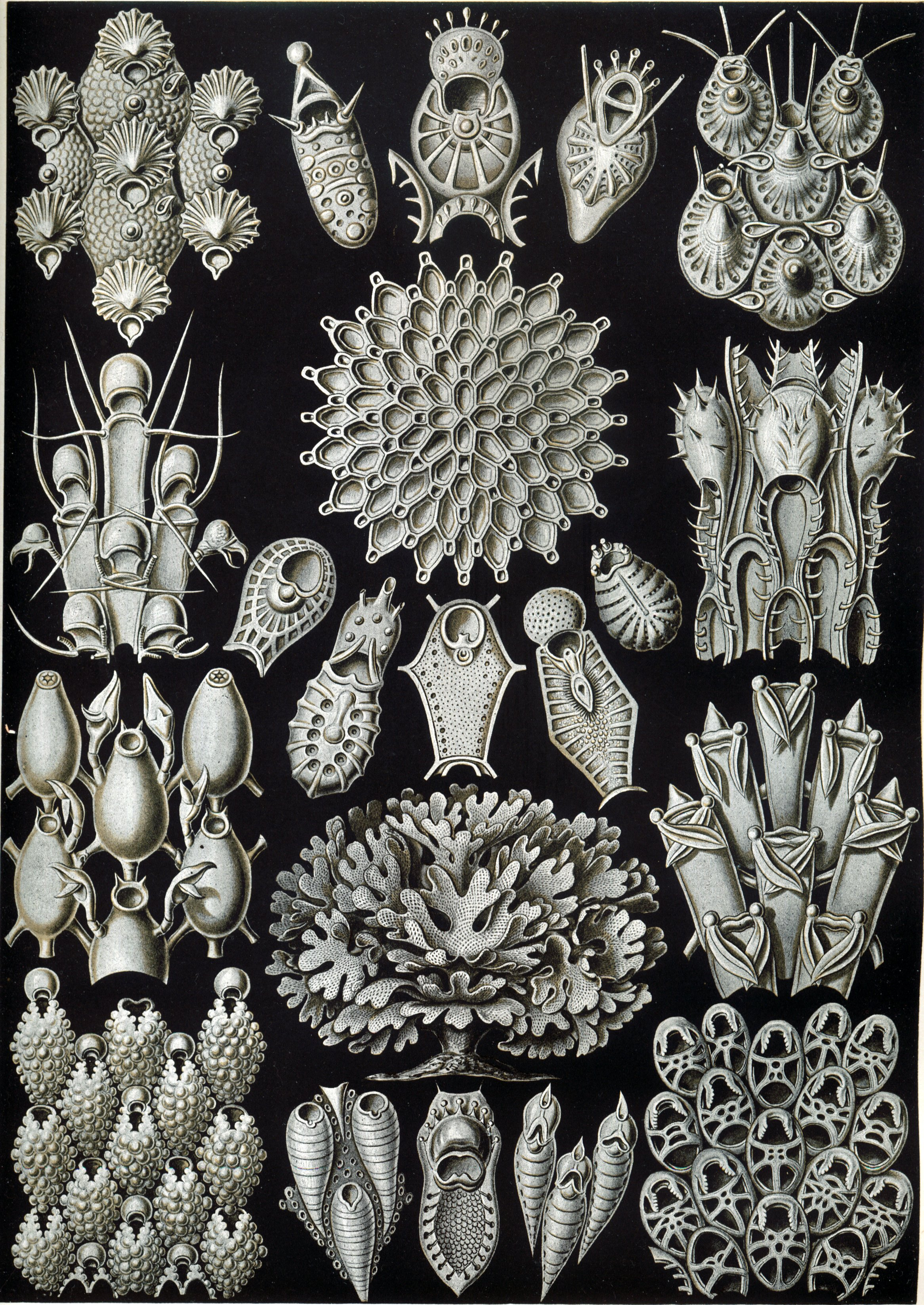
- 7 Cupularia stellata (Busk) = Cupuladria canariensis (Busk, 1859), skeleton of young colony

Scientific classification
- Kingdom: Animalia
- Phylum: Bryozoa
- Class: Gymnolaemata
- Order: Cheilostomatida
- Family: Cupuladriidae
- Genus: Cupuladria; Canu and Bassler 1919

Species
- Cupuladria canariensis (Busk, 1859); Cupuladria cheethami Herrera-Cubilla, Dick, Sanner & Jackson, 2006; Cupuladria doma (d'Orbigny, 1853); Cupuladria elegans Lu, 1991; Cupuladria exfragminis Herrera-Cubilla, Dick, Sanner & Jackson, 2006; Cupuladria guineensis (Busk 1854); Cupuladria incognita Herrera-Cubilla, Dick, Sanner & Jackson, 2006; Cupuladria monotrema (Busk, 1884); Cupuladria multesima Herrera-Cubilla, Dick, Sanner & Jackson, 2006; Cupuladria multispinata (Canu & Bassler 1923); Cupuladria pacificiensis Herrera-Cubilla, Dick, Sanner & Jackson, 2006; Cupuladria panamensis Herrera-Cubilla, Dick, Sanner & Jackson, 2006; Cupuladria remota Cook & Chimonides, 1994; Cupuladria surinamensis Cadée, 1975

= Cupuladria =

Cupuladria Temporal range: 56.0–0.0117 Ma

Genus of moss animals

Cupuladria is a genus of bryozoans in the suborder Flustrina.
