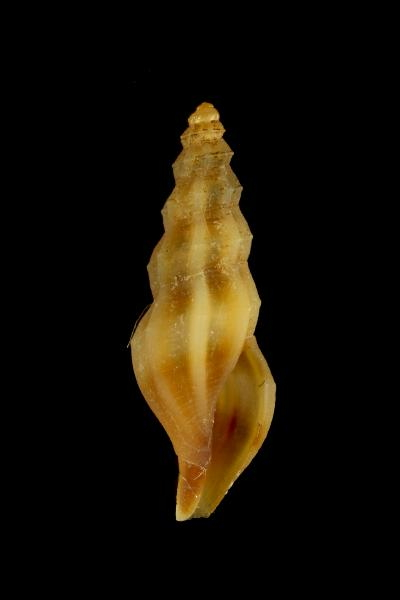
- Shell of Kurtziella antiochroa (specimen at MNHN, Paris)

Scientific classification
- Kingdom: Animalia
- Phylum: Mollusca
- Class: Gastropoda
- Subclass: Caenogastropoda
- Order: Neogastropoda
- Superfamily: Conoidea
- Family: Mangeliidae
- Genus: Kurtziella
- Species: K. antiochroa

Binomial name
- Kurtziella antiochroa (Pilsbry & Lowe, 1932)

Synonyms
- Kurtzina cymatia (Pilsbry, H.A. & H.N. Lowe, 1932); Mangelia antiochroa Pilsbry & Lowe, 1932; Mangelia cymatia Pilsbry & H. N. Lowe, 1932

= Kurtziella antiochroa =

Species of gastropod

Kurtziella antiochroa is a species of sea snail, a marine gastropod mollusk in the family Mangeliidae.

== Description ==
The length of the shell varies between 6 mm and 10 mm, its diameter is 3 mm.

== Distribution ==
This marine species occurs off Acapulco, Mexico and between Panama and Ecuador.
