= Kurtziella vincula =

Scientific classification
- Kingdom: Animalia
- Phylum: Mollusca
- Class: Gastropoda
- Subclass: Caenogastropoda
- Order: Neogastropoda
- Superfamily: Conoidea
- Family: Mangeliidae
- Genus: Kurtziella
- Species: K. vincula

Binomial name
- Kurtziella vincula (Nowell-Usticke, 1969)

Synonyms
- Cryoturris vincula (Nowell-Usticke, 1969)

Species of gastropod

Kurtziella vincula is a species of sea snail, a marine gastropod mollusk in the family Mangeliidae.

== Description ==
The length of the shell varies between 6 mm to 8.5 mm.

== Distribution ==
K. vincula can be found in Caribbean Sea waters, ranging from the western coast of Florida to the Lesser Antilles.
