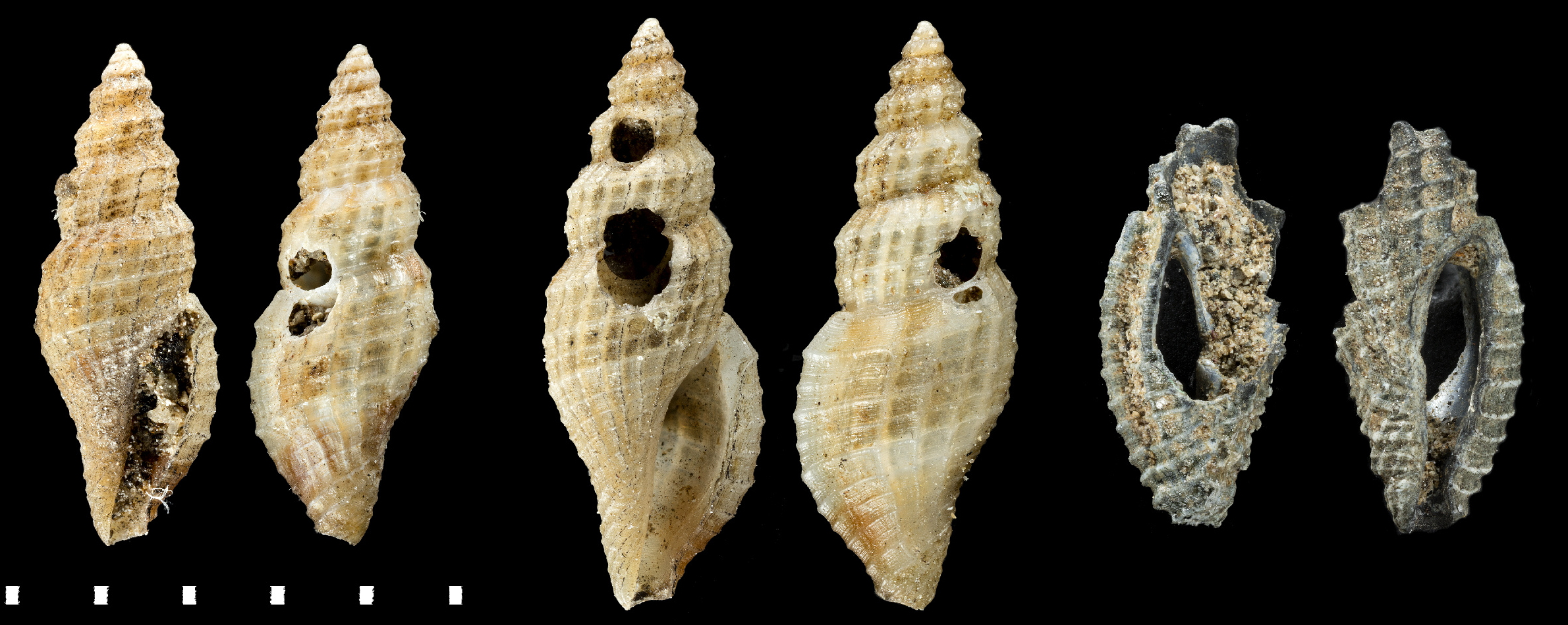
- Shell of Vitricythara lavalleana (specimen at the Natural History Museum, London)

Scientific classification
- Kingdom: Animalia
- Phylum: Mollusca
- Class: Gastropoda
- Subclass: Caenogastropoda
- Order: Neogastropoda
- Superfamily: Conoidea
- Family: Mangeliidae
- Genus: Vitricythara
- Species: V. lavalleana

Binomial name
- Vitricythara lavalleana (d'Orbigny, 1847)

Synonyms
- Cryoturris lavalleana (A. d'Orbigny, 1853) superseded combination; Pleurotoma lavalleana d'Orbigny, 1847 (original combination); Pyrgocythara lavalleana (d'Orbigny, 1847)

= Vitricythara lavalleana =

Species of gastropod

Vitricythara lavalleana is a species of sea snail, a marine gastropod mollusk in the family Mangeliidae.

== Description ==
The length of the shell can be as much as 7 mm (.276 inches).

== Distribution ==
Vitricythara lavalleana is native to the Caribbean Sea off Colombia, Cuba, Jamaica and Puerto Rico.
