= Rubellatoma rubella =

Scientific classification
- Kingdom: Animalia
- Phylum: Mollusca
- Class: Gastropoda
- Subclass: Caenogastropoda
- Order: Neogastropoda
- Superfamily: Conoidea
- Family: Mangeliidae
- Genus: Rubellatoma
- Species: R. rubella

Binomial name
- Rubellatoma rubella (Kurtz & Stimpson, 1851)

Synonyms
- Kurtziella rubella (Kurtz & Stimpson, 1851); Mangelia rubella Kurtz & Stimpson, 1851 (original combination)

Species of gastropod

Rubellatoma rubella, common name the reddish mangelia, is a species of sea snail, a marine gastropod mollusk in the family Mangeliidae.

== Description ==
The length of the shell varies between 6 mm and 11 mm.

== Distribution ==
R. rubella can be found in Atlantic waters, ranging from the coast of North Carolina south to Brazil.; in the Caribbean Sea and the Gulf of Mexico.
