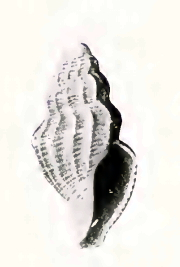
- Original image of a shell of Kurtzina beta

Scientific classification
- Kingdom: Animalia
- Phylum: Mollusca
- Class: Gastropoda
- Subclass: Caenogastropoda
- Order: Neogastropoda
- Superfamily: Conoidea
- Family: Mangeliidae
- Genus: Kurtzina
- Species: K. beta

Binomial name
- Kurtzina beta (Dall, 1919)

Synonyms
- Kurtziella beta (Dall, 1919); Mangilia (Kurtziella) beta Dall, 1919 (basionym); Mangilia beta Dall, 1919

= Kurtzina beta =

Species of gastropod

Kurtzina beta is a species of sea snail, a marine gastropod mollusk in the family Mangeliidae.

== Description ==
(Original description) The small shell is yellowish, with a short, pale siphonal canal. It has a blunt smooth protoconch of two whorls and 3½ subsequent whorls. The periphery is slightly behind the middle of the whorl. From the distinct suture the surface slopes flatly to the subangular periphery, the rest of the whorl is rounded. The spiral sculpture consists of uniform fine threads with narrower interspaces over the whole surface. The axial sculpture consists of (on the body whorl 15) narrow rather sharp ribs with much wider interspaces, obsolete behind the shoulder and on the base. There are also fine incremental lines which roughen the spiral threads. The anal fascicle is inconspicuous, the anal sulcus feeble. The aperture is simple. The outer lip is sharp. The axis is pervious. The columella is attenuated in front.

The species was described based on an immature specimen. The shell of this type specimen attained 5 mm in height and 2 mm in diameter.

== Distribution ==
This marine species occurs off Point Año Nuevo, in California.
