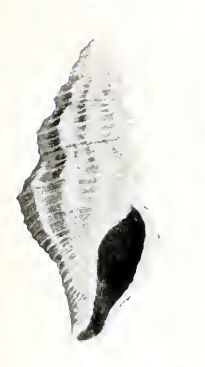
- Original image of a shell of Kurtzina cyrene

Scientific classification
- Kingdom: Animalia
- Phylum: Mollusca
- Class: Gastropoda
- Subclass: Caenogastropoda
- Order: Neogastropoda
- Superfamily: Conoidea
- Family: Mangeliidae
- Genus: Kurtzina
- Species: K. cyrene

Binomial name
- Kurtzina cyrene (Dall, 1919)

Synonyms
- Kurtziella cyrene (Dall, 1919); Mangilia (Kurtziella) cyrene Dall, 1919 (original combination)

= Kurtzina cyrene =

Species of gastropod

Kurtzina cyrene is a species of sea snail, a marine gastropod mollusk in the family Mangeliidae.

== Description ==
The length of the shell varies between 4.25 mm and 8.5 mm.

(Original description) The minute shell is waxen white. Its protoconch is very small, of 1½ smooth whorls, rapidly enlarging, followed by a minutely reticulated turn, of which the sculpture gradually merges into that of the adult type of four succeeding moderately rounded whorls separated by a distinct, not appressed suture. The spiral sculpture consists of a prominent sharp thread on the periphery slightly angulating it. Above this on the body whorl are two and below it on the base six or seven somewhat smaller threads with wider interspaces followed to the end of the siphonal canal by a more adjacent series of similar threads. The axial sculpture consists of (about 10 on the body whorl) rounded ribs extending from the suture over the base with much wider interspaces. The incremental lines are close-set, sharp, minutely raised, giving a frosted effect to the surface. The aperture is narrowly ovate. The outer lip is thin and sharp. The anal fasciole is feebly indicated. The inner lip and the columella are smooth. The siphonal canal is distinct, straight, short, and narrow.

== Distribution ==
This marine species occurs from the Sea of Cortez, Western Mexico, to Nicaragua
