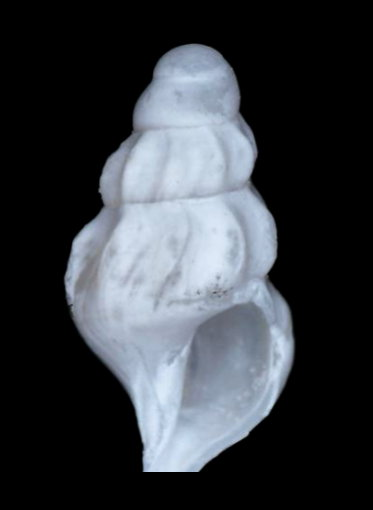
- Shell of Kurtziella cerina (specimen at the Smithsonian Institution)

Scientific classification
- Kingdom: Animalia
- Phylum: Mollusca
- Class: Gastropoda
- Subclass: Caenogastropoda
- Order: Neogastropoda
- Superfamily: Conoidea
- Family: Mangeliidae
- Genus: Kurtziella
- Species: K. cerina

Binomial name
- Kurtziella cerina (Kurtz & Stimpson, 1851)

Synonyms
- Daphnella cerina (Kurtz & Stimpson, 1851); Kurtziella cerinum [sic] (incorrect gender ending); Mangelia cerina (Kurtz & Stimpson, 1851); Mangilia cerina (Kurtz & Stimpson, 1851); Pleurotoma cerinum Kurtz & Stimpson, 1851 (original combination)

= Kurtziella cerina =

Species of gastropod

Kurtziella cerina is a species of small, predatory sea snail, a marine gastropod mollusk in the family Mangeliidae.

== Description ==
The length of the shell attains 10 mm.

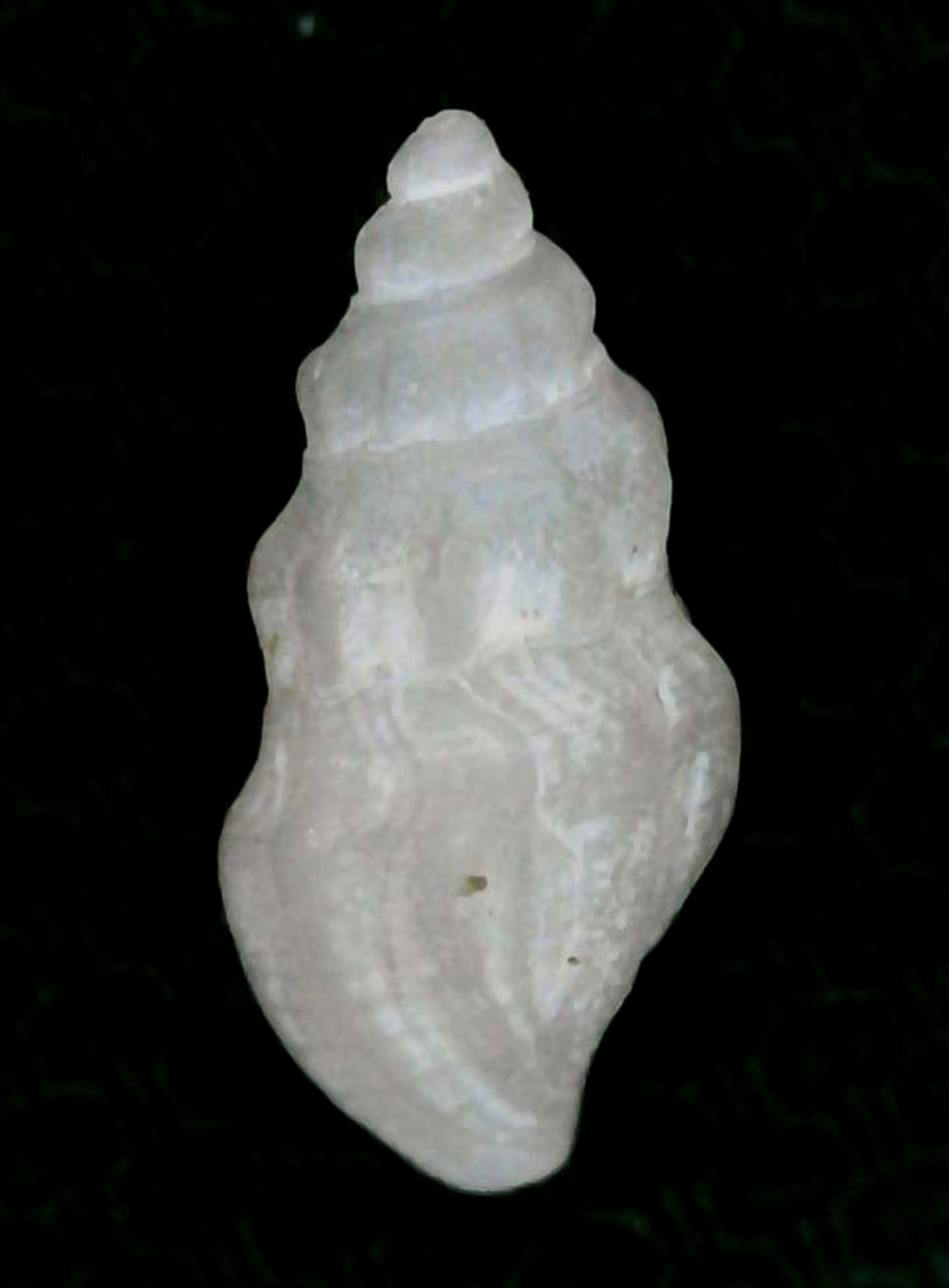
a specimen found in Wellfleet, MA

The shell is yellowish white; the columella is sometimes tinged with black. The surface is covered by very fine revolving lines crossing the ribs, producing a rasplike minor sculpture.

== Distribution ==
K. cerina can be found in Northwest Atlantic waters, ranging from the coast of Massachusetts to the Campeche Bank. and in the Gulf of Mexico and the Caribbean Sea.

It has also been found as a fossil in Quaternary strata in several states along the East Coast of the United States, United States.
