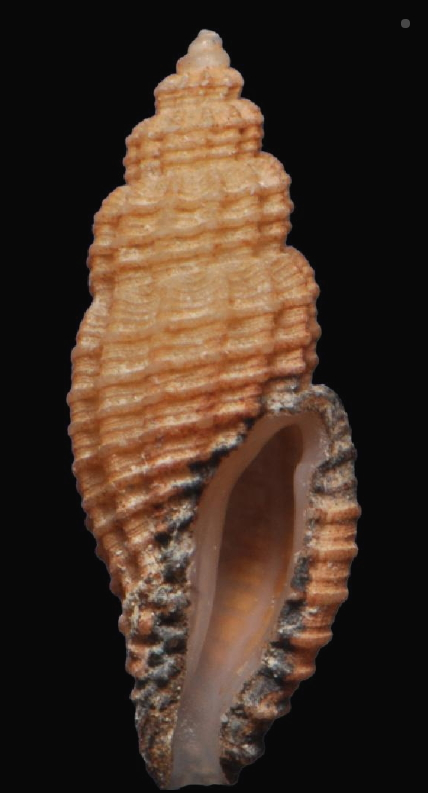
- Shell of Vitricythara metria (museum specimen at MNHN, Paris)

Scientific classification
- Kingdom: Animalia
- Phylum: Mollusca
- Class: Gastropoda
- Subclass: Caenogastropoda
- Order: Neogastropoda
- Superfamily: Conoidea
- Family: Mangeliidae
- Genus: Vitricythara
- Species: V. metria

Binomial name
- Vitricythara metria (Dall, 1903)

Synonyms
- Acmaturris metria (Dall, 1903); Agathotoma metria (Dall, 1903); Cythara metria Dall, 1903 (original combination); Cythara micromeris Dall, 1903; Pyrgocythara metria (Dall, 1903)

= Vitricythara metria =

Species of sea snail

Vitricythara metria is a species of small sea snail, a marine gastropod mollusk in the family Mangeliidae.

== Description ==
The shell of Vitricythara metria is small, with a length reaching approximately 5 mm and a width of about 2.2 mm. It has an elongated, biconical shape typical of the family Mangeliidae.

The shell is composed of about six whorls, including a smooth, glassy protoconch of about 1.5 whorls. The teleoconch whorls are moderately convex and feature a distinct sculpture consisting of about 10 to 12 prominent, slightly oblique axial ribs. These ribs are crossed by numerous fine, closely spaced spiral threads, which give the surface a finely decussated appearance under magnification. The aperture is narrow and elongated, protected by a moderately thick outer lip. The coloration is generally a translucent white to pale straw, sometimes with faint brownish bands or tinges near the suture.

== Taxonomy ==
The species was originally described by American malacologist William Healey Dall in 1903 as Cythara metria. Throughout the 20th century, it was reassigned to several genera, including Agathotoma and Pyrgocythara, before being placed in the genus Vitricythara based on its protoconch characteristics and shell aperture structure.

== Distribution ==
This marine species occurs in the Western Atlantic Ocean and the Caribbean Sea. Its range extends from:

- The United States (off the coast of North Carolina and Florida).
- The Gulf of Mexico and the Caribbean islands, including Guadeloupe.
- Southward to Colombia and French Guiana.

It is typically found in deep-water benthic environments, often associated with sandy or muddy substrates at depths between 30 and 150 meters.
