= Bathyturris citronella =

Scientific classification
- Kingdom: Animalia
- Phylum: Mollusca
- Class: Gastropoda
- Subclass: Caenogastropoda
- Order: Neogastropoda
- Superfamily: Conoidea
- Family: Mangeliidae
- Genus: Bathyturris
- Species: B. citronella

Binomial name
- Bathyturris citronella (Dall, 1886)

Synonyms
- Cryoturris citronella (Dall, 1886) superseded combination; Cryoturris cruzana Nowell-Usticke, 1969 junior subjective synonym; Kurtziella citronella (Dall, 1886); Pleurotoma (Mangilia) citronella Dall, 1886 superseded combination (original combination)

Species of gastropod

Bathyturris citronella, common name the yellow mangelia, is a species of sea snail, a marine gastropod mollusk in the family Mangeliidae.

== Description ==
(Described as Cryoturris citronella) This marine species has a very minute brown tilted protoconch, followed by three trochoid larval whorls. The brilliant yellow spire is markedly shorter than the body whorl, with inflated whorls. The shell contains twelve transverse riblets. There is no varix, and a very faint sutural notch, while the suture is distinct and not appressed. The four larval whorls are prettily marked with transverse concave ripples.
