= Cupuladriidae =

Scientific classification
- Kingdom: Animalia
- Phylum: Bryozoa
- Class: Gymnolaemata
- Order: Cheilostomatida
- Suborder: Flustrina
- Superfamily: Calloporoidea
- Family: Cupuladriidae; Lagaaij, 1952

Family of bryozoans

Cupuladriidae is a family of bryozoans belonging to the order Cheilostomatida.

== Genera ==
The following genera are recognised in the family Cupuladriidae:

- Biselenaria Gregory, 1893
- Cupuladria Canu & Bassler, 1919
- Discoporella d'Orbigny, 1852
- Reussirella Baluk & Radwanski, 1984
- Vibracellina Canu & Bassler, 1917
