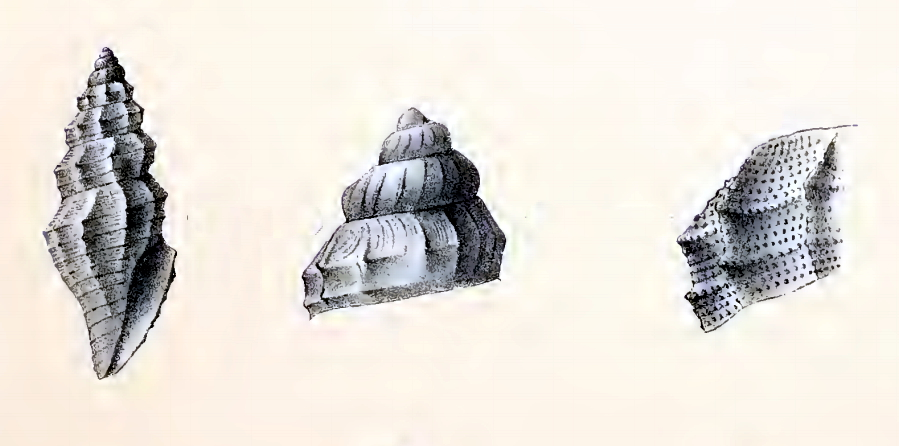
- Original image of a shell (and magnifications) of Bathyturris sergas

Scientific classification
- Kingdom: Animalia
- Phylum: Mollusca
- Class: Gastropoda
- Subclass: Caenogastropoda
- Order: Neogastropoda
- Superfamily: Conoidea
- Family: Mangeliidae
- Genus: Bathyturris
- Species: B. serga

Binomial name
- Bathyturris serga (Dall, 1881)

Synonyms
- Acmaturris vatovai F. Nordsieck, 1971 junior subjective synonym (synonym); Cryoturris serga (Dall, 1881) superseded combination; Kurtziella acanthodes (R. B. Watson, 1881) junior subjective synonym; Kurtziella corallina (R. B. Watson, 1881) junior subjective synonym; Kurtziella serga (Dall, 1881) superseded combination; Lyropleura talismani Locard, 1897 (unavailable name, introduced in synonymy and never used as valid); Mangelia serga (Dall, 1881) superseded combination; Mangilia serga (Dall, 1881) superseded combination; Mangilia serga var. elongata Locard, 1897; Pleurotoma (Drillia) serga Dall, 1881 superseded combination; Pleurotoma (Mangelia) acanthodes R. B. Watson, 1881 junior subjective synonym; Pleurotoma corallina R. B. Watson, 1881 junior subjective synonym; Raphitoma nuperrima var. corallinoides Sturany, 1896; Raphitoma nuperrima var. pseudoacanthodes Sturany, 1896

= Bathyturris serga =

Species of gastropod

Bathyturris serga is a species of sea snail, a marine gastropod mollusk in the family Mangeliidae.

This species was considered by Tucker as a synonym of Kurtziella serga (Dall, W.H., 1881)

== Description ==
(Original description as Kurtziella acanthodes) Shell.— The high and narrow shell has a biconical shape and is ribbed and spiralled. Its colour is a frosted-white,. The spire is subscalar, blunt but small-pointed. It has a small body whorl and aperture, and a rather contracted base.

Sculpture: Longitudinals—on the body whorl there are 14, on the penultimate whorl 10, and on the first regular whorl 9 ribs. They arise very feebly at the suture, gain height in the sinus-area, and add on a little breadth below. They are high, narrow, and rounded toward the aperture they are crowded, but in general they are parted by rounded furrows of two or three times their width. They extend to the extreme point of the base, but not to the snout. The whole surface is likewise fretted with minute sharp lines of growth. Spirals—on the embryonic whorls there is one, on the other whorls two, fine spiral threads. The upper and stronger lies below the sinus-area about one-third down the whorl, and forms, with help of an angulation at that point, a rather sharp keel, rising into small sharp tubercles at the intersections of the ribs. Between this keel and the root of the snout there are on the body whorl six weaker threads, which all rise into tubercles as they cross the ribs. On the snout are three or four weaker threads without tubercles. The interstices of these spirals are from twice to four times their width. The whole surface of the shell, except the embryonic whorls, is scored with very fine, sharp, close-set spirals, which, at crossing the lines of growth, are beset with microscopic blunt prickles which give the frosted aspect to the shell.

The colour of the shell is white, only the tip is smooth.

The spire is conical, scalar, in consequence of the drooping projecting shoulder at the top of each whorl. The protoconch consists of 3½ embryonic whorls, which are conically globose, smooth, keeled, closely, roundedly ribbed, with a deepish suture, and rise to a minute point (crushed). The whorls number 8½ in all, a little bunchy and disorderly. They have a long slightly drooping shoulder defined by the keel, below which they are cylindrical, with a slight contraction into the lower suture. The body whorl is small, with a contracting scarcely convex base, prolonged into a small, but distinct, and somewhat cylindrical snout. The suture is small, slightly impressed. The aperture is small, narrow, slightly pear-shaped, oblique, triangular above, prolonged into the small siphonal canal below. The outer lip is flat at the shoulder, angulated at the keel, slightly convex below this. The edge projects thinly beyond the last longitudinal rib, which serves as a varix . It presents a flattened, but regular curve from the point of the shell to the keel, where the edge forms a little shoulder, between which and the body lies the narrow round small sinus, with its flanged border. The inner lip is straight, with a very thin narrow glaze which early runs out to the rim, being cut off by the slightly oblique and twisted edge, which continues with a slight patulous margin to the point of the shell.

(Described as Kurtziella serga) The small, dull, slender shell is yellowish white. It contains 8 whorls. The protoconch is small, translucent and shining. It passes into the sculpture of the adult gradually, in 2½ nuclear whorls, which show first minute transverse wrinkles on the periphery of the second whorl. The succeeding whorls are transversely sculptured by eight to twelve slightly oblique angular riblets, which pass entirely over the whorls, and only become obsolete on the siphonal canal. These are crossed, first by (on the upper whorls) two or (on the body whorl) nine rounded threads which rise to sharp points on reaching the summits of the riblets, and are perfectly distinct in the interspaces. Secondly, by finer intercalary revolving threads, which pass without change over the riblets, usually to the number of three or four between each pair of primary threads. These also cover the notch-band, and over them, as well as the primaries, the lines of growth are raised in microscopic granules, or lamella, which, under strong magnification, give a very peculiar scabrous appearance to the surface. The strongest primary riblet is the one just in advance of the somewhat steeply declining and poorly defined notchband. The aperture is narrow. The anal sinus is deep. The outer lip is thin, produced and probably thickened in the perfectly mature adult. The columella and body whorl show no callus. The columella is straight. The suture is appressed. The siphonal canal is slightly recurved.

(Described as Kurtziella corallina) Shell.— High, narrow, with squarish lines. It has a biconical shape. It is ribbed and spiralled. It is of a frosted white colour and coral-like texture. The shell showe a scalar, blunt, but small-pointed spire, a smallish body whorl, a conical base, and a small, undefined snout.

Sculpture : Longitudinals— there are about 13 ribs on each whorl. But they do not all exactly answer from whorl to whorl. They rise feebly just at the suture, but quickly increase in height, more slowly in breadth. In the sinus-area they are curved. From the shoulder they are straight, with only a slight curve on the base. They die out on the snout. They are narrow and rounded, and are parted by rounded furrows of three times their breadth. The whole surface is also fretted with sharp minute lines of growth. Spirals—there is a straight, slightly drooping shoulder below the suture. This ends above the middle of the whorl in a distinct angulation defined by a fine thread, which rises into small, sharp, rounded tubercles as it crosses the ribs. On the penultimate whorl a finer thread begins to appear in the inferior suture, but gradually rises above it. It is from this lower spiral that the contraction of the base begins: on the base are 3 or 4 finer spirals parted by spaces about four times their width. These are then followed by several weaker crowded spirals, then one stronger and more prominent : all these rise into small tubercles on crossing the ribs: beyond the end of the ribs, on the snout, are some 6 fine distinct threads. The whole surface between these is closely covered with very fine spiral threads, which on all the longitudinal lines of growth are beset with most orderly and regular microscopic blunt prickles, which give the coralline aspect to the surface.

The colour of the shell is white. The tip alone is smooth.

The spire is conical and scalar. The protoconch consists of 4 embryonic whorls, which are bluntly conical, depressed, rounded, ribbed, with a distinct suture, and rise to a minute tip (crushed). The shell contains 8 whorls in all, broad and short, of regular increase, sharply keeled at the shoulder-spiral, and from this very slightly contracted, but altogether angular, not curved. The body whorl is small, but attenuated, not constricted, is scarcely convex on the base, and is produced into a short, vaguely defined, and very obliquely pointed snout. The suture is very slight, but defined by the angulation at which the whorls meet. The aperture is small, narrow, slightly pear-shaped, very little oblique, bluntly triangular above, and prolonged into the short, open, scarcely narrowed siphonal canal below. The outer lip is flat at the shoulder, angulated at the keel, scarcely convex below this. The edge projects as a thin sharp lamina beyond the last longitudinal rib, which serves as a varix from the point of the shell to the keel. The edge is hardly convex, and scarcely forms a shoulder above. The sinus is merely a small rounded hollow. The inner lip shows a glaze that is exceptionally narrow and short. The curve of the lip is a very little concave at the base of the columella, which is rather longer and narrower than one would expect, and which is cut off in front with a long, slightly oblique, bluntly rounded, twisted edge.

It is extremely alike with Kurtziella acanthodes. However, it has a relatively shorter, broader, and squarer outline and ribbing.

== Distribution ==
This species occurs in Atlantic Ocean waters, ranging from the coast of North Carolina south to the Virgin Islands; in the Caribbean Sea off Cuba and Saint Thomas and the Virgin Islands in the Gulf of Mexico, the Caribbean Sea and the Lesser Antilles.

Fossils of Kurtziella serga have been found in Quaternary strata of Louisiana, United States.
