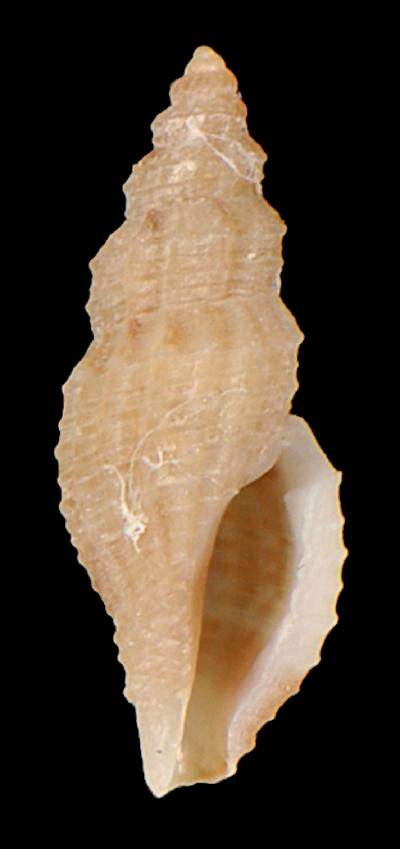
- Shell of Platycythara elata (museum specimen at MNHN, Paris)

Scientific classification
- Kingdom: Animalia
- Phylum: Mollusca
- Class: Gastropoda
- Subclass: Caenogastropoda
- Order: Neogastropoda
- Superfamily: Conoidea
- Family: Mangeliidae
- Genus: Platycythara
- Species: P. elata

Binomial name
- Platycythara elata (Dall, 1889)

Synonyms
- Cryoturris elata (Dall, 1889); Mangilia (Daphnella) elata Dall, 1889 (basionym); Rubellatoma elata (Dall, 1889); Vitricythara elata (Dall, 1889)

= Platycythara elata =

Species of gastropod

Platycythara elata, common name the elongate mangelia, is a species of sea snail, a marine gastropod mollusk in the family Mangeliidae.

== Description ==
The length of the shell attains 4.75 mm, its diameter 2 mm.

(Original description) The small, elongated, narrow shell is translucent white with streaks and lines of dark brown or yellow. The first whorl of the protoconch is minute, tilted glassy. The subsequent whorls are translucent, smooth, or with oblique transverse sculpture which almost imperceptibly passes into the ribbing of the adult. In all there are seven whorls including the protoconch. The early ones are rounded, and soon take on an angulation just in front of the fasciole. The spiral sculpture consists of three or four fine threads on the fasciole, and three or four stronger threads between the fasciole and the suture in front. On the body whorl there are fifteen or twenty of these between the shoulder of the whorl and the front end of the siphonal canal. They are not perfectly uniform in size, and between them are frequently much finer lines. These cross about (on the body whorl) fifteen transverse rounded riblets, which extend from near the suture forward to the siphonal canal. The body whorl is rather compressed. The aperture is elongated and narrow. The outer lip is angulated at the shoulder, with a broad shallow rounded anal notch, thin edge, and smooth interior. The inner lip is nearly straight, anteriorly a little oblique. The siphonal canal is short, hardly differentiated and not recurved.

== Distribution ==
This species occurs in the Atlantic Ocean off North Carolina to West Florida, United States; in the Antilles off Martinique and Guadeloupe.
