= Bowden Formation =

Geologic formation located in Jamaica

- Stratigraphic range: Neogene
- Type: Formation

Location
- Country: Jamaica

The Bowden Formation is a geologic formation in Jamaica. It preserves fossils dating back to the Neogene period.

== Fossil content ==
Color key: Taxon / Reclassified taxon / Taxon falsely reported as present / Dubious taxon or junior synonym / Ichnotaxon / Ootaxon / Morphotaxon	Notes; Uncertain or tentative taxa are in small text; ~~crossed out~~ taxa are discredited.

=== Fish ===
Fishes from the Bowden Formation
Genus	Species	Location	Member	Material	Notes	Images
Cataetyx	C. stringeri				An viviparous brotula	
Diaphus	D. aequalis				An lanternfish	
Diaphus	D. depressifrons				An lanternfish	
Diaphus	D. paxtoni				An lanternfish	
Ophidion	O. bowdenensis				An cusk-eel	

=== Bryozoans ===
Bryozoans from the Bowden Formation
Genus	Species	Location	Member	Material	Notes	Images
Cupuladria	C. collyrida				A cupuladriid cheilostomatidan	

=== Cnidarians ===
Cnidarians from the Bowden Formation
Genus	Species	Location	Member	Material	Notes	Images
Antillia	A. coatesi				A mussine mussid	

== See also ==
- List of fossiliferous stratigraphic units in Jamaica
