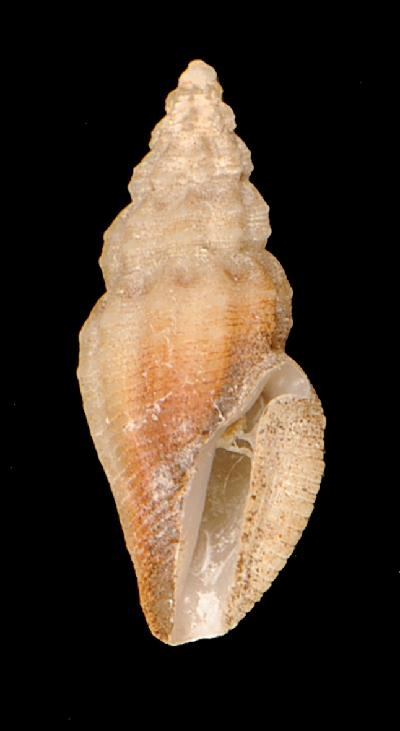
- Shell of Tenaturris sp.; museum specimen at MNHN, Paris

Scientific classification
- Kingdom: Animalia
- Phylum: Mollusca
- Class: Gastropoda
- Subclass: Caenogastropoda
- Order: Neogastropoda
- Superfamily: Conoidea
- Family: Mangeliidae
- Genus: Tenaturris; Woodring, 1928

Species
- See text

= Tenaturris =

Genus of gastropods

Tenaturris is a genus of sea snails, marine gastropod mollusks in the family Mangeliidae.

== Description ==
(Original description) The stout shell is medium-sized. The protoconch is conical, consisting of two and a half whorls, about the last one sculptured with axial riblets. (One species referred to this genus has a stout, cylindrical, smooth nucleus of two whorls.)

The aperture is long and moderately narrow. The anterior canal is short, barely emarginate. The outer lip is varicose. The anal notch immediately adjoining the suture is moderately deep and broadly rounded. The interior of the outer lip bears a low, broad denticle on the notch. The parietal callus is thin. The sculpture consists of axial ribs, which may be varicose here and there on the body whorl, and spiral threads, with microscopic frosted spirals in the interspaces.

== Species ==
Species within the genus Tenaturris include:

- Tenaturris bartlettii (Dall, 1889)
- Tenaturris concinna (Adams C. B., 1852)
- Tenaturris decora (Smith E. A., 1882)
- Tenaturris dysoni (Reeve, 1846)
- Tenaturris epomis (Dall, 1927)
- Tenaturris fulgens (Smith E. A., 1888)
- Tenaturris gemma (Smith E. A., 1884)
- † Tenaturris guppyi (W.H. Dall, 1896)
- Tenaturris inepta (E. A. Smith, 1882)
- † Tenaturris isiola W.P. Woodring, 1928
- Tenaturris janira (Dall, 1919)
- Tenaturris merita (Hinds, 1843)
- Tenaturris multilineata (C. B. Adams, 1845)
- † Tenaturris terpna W.P. Woodring, 1928
- Tenaturris trilineata (C. B. Adams, 1845)
- Tenaturris verdensis (Dall, 1919)

Species brought into synonymy

- Tenaturris burchi Hertlein, L.G. & A.M. Strong, 1951: synonym of Tenaturris verdensis (Dall, 1919)
- Tenaturris dubia (C. B. Adams, 1845): synonym of Pyrgocythara dubia (C. B. Adams, 1845):
- Tenaturris fusca (Adams C. B., 1845): synonym of Pyrgocythara cinctella (Pfeiffer, 1840)
- Tenaturris helenensis E.A. Smith, 1884: synonym of Tenaturris gemma (E.A. Smith, 1884)
- Tenaturris nereis Pilsbry, H.A. & H.N. Lowe, 1932: synonym of Tenaturris merita (Hinds, 1843)
- Tenaturris phaethusa (Dall, 1919): synonym of Notocytharella phaethusa (Dall, 1919)
- Tenaturris trifasciata L.A. Reeve, 1845: synonym of Tenaturris trilineata (C.B. Adams, 1845)
