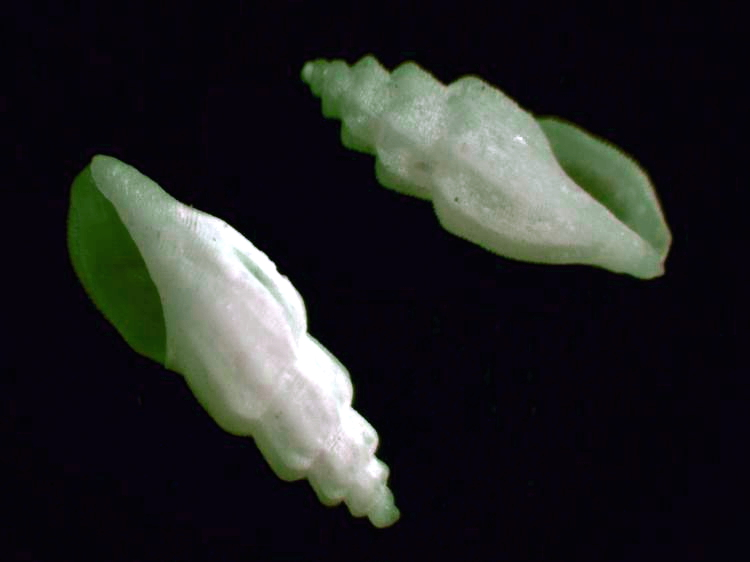
- Shells of Pyrgocythara densestriata

Scientific classification
- Kingdom: Animalia
- Phylum: Mollusca
- Class: Gastropoda
- Subclass: Caenogastropoda
- Order: Neogastropoda
- Superfamily: Conoidea
- Family: Mangeliidae
- Genus: Pyrgocythara; Woodring, 1928

Species
- See text

= Pyrgocythara =

Genus of gastropods

Pyrgocythara is a genus of sea snails, marine gastropod mollusks in the family Mangeliidae.

The type species is the Pliocene: Pyrgocythara eminula Woodring, 1928, which is probably the same as the Recent Pleurotoma trilineata C.B. Adams, 1845 (synonym of Cryoturris trilineata (C. B. Adams, 1845))

== Distribution ==
This genus occurs in the Western Atlantic Ocean, the Caribbean Sea and the Gulf of Mexico.

== Species ==
Species within the genus Pyrgocythara include:

- Pyrgocythara albovittata (Adams C. B., 1845)
- Pyrgocythara angulosa McLean & Poorman, 1971
- Pyrgocythara annaclaireleeae (García, 2008)
- Pyrgocythara astricta (L.A. Reeve, 1846) (nomen dubium)
- Pyrgocythara cinctella (Pfeiffer, 1840)
- Pyrgocythara crassicostata (C. B. Adams, 1850)
- Pyrgocythara danae (Dall, 1919)
- Pyrgocythara densestriata (Adams C. B., 1850)
- Pyrgocythara dubia (Adams C. B., 1845)
- Pyrgocythara elata (Dall, 1889)
- Pyrgocythara emersoni Shasky, 1971
- Pyrgocythara emeryi Fargo, 1953
- † Pyrgocythara eminula Woodring, 1928
- Pyrgocythara fenestrata Fallon & Bouchet, 2026
- Pyrgocythara filosa Rehder, 1943
- Pyrgocythara fuscoligata (Carpenter, 1856)
- Pyrgocythara guarani (Orbigny, 1841)
- Pyrgocythara hamata (Carpenter, 1865)
- Pyrgocythara helena (Dall, 1919)
- Pyrgocythara hemphilli Bartsch & Rehder, 1939
- Pyrgocythara juliocesari Fernández-Garcés & Rolán, 2010
- Pyrgocythara laqueata (Reeve, 1846) (taxon inquirendum)
- Pyrgocythara mairelae Fernández-Garcés & Rolán, 2010
- Pyrgocythara melita (Dall, 1919)
- Pyrgocythara mighelsi (Kay, 1979)
- Pyrgocythara nodulosa Sysoev & Ivanov, 1985
- Pyrgocythara plicosa (C. B. Adams, 1850)
- Pyrgocythara scammoni (Dall, 1919)
- Pyrgocythara subdiaphana (Carpenter, 1864)
- Pyrgocythara subtilis (R. B. Watson, 1881) (accepted > unreplaced junior homonym, junior homonym of Pleurotoma subtilis M. Hörnes, 1854)
- Pyrgocythara trilineata (C. B. Adams, 1845)
- † Pyrgocythara turrispiralata Scarponi, Daniele, et al., 2015
- Pyrgocythara urceolata Rolán & Otero-Schmitt, 1999
- Pyrgocythara vicina (C. B. Adams, 1850)

Species brought into synonymy

- Pyrgocythara arbela W.H. Dall, 1919: synonym of Pyrgocythara hemphilli P. Bartsch & H.A. Rehder, 1939
- Pyrgocythara balteata (Reeve, 1846): synonym of Ithycythara lanceolata (C. B. Adams, 1850) (nomen dubium)
- Pyrgocythara brunnea B.F. Perkins, 1869: synonym of Pyrgocythara plicosa (Adams, 1850)
- Pyrgocythara candidissima (Adams C. B., 1845): synonym of Agathotoma candidissima (C. B. Adams, 1845)
- Pyrgocythara caribaea (Orbigny, 1842): synonym of Pyrgocythara cinctella (Pfeiffer, 1840)
- Pyrgocythara cerea P.P. Carpenter, 1865: synonym of Pyrgocythara hamata (P.P. Carpenter, 1865)
- Pyrgocythara coxi Fargo, 1953: synonym of Agathotoma coxi (Fargo, 1953)
- Pyrgocythara fusca (C. B. Adams, 1845): synonym of Pyrgocythara cinctella (Pfeiffer, 1840)
- Pyrgocythara hilli L.G. Hertlein & A.M. Strong, 1951: synonym of Pyrgocythara melita (W.H. Dall, 1919)
- Pyrgocythara jewetti R.E.C. Stearns, 1875: synonym of Pyrgocythara plicosa (Adams, 1850)
- Pyrgocythara lavalleana (d'Orbigny, 1847): synonym of Cryoturris lavalleana (d'Orbigny, 1847)
- Pyrgocythara luteofasciata (L.A. Reeve, 1845) : synonym of Pyrgocythara albovittata (C.B. Adams, 1845)
- Pyrgocythara metria (Dall, 1903): synonym of Vitricythara metria (Dall, 1903)
- Pyrgocythara obesicostata L.A. Reeve, 1846: synonym of Pyrgocythara guarani (A.V.M.D. D'Orbigny, 1841)
- Pyrgocythara pederseni L.G. Hertlein & A.M. Strong, 1951: synonym of Pyrgocythara danae (W.H. Dall, 1919)
- Pyrgocythara phaethusa (Dall, 1919): synonym of Notocytharella phaethusa (Dall, 1919)
- Pyrgocythara plicata C.B. Adams, 1840: synonym of Pyrgocythara plicosa (Adams, 1850)
