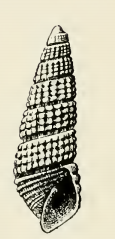
- Apertural view of the shell of Odostomia clathratula

Scientific classification
- Kingdom: Animalia
- Phylum: Mollusca
- Class: Gastropoda
- Family: Pyramidellidae
- Genus: Odostomia
- Species: O. clathratula

Binomial name
- Odostomia clathratula (C.B. Adams, 1852)

Synonyms
- Chrysallida clathratula (Adams, C.B., 1852); Pyrgulina clathratula C.B. Adams, 1852 (basionym)

= Odostomia clathratula =

Species of gastropod

Odostomia clathratula is a species of sea snail, a marine gastropod mollusc in the family Pyramidellidae, the pyrams and their allies.

== Description ==
The elongate-conic, slender shell is vitreous. It measures 2.5 mm. The two and one-half nuclear whorls form a depressed helicoid spire, whose axis is almost at right angles to that of the succeeding turns, in the first of which it is about one-half immersed. The seven post-nuclear whorls are very slightly rounded, strongly constricted at the sutures and prominently shouldered at the summit. They are marked by well rounded, tuberculate, axial ribs, of which 14 occur upon the first and second, 16 upon the third, 18 upon the fourth and fifth, and 24 upon the penultimate turn. In addition to the axial ribs, the whorls are marked between the sutures by four spiral cords which equal the ribs in strength, and render them tuberculate at their junction. The sutures are broadly and deeply channeled. The periphery and the somewhat prolonged base of the body whorl are well rounded, the latter marked by seven narrow, almost equal, and equally spaced spiral keels, the broad space between which and the peripheral sulcus are marked by many slender axial riblets. The aperture is oval. The outer lip is thin, showing the external sculpture within. The columella is stout, slightly curved, strongly reflected over the reinforcing base, provided with a strong fold at its insertion.

== Distribution ==
The species occurs in the Pacific Ocean off the Galapagos Islands and Panama.
