= Turbonilla reticulata =

Scientific classification
- Kingdom: Animalia
- Phylum: Mollusca
- Class: Gastropoda
- Family: Pyramidellidae
- Genus: Turbonilla
- Species: T. reticulata

Binomial name
- Turbonilla reticulata (C. B. Adams, 1850)

Species of gastropod

Turbonilla reticulata is a species of sea snail, a marine gastropod mollusk in the family Pyramidellidae, the pyrams and their allies.

== Distribution ==
This species occurs in the following locations:

- Caribbean Sea
- Gulf of Mexico
- Jamaica
- Puerto Rico
