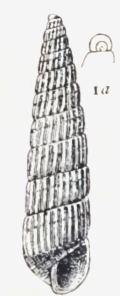
- Drawing of the shell and the protoconch of Turbonilla gracilior

Scientific classification
- Kingdom: Animalia
- Phylum: Mollusca
- Class: Gastropoda
- Family: Pyramidellidae
- Genus: Turbonilla
- Species: T. gracilior

Binomial name
- Turbonilla gracilior (C.B. Adams, 1852)

Synonyms
- Chemnitzia gracilior C. B. Adams p. 391.

= Turbonilla gracilior =

Species of gastropod

Turbonilla gracilior is a species of sea snail, a marine gastropod mollusk in the family Pyramidellidae.

== Description ==
The white shell has an elongate-conic shape. Its length measures 6.1 mm. (The whorls of the protoconch are decollated). The eleven whorls of the teleoconch are well-rounded. They are moderately shouldered at the summit; later ones are slightly exserted at it. They are marked by slender, curved, slightly protractive axial ribs, of which 16 occur upon the first and second, 18 upon the third, 20 upon the fourth to seventh, 22 upon the eighth, 26 upon the ninth, and 32 upon the penultimate turn. The intercostal spaces are about twice as wide as the ribs. A double series of pits mark them, the first at the periphery, the second a little posterior to the middle between the sutures. In addition to these pits, they are marked by fine, equal, and equally spaced spiral striations, of which thirty-one probably occur between the peripheral and median pits and twenty between that and the summit. The sutures are well-marked. The periphery and the base of the body whorl are well-rounded. The continuations of the axial ribs and numerous fine, well-incised, wavy spiral striations mark them. The aperture is rather long and rhomboidal. The outer lip is fractured. The columella is moderately strong, slightly curved and somewhat reflected. It is provided with a weak oblique fold at its insertion.

== Description ==
The type specimen of this marine species was found off Panama.
