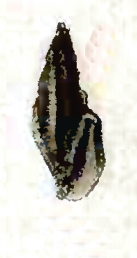
- Shell of Pyrgocythara crassicostata

Scientific classification
- Kingdom: Animalia
- Phylum: Mollusca
- Class: Gastropoda
- Subclass: Caenogastropoda
- Order: Neogastropoda
- Superfamily: Conoidea
- Family: Mangeliidae
- Genus: Pyrgocythara
- Species: P. crassicostata

Binomial name
- Pyrgocythara crassicostata (C. B. Adams, 1850)

Synonyms
- Mangilia badia L.A. Reeve, 1846

= Pyrgocythara crassicostata =

Species of gastropod

Pyrgocythara crassicostata, commonly known as the plicate mangelia, is a species of sea snail, a marine gastropod mollusk in the family Mangeliidae.

== Description ==
The length of the shell attains 5.6 mm.

The dark chestnut-brown shell is plicately ribbed and transversely strongly plicated.

== Distribution ==
This marine species occurs off Jamaica and Colombia.
