= Anachis gracilis =

Scientific classification
- Kingdom: Animalia
- Phylum: Mollusca
- Class: Gastropoda
- Subclass: Caenogastropoda
- Order: Neogastropoda
- Family: Columbellidae
- Genus: Anachis
- Species: A. gracilis

Binomial name
- Anachis gracilis (C. B. Adams, 1852)

Synonyms
- Columbella gracilis C. B. Adams, 1852 (original combination)

Species of gastropod

Anachis gracilis is a species of sea snail in the family Columbellidae, the dove snails.

== Description ==
The length of the shell (without protoconch) attains 15 mm, its diameter 10 mm.

(Original description) The shell has a long ovate-conic shape. Its upper whorls are pale brown, marked with irregular spots of darker reddish-brown, primarily near the suture. These spots nearly cover the body whorl, on the periphery of which runs a whitish band articulated with arrow-headed brown spots. The shell is covered with very numerous small ribs, of which only the posterior ends remain on the back of the body whorl. Anteriorly, it exhibits revolving striae.

The protoconch is acute, and the spire is conic. The eight whorls are scarcely convex, with the suture distinctly impressed. The aperture is narrow. The outer lip is variciform, rather sharp-edged, thickened behind, and a little sinuate posteriorly, featuring a few granules inside. The columellar lip is nearly smooth.

== Distribution ==
This species occurs in the Pacific Ocean off Mexico, Costa Rica, Nicaragua, Panama.
