= Crassispira elatior =

Scientific classification
- Kingdom: Animalia
- Phylum: Mollusca
- Class: Gastropoda
- Subclass: Caenogastropoda
- Order: Neogastropoda
- Superfamily: Conoidea
- Family: Pseudomelatomidae
- Genus: Crassispira
- Species: C. elatior

Binomial name
- Crassispira elatior (C. B. Adams, 1845)

Synonyms
- Crassispira adamsi De Jong & Coomans, 1988 (Unnecessary replacement name for Pleurotoma elatior C.B. Adams, 1845, believed to be preoccupied by P. elatior d'Orbigny, "1842" [in fact 1847]); Pleurotoma elatior C. B. Adams, 1845 (basionym)

Species of gastropod

Crassispira elatior is a species of sea snail, a marine gastropod mollusk in the family Pseudomelatomidae.

== Description ==
The length of the shell attains 5 mm, its diameter 2 mm.

The small, subconical shell contains 6 whorls. It has a whitish color with orange brown brands interrupted by the ribs. The whorls are convex and show 12 not very robust ribs and rather shallow decurrent spirals (on the penultimate whorl 19 ribs and 3 to 4 spirals). The sinus is deep. The outer lip shows a slight varix. The siphonal canal is very short.

== Distribution ==
This marine species occurs in the Caribbean Sea off Jamaica, Guadeloupe and Saint Martin
