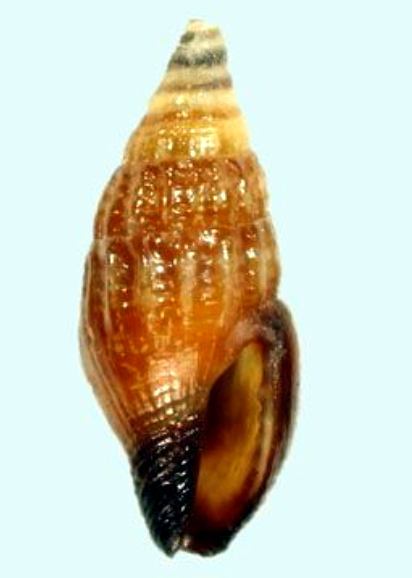
- Shell of Anachis moesta (specimen at Natural History Museum Rotterdam)

Scientific classification
- Kingdom: Animalia
- Phylum: Mollusca
- Class: Gastropoda
- Subclass: Caenogastropoda
- Order: Neogastropoda
- Family: Columbellidae
- Genus: Anachis
- Species: A. moesta

Binomial name
- Anachis moesta (C. B. Adams, 1852)

Synonyms
- Columbella moesta C. B. Adams, 1852 (original combination)

= Anachis moesta =

Species of gastropod

Anachis moesta is a species of sea snail in the family Columbellidae, the dove snails.

== Description ==
The shell attains a length of 7 mm, its diameter 1 1/3 mm.

(Original description) The shell is slender and subfusiform, appearing black or brownish-black, with the color less intense on the back of the body whorl. The upper whorls are smooth or display one or two revolving striae. Middle whorls feature twelve to fifteen ribs, with the interstices spirally striate. The ribs and striae become obsolete on the back of the body whorl, but are more strongly striated anteriorly.

The apex is acute, and the spire is very slender. The eight whorls are scarcely convex, with the suture lightly impressed. The aperture is long and narrow. The outer lip is variciform, very thick, sinuate posteriorly, and crenulated within. The columellar lip is nearly smooth.

== Distribution ==
This species occurs in the Pacific Ocean off Mexico, Costa Rica, Nicaragua, Panama.
