= Pyrgocythara vicina =

Scientific classification
- Kingdom: Animalia
- Phylum: Mollusca
- Class: Gastropoda
- Subclass: Caenogastropoda
- Order: Neogastropoda
- Superfamily: Conoidea
- Family: Mangeliidae
- Genus: Pyrgocythara
- Species: P. vicina

Binomial name
- Pyrgocythara vicina (C. B. Adams, 1850)

Synonyms
- Mangelia vicina C. B. Adams, 1850

Species of gastropod

Pyrgocythara vicina is a species of sea snail, a marine gastropod mollusk in the family Mangeliidae.

== Description ==
The length of the shell attains 4.3 mm.

(Original description) This moderately elongated, fusiform shell exhibits a dull brownish-red hue, accentuated by white coloration along the upper portions of the whorls and towards the anterior end.

Its surface is adorned with prominent transverse ribs, which are smooth at their summits, typically numbering around ten per whorl. Fine, uneven microscopic spiral striae are also present. The apex is sharply pointed, and the spire has gently curved outlines. The shell comprises approximately six moderately convex whorls, separated by a distinct suture. The aperture is relatively narrow, and the outer lip (labrum) is significantly thickened by the terminal rib. The sinus is quite spacious, and the siphonal canal is notably short.

This species is a non-broadcast spawner. Its life cycle does not include trocophore stage.

== Distribution ==
This marine species occurs off Jamaica, the Dominican Republic and the Bahamas.
