= Turbonilla obeliscus =

Scientific classification
- Kingdom: Animalia
- Phylum: Mollusca
- Class: Gastropoda
- Family: Pyramidellidae
- Genus: Turbonilla
- Species: T. obeliscus

Binomial name
- Turbonilla obeliscus (C. B. Adams, 1850)

Synonyms
- Turbonilla (Chemnitzia) obeliscus (C. B. Adams, 1850)

Species of gastropod

Turbonilla obeliscus is a species of sea snail, a marine gastropod mollusk in the family Pyramidellidae, the pyrams and their allies.

== Description ==
The shell grows to a length of 6.4 mm.

== Distribution ==
This species occurs in the following locations:

- Caribbean Sea : Jamaica
- Gulf of Mexico
- Atlantic Ocean : North Carolina, United States
