= Turbonilla multicostata =

Scientific classification
- Kingdom: Animalia
- Phylum: Mollusca
- Class: Gastropoda
- Family: Pyramidellidae
- Genus: Turbonilla
- Species: T. multicostata

Binomial name
- Turbonilla multicostata (C. B. Adams, 1850)

Synonyms
- Turbonilla (Chemnitzia) multicostata (C. B. Adams, 1850)

Species of gastropod

Turbonilla multicostata is a species of sea snail, a marine gastropod mollusk in the family Pyramidellidae, the pyrams and their allies.

== Description ==
The shell grows to a length of 4.2 mm.

== Distribution ==
This species occurs in the following locations:

- Caribbean Sea (Jamaica; Yucatán, Mexico)
- Gulf of Mexico
- Atlantic Ocean : off North Carolina.
