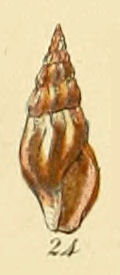
- Haedropleura septangularis shell

Scientific classification
- Kingdom: Animalia
- Phylum: Mollusca
- Class: Gastropoda
- Subclass: Caenogastropoda
- Order: Neogastropoda
- Superfamily: Conoidea
- Family: Horaiclavidae
- Genus: Haedropleura; Monterosato in Bucquoy, Dautzenberg & Dollfus, 1883

Type species
- Murex septangularis Montagu, 1803

Species
- See text

Synonyms
- Bela (Haedropleura)

= Haedropleura =

Genus of gastropods

Haedropleura is a genus of sea snails, marine gastropod mollusks in the family Horaiclavidae.

It was formerly included within the subfamily Crassispirinae, family Turridae.

According to Nordsieck (1968, 1977) and Van Aartsen et al. (1984) Haedropleura Bucquoy, Dautzenberg & Dollfus, 1883 is a junior synonym of Bellaspira Conrad, 1868. The latter gets priority. However, this not backed by distinctions at the genus level, which puts Bellaspira in the family Drilliidae. Their characters have been poorly defined until the study by Scarponi, Daniele, Giano Della Bella, and Alessandro Ceregato. "The genus Haedropleura (Neogastropoda, Toxoglossa-Conoidea) in the Plio-Quaternary of the Mediterranean basin." Zootaxa 2796.1 (2011): 37-55.

== Species ==
Species within the genus Haedropleura include:

- † Haedropleura brebioni Landau, Van Dingenen & Ceulemans, 2020
- † Haedropleura bucciniformis (Bellardi, 1847) (synonym of Raphitoma bucciniformis Bellardi, 1847)
- † Haedropleura contii (Bellardi, 1877) (synonym of Bela contii Bellardi, 1877)
- Haedropleura continua (Melvill, J.C. & R. Standen, 1903)
- Haedropleura flexicosta Monterosato, 1884
- Haedropleura forbesi Locard, 1891 (taxon inquirendum)
- † Haedropleura formosa Scarponi, Daniele, Giano Della Bella, and Alessandro Ceregato, 2011
- † Haedropleura fratemcontii Ceulemans, Van Dingenen & Landau, 2018
- † Haedropleura gallica Landau, Van Dingenen & Ceulemans, 2020
- Haedropleura hanleyi Locard, 1892 (taxon inquirendum)
- † Haedropleura heptagonalis Cossmann, 1913
- Haedropleura horma W.-M. Feng, 1996
- Haedropleura ima (Bartsch, 1915)
- Haedropleura laeta (Thiele, 1925)
- † Haedropleura ligeriana Landau, Van Dingenen & Ceulemans, 2020
- † Haedropleura maitreja (Koenen, 1872)
- † Haedropleura miocaenica (Boettger, 1902)
- † Haedropleura orientalis Vredenburg, 1923
- † Haedropleura parva Scarponi, Daniele, Giano Della Bella, and Alessandro Ceregato, 2011
- Haedropleura pellyi (Smith, 1882)
- Haedropleura pygmaea (Dunker, 1860)
- Haedropleura ryalli Horro, Gori & Rolán, 2010
- Haedropleura secalina (Philippi, 1844)
- Haedropleura septangularis (Montagu, 1803)
- Haedropleura summa Kilburn, 1988

Species brought into synonymy

- Haedropleura beetsi Glibert, 1960: synonym of Cytharella beetsi (Glibert, 1960)
- Haedropleura crystallina Boettger, 1906:synonym of Nitidiclavus crystallinus (Boettger, 1906)
- Haedropleura dora Thiele, 1925: synonym of Haedropleura ima (Bartsch, 1915)
- Haedropleura fukuchiana Yokoyama, 1922: synonym of Haedropleura pygmaea (Dunker, 1860)
- Haedropleura maltzani Knudsen, 1952: synonym of Anacithara maltzani (Knudsen, 1952)
- Haedropleura melita Dall, 1919: synonym of Pyrgocythara melita (Dall, 1919)
- Haedropleura rigida Reeve, 1846: synonym of Haedropleura septangularis rigida (Reeve, 1846)
- Haedropleura septangularis albida Monterosato, 1878: synonym of Haedropleura septangularis (Montagu, 1803)
- Haedropleura septangularis fulva Monterosato, 1878: synonym of Haedropleura septangularis (Montagu, 1803)
- Haedropleura septangularis maculata Monterosato, 1878: synonym of Haedropleura septangularis (Montagu, 1803)
