= Turbonilla exilis =

Scientific classification
- Kingdom: Animalia
- Phylum: Mollusca
- Class: Gastropoda
- Family: Pyramidellidae
- Genus: Turbonilla
- Species: T. exilis

Binomial name
- Turbonilla exilis (C. B. Adams, 1850)

Synonyms
- Chemnitzia exilis C. B. Adams, 1850 (basionym); Pyrgiscus exilis (C. B. Adams, 1850); Turbonilla (Chemnitzia) exilis (C. B. Adams, 1850)

Species of gastropod

Turbonilla exilis is a species of sea snail, a marine gastropod mollusk in the family Pyramidellidae, the pyrams and their allies.

== Description ==
The shell grows to a length of 4.2 mm. Color is often a white or beige, shape most closely resembles a turriform.

== Distribution ==
This marine species occurs in the following locations at depths between 5 m to 115 m:

- Atlantic Ocean: North Carolina
- Caribbean Sea: Florida; Jamaica, Haiti
- Lesser Antilles: Virgin Islands: St. Croix
