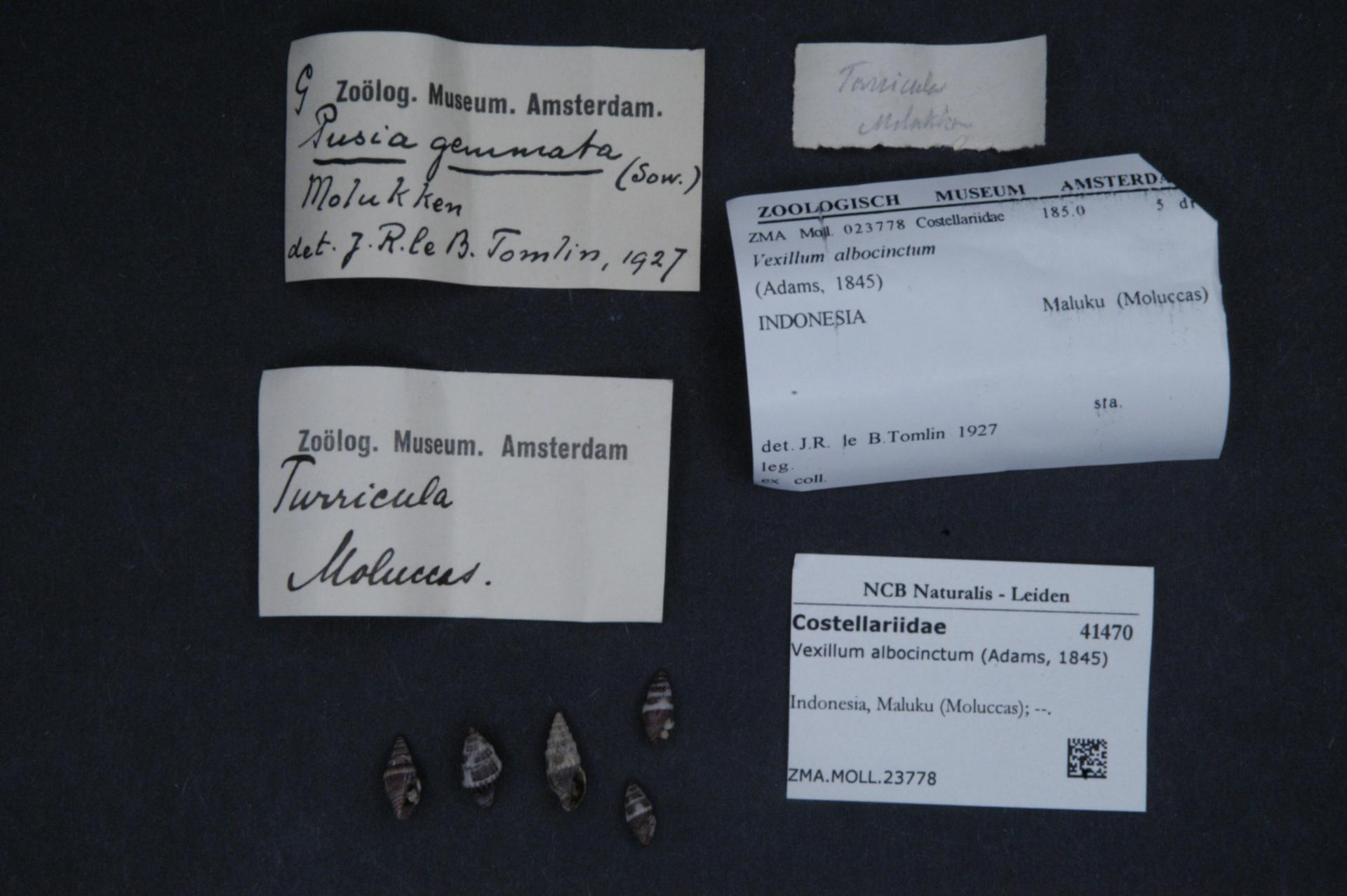
- Vexillum albocinctum

Scientific classification
- Kingdom: Animalia
- Phylum: Mollusca
- Class: Gastropoda
- Subclass: Caenogastropoda
- Order: Neogastropoda
- Family: Costellariidae
- Genus: Vexillum
- Species: V. albocinctum

Binomial name
- Vexillum albocinctum (C. B. Adams, 1845)

Synonyms
- Vexillum (Pusia) albocinctum (C. B. Adams, 1845)

= Vexillum albocinctum =

Species of gastropod

Vexillum albocinctum is a species of small sea snail, marine gastropod mollusk in the family Costellariidae, the ribbed miters.

== Description ==
Individuals can grow to 11.1 mm.

== Distribution ==
This organism is known to be present in the Southern United States location or region but is not exclusive; other regions may also be reported.
