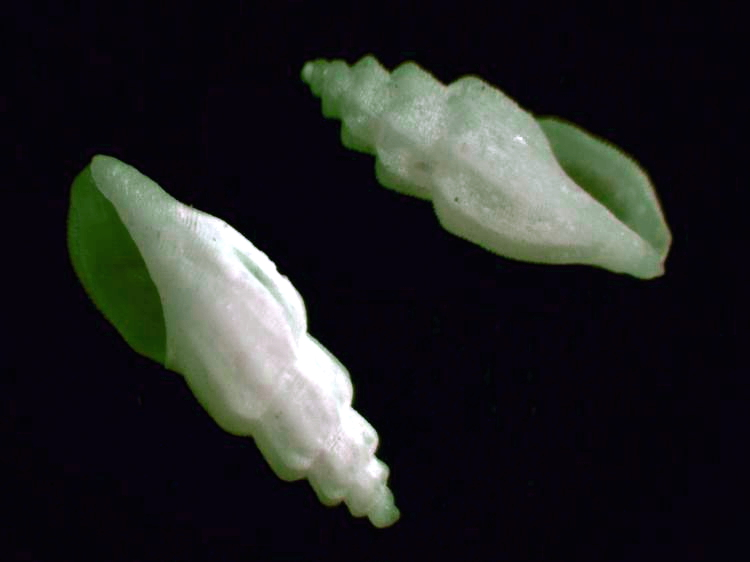
- Shells of Pyrgocythara densestriata

Scientific classification
- Kingdom: Animalia
- Phylum: Mollusca
- Class: Gastropoda
- Subclass: Caenogastropoda
- Order: Neogastropoda
- Superfamily: Conoidea
- Family: Mangeliidae
- Genus: Pyrgocythara
- Species: P. densestriata

Binomial name
- Pyrgocythara densestriata (C. B. Adams, 1850)

Synonyms
- Mangelia densestriata Adams C. B., 1850

= Pyrgocythara densestriata =

Species of gastropod

Pyrgocythara densestriata is a species of sea snail, a marine gastropod mollusk in the family Mangeliidae.

== Description ==
The white shell, without band, contains 10 to 12 longitudinal ribs.

== Distribution ==
This species occurs in the Caribbean Sea off Cuba and in the West Indies.
