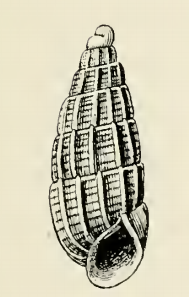
- Apertural view of a shell of Odostomia marginata

Scientific classification
- Kingdom: Animalia
- Phylum: Mollusca
- Class: Gastropoda
- Family: Pyramidellidae
- Genus: Odostomia
- Species: O. marginata

Binomial name
- Odostomia marginata (C.B. Adams, 1852)

Synonyms
- Chemnitzia marginata C.B. Adams, 1852; Odostomia (Pyrgulina) marginata C.B. Adams, 1852

= Odostomia marginata =

Species of gastropod

Odostomia marginata is a species of sea snail, a marine gastropod mollusc in the family Pyramidellidae, the pyrams and their allies.

== Description ==
The small shell is elongate-conic, rather stout and semitranslucent. The nuclear whorls are small, two and one-half, forming: a depressed helicoid spire, whose axis is at right angles to that of the succeeding turns, in the first of which it is about one-fourth immersed. Post-nuclear whorls are flattened, moderately contracted at the sutures and slightly shouldered at the summit, marked by very strong, lamellar, somewhat retractive axial ribs, of which 14 occur upon all of the whorls. The termination of these ribs form cusps at the summits. Intercostal spaces are four times as wide as the ribs, marked by six equal and equally spaced incised lines, the space between the summit and the first line below it appearing as a thickened cord. The sutures are well impressed. The periphery of the body whorl and base is well rounded, marked by the strong continuation of the axial ribs and about five incised spiral lines. The aperture is ovate. The posterior angle is acute. The outer lip is thin, showing the external sculpture within. The columella is stout, slightly curved and somewhat r volute. The parietal wall is covered by a very strong callus.
