= Odostomia solidula =

Scientific classification
- Kingdom: Animalia
- Phylum: Mollusca
- Class: Gastropoda
- Family: Pyramidellidae
- Genus: Odostomia
- Species: O. solidula

Binomial name
- Odostomia solidula C. B. Adams, 1850

Species of gastropod

Odostomia solidula is a species of sea snail, a marine gastropod mollusc in the family Pyramidellidae, the pyrams and their allies.

== Distribution ==
This species occurs in the following locations:

- Caribbean Sea
- Cuba
- Gulf of Mexico
- Jamaica
- Mexico
- Puerto Rico
