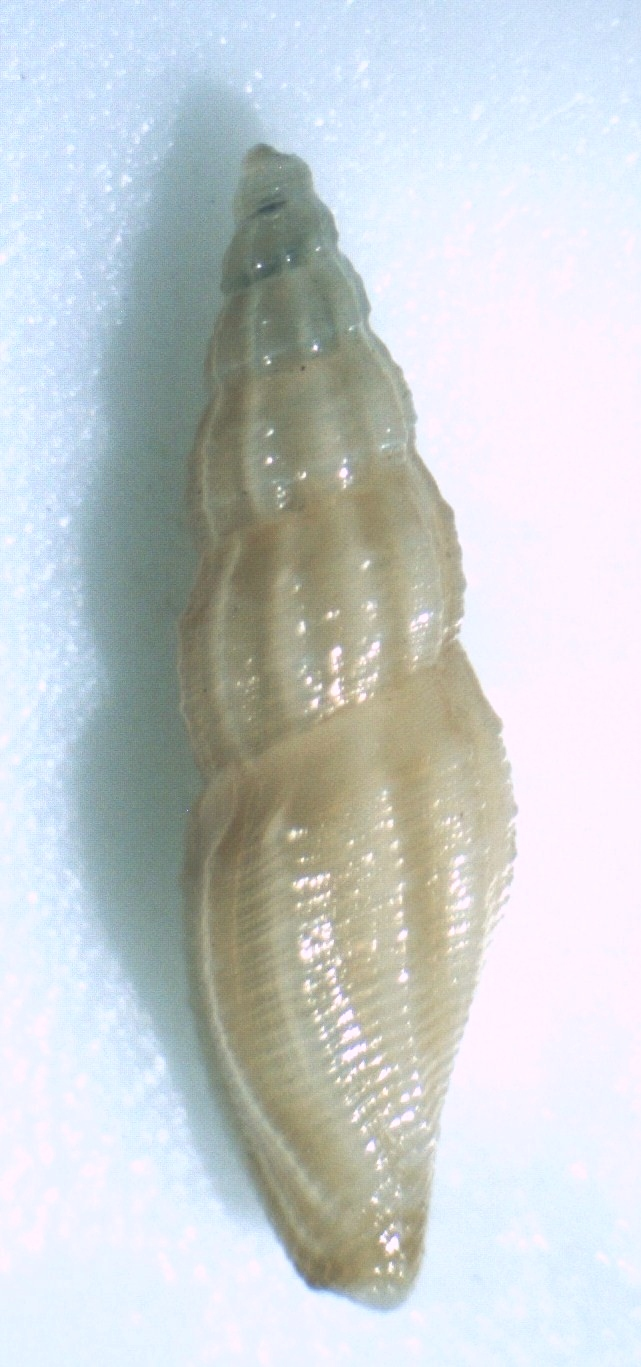
- Shell of Notocytharella striosa

Scientific classification
- Kingdom: Animalia
- Phylum: Mollusca
- Class: Gastropoda
- Subclass: Caenogastropoda
- Order: Neogastropoda
- Superfamily: Conoidea
- Family: Mangeliidae
- Genus: Notocytharella
- Species: N. striosa

Binomial name
- Notocytharella striosa (C. B. Adams, 1852)

Synonyms
- Mangilia striosa (C. B. Adams, 1852); Notocytharella hastula H.A. Pilsbry & H.N. Lowe, 1932; Notocytharella niobe (Dall, 1919); Pleurotoma exigua Adams, C.B., 1852; Pleurotoma striosa C. B. Adams, 1852 (original combination)

= Notocytharella striosa =

Species of gastropod

Notocytharella striosa is a species of sea snail, a marine gastropod mollusk in the family Mangeliidae.

== Description ==
The length of the shell varies between 6 mm and 8 mm.

The slender shell is dingy white, with a rather indistinct narrow central brown band on the body whorl. It contains 10-12 slender longitudinal ribs, crossed by close elevated revolving lines. The outer lip is rather sharp on the edge but thickened behind it by a stout rib.

== Distribution ==
This marine species occurs off Baja California, Mexico.
