= Tenaturris concinna =

Scientific classification
- Kingdom: Animalia
- Phylum: Mollusca
- Class: Gastropoda
- Subclass: Caenogastropoda
- Order: Neogastropoda
- Superfamily: Conoidea
- Family: Mangeliidae
- Genus: Tenaturris
- Species: T. concinna

Binomial name
- Tenaturris concinna (C. B. Adams, 1852)

Synonyms
- Cithara sinuata P. P. Carpenter, 1856 junior subjective synonym; Daphnella sinuata; Pleurotoma concinna Adams C. B., 1852

Species of gastropod

Tenaturris concinna is a species of sea snail, a marine gastropod mollusk in the family Mangeliidae.

== Description ==
The length of the shell varies between 6 mm and 12 mm.

(Original description) The fusiform shell is white, tinged more or less with reddish brown. It shows numerous crowded small ribs, which become obsolete near the outer lip, and crowded spiral striae, which are finer on the spire. The: apex is cute. The spire shows moderately convex outlines:. The shell contains eight whorls. These are angular along the middle, with a moderately impressed suture. The aperture is very long and narrow. The outer lip is very much thickened a little behind the edge, with the sinus deep and very near the suture. The siphonal canal is scarcely distinct from the aperture.

== Distribution ==
This species occurs in the Pacific Ocean off Panama.
