= Turbonilla levis =

Scientific classification
- Kingdom: Animalia
- Phylum: Mollusca
- Class: Gastropoda
- Family: Pyramidellidae
- Genus: Turbonilla
- Species: T. levis

Binomial name
- Turbonilla levis (C. B. Adams, 1850)

Synonyms
- Chemnitzia laevis sic; Turbonilla laevis sic; Oxytrema crenulatum Menke, 1830; Turbonilla pulchella auct. non d'Orbigny, 1842; Turbonilla (Chemnitzia) levis (C. B. Adams, 1850); Chemnitzia levis C. B. Adams, 1850; Turbonilla hippolyta Bartsch, 1955; Turbonilla hesperusi Bartsch, 1955; Turbonilla geryoni Bartsch, 1955; Turbonilla cerberusi Bartsch, 1955; Turbonilla cacusi Bartsch, 1955; Turbonilla alcmena Bartsch, 1955

Species of gastropod

Turbonilla levis, common name the delicate turbonilla, is a species of sea snail, a marine gastropod mollusk in the family Pyramidellidae, the pyrams and their allies.

== Description ==
The shell grows to a length of 2.8 mm to 4.6 mm.

== Distribution ==
This species occurs in the following locations:

- Aruba
- Bonaire
- Caribbean Sea : Colombia, Costa Rica, Curaçao, Jamaica
- Gulf of Mexico
- Atlantic Ocean: off North Carolina
