= Tenaturris multilineata =

Scientific classification
- Kingdom: Animalia
- Phylum: Mollusca
- Class: Gastropoda
- Subclass: Caenogastropoda
- Order: Neogastropoda
- Superfamily: Conoidea
- Family: Mangeliidae
- Genus: Tenaturris
- Species: T. multilineata

Binomial name
- Tenaturris multilineata (C. B. Adams, 1845)

Synonyms
- Mangelia polyzonata Adams, H.G. & A. Adams, 1853 (nomen novum); Mangilia multilineata (Adams, C.B., 1845); Mangilia polyzonata Adams, H.G. & A. Adams, 1853; Pleurotoma multilineata Adams, C.B., 1845

Species of gastropod

Tenaturris multilineata is a species of sea snail, a marine gastropod mollusk in the family Mangeliidae.

== Description ==
The length of the shell attains 4.6 mm.

The small shell is golden yellow with many white lines. It contains 6 whorls with 8–10 longitudinal ribs expanding at the base. The spiral sculpture consists of close, decurrent, inequal striae. The suture is deep. The sinus is large. The siphonal canal is very short.

== Distribution ==
This species occurs in the Caribbean Sea off Jamaica.
