= P. danae =

P. danae may refer to:

- Planctoteuthis danae, a squid species
- Pyrgocythara danae, a sea snail species

== See also ==
- Danae (disambiguation)
