= Turbonilla affinis =

Scientific classification
- Kingdom: Animalia
- Phylum: Mollusca
- Class: Gastropoda
- Family: Pyramidellidae
- Genus: Turbonilla
- Species: T. affinis

Binomial name
- Turbonilla affinis (C.B. Adams, 1852)

Species of gastropod

Turbonilla affinis is a species of sea snail, a marine gastropod mollusk in the family Pyramidellidae, the pyrams and their allies.
