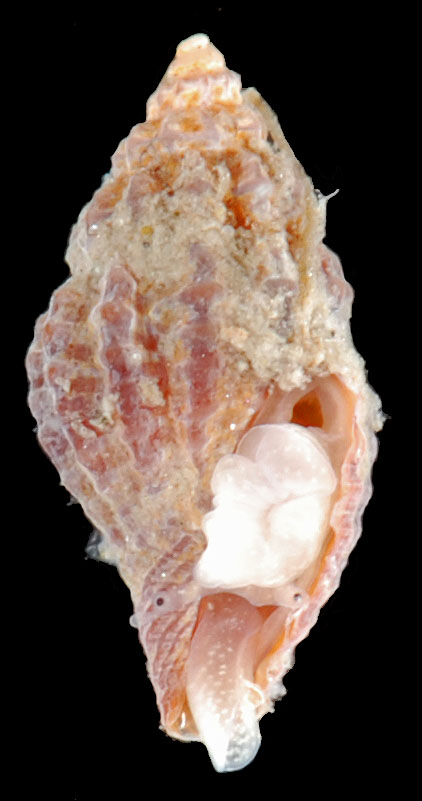

Scientific classification
- Kingdom: Animalia
- Phylum: Mollusca
- Class: Gastropoda
- Subclass: Caenogastropoda
- Order: Neogastropoda
- Superfamily: Conoidea
- Family: Mangeliidae
- Genus: Pyrgocythara
- Species: P. plicosa

Binomial name
- Pyrgocythara plicosa (C. B. Adams, 1850)

Synonyms
- Clathurella jewetti Stearns, 1873; Mangelia plicosa C. B. Adams, 1850; Pleurotoma brunnea Perkins, 1869; Pleurotoma plicata C. B. Adams, 1840 (invalid: junior homonym of Pleurotoma plicata Lamarck, 1804; Pleurotoma plicosa and P. brunnea Perkins, 1869 are replacement names); Pleurotoma plicosa (C. B. Adams, 1850); Pyrgospira plicosa (C. B. Adams, 1850)

= Pyrgocythara plicosa =

Species of gastropod

Pyrgocythara plicosa, common name the plicate mangelia, is a species of sea snail, a marine gastropod mollusk in the family Mangeliidae.

== Description ==
The size of the shell varies between 6 mm and 13 mm.

== Distribution ==
P. plicosa can be found in Atlantic Ocean and Caribbean Sea waters, ranging from the coast of Massachusetts, United States to south to Panama. Fossils have been found in Quaternary strata of the United States (Florida, New Jersey) age range: 0.126 to 0.012 Ma.
