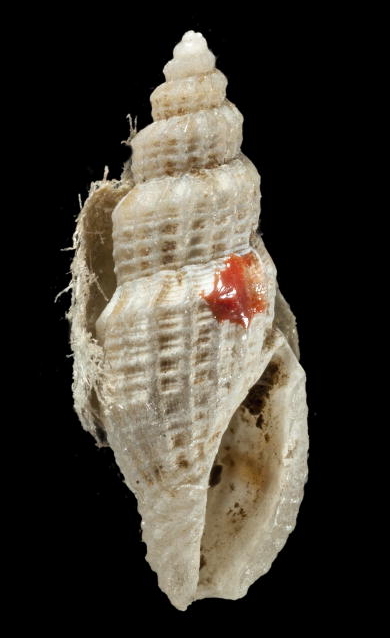
- Shell of Tenaturris gemma (specimen at the Natural History Museum, London)

Scientific classification
- Kingdom: Animalia
- Phylum: Mollusca
- Class: Gastropoda
- Subclass: Caenogastropoda
- Order: Neogastropoda
- Superfamily: Conoidea
- Family: Mangeliidae
- Genus: Tenaturris
- Species: T. gemma

Binomial name
- Tenaturris gemma (E.A. Smith, 1884)

Synonyms
- Pleurotoma gemma E.A. Smith, 1884

= Tenaturris gemma =

Species of gastropod

Tenaturris gemma is a species of sea snail, a marine gastropod mollusk in the family Mangeliidae.
