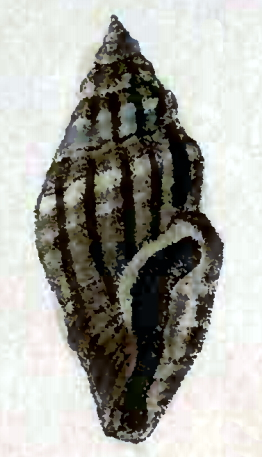
- Shell of Pyrgocythara guarani

Scientific classification
- Domain: Eukaryota
- Kingdom: Animalia
- Phylum: Mollusca
- Class: Gastropoda
- Subclass: Caenogastropoda
- Order: Neogastropoda
- Superfamily: Conoidea
- Family: Mangeliidae
- Genus: Pyrgocythara
- Species: P. guarani

Binomial name
- Pyrgocythara guarani (d' Orbigny, 1841)

Synonyms
- Daphnella (Mangilia) guarani (Orbigny, 1841); Mangelia guarani (Orbigny, 1841); Pleurotoma guarani Orbigny, 1841 (original description); Pleurotoma obesicostata Reeve, L.A., 1846

= Pyrgocythara guarani =

Species of gastropod

Pyrgocythara guarani is a species of sea snail, a marine gastropod mollusk in the family Conidae, the cone snails and their allies.

== Description ==
The length of the shell attains 5.5 mm.

The brownish shell shows sometimes narrow, lighter bands. The longitudinal ribs are prominent, rounded, crenelating the suture; There are elevated revolving lines.

== Distribution ==
This marine species occurs off Florida, USA, and Southeastern Brazil.
