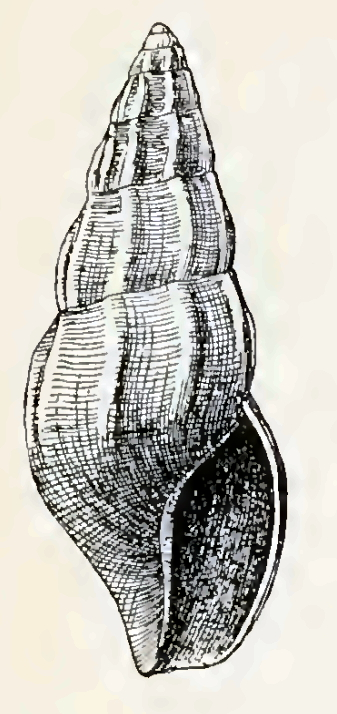
- Original image of a shell of Haedropleura ima

Scientific classification
- Kingdom: Animalia
- Phylum: Mollusca
- Class: Gastropoda
- Subclass: Caenogastropoda
- Order: Neogastropoda
- Superfamily: Conoidea
- Family: Horaiclavidae
- Genus: Haedropleura
- Species: H. ima

Binomial name
- Haedropleura ima (Bartsch, 1915)

Synonyms
- Cythara ima Bartsch, 1915; Haedropleura dora Thiele, 1925

= Haedropleura ima =

Species of gastropod

Haedropleura ima is a species of sea snail, a marine gastropod mollusk in the family Horaiclavidae.

It was previously included within the family Turridae, the turrids.

== Description ==
The length of the shell attains 8.1 mm, its diameter 3.5 mm.

(Original description) The shell is white. The protoconch contains two smooth whorls. The other whorls are moderately rounded, with closely appressed summits marked by weak, depressed, rather broad, slightly protractive axial ribs, of which 10 occur upon the first three whorls, 12 upon the fourth and penultimate. One of the ribs is decidedly thicker, forming a strong varix. This feature is common to all of our specimens. The intercostal spaces about twice as wide as the ribs and very shallow. In addition to the axial sculpture the entire surface of the spire and the base is marked by equal and almost equally spaced, closely placed, wavy, incised, spiral lines, of which about 24 occur between the sutures on the penultimate turn and about 30 upon the base of the body whorl. The sutures are ill-defined. The aperture has an acute posterior angle. The outer lip is thick within, sharp at the edge. The sinus is scarcely indicated a little distance anterior to the summit. The columella is almost straight, covered by a thin callus, which extends up on the parietal wall, forming a tubercle near the posterior angle.

== Distribution ==
This marine species occurs off Port Alfred, South Africa
