= Pyrgocythara fuscoligata =

Scientific classification
- Kingdom: Animalia
- Phylum: Mollusca
- Class: Gastropoda
- Subclass: Caenogastropoda
- Order: Neogastropoda
- Superfamily: Conoidea
- Family: Mangeliidae
- Genus: Pyrgocythara
- Species: P. fuscoligata

Binomial name
- Pyrgocythara fuscoligata (Carpenter, 1856)

Synonyms
- Clathurella rigida fuscoligata (Carpenter, 1856); Mangelia fuscoligata Carpenter, 1856

Species of gastropod

Pyrgocythara fuscoligata is a species of sea snail, a marine gastropod mollusk in the family Mangeliidae.

== Distribution ==
This marine species occurs off Pacific Panama.
