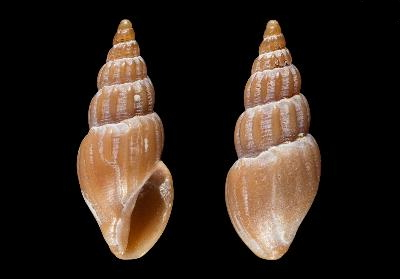
- Shell of Haedropleura forbesi (syntype in the MNHN, Paris)

Scientific classification
- Kingdom: Animalia
- Phylum: Mollusca
- Class: Gastropoda
- Subclass: Caenogastropoda
- Order: Neogastropoda
- Superfamily: Conoidea
- Family: Horaiclavidae
- Genus: Haedropleura
- Species: H. forbesi

Binomial name
- Haedropleura forbesi Locard, 1891

= Haedropleura forbesi =

Species of gastropod

Haedropleura forbesi is a species of sea snail, a marine gastropod mollusk in the family Horaiclavidae.

It was previously included within the family Turridae.

It is species inquirenda. It is spurious taxon, of which no types could be traced and it may be a species of Propebela.

== Distribution ==
This species occurs in the Mediterranean Sea off France and off the Atlantic coast of France.
