= Tenaturris decora =

Scientific classification
- Kingdom: Animalia
- Phylum: Mollusca
- Class: Gastropoda
- Subclass: Caenogastropoda
- Order: Neogastropoda
- Superfamily: Conoidea
- Family: Mangeliidae
- Genus: Tenaturris
- Species: T. decora

Binomial name
- Tenaturris decora (E.A. Smith, 1882)

Synonyms
- Pleurotoma costata Reeve, L.A., 1845 (renamed); Pleurotoma (Mangilia) decora E.A. Smith, 1882

Species of gastropod

Tenaturris decora is a species of sea snail, a marine gastropod mollusk in the family Mangeliidae.

== Distribution ==
This species occurs in the Caribbean Sea off Colombia and the Lesser Antilles; also off Northern Brazil.
