= Pyrgocythara filosa =

Scientific classification
- Kingdom: Animalia
- Phylum: Mollusca
- Class: Gastropoda
- Subclass: Caenogastropoda
- Order: Neogastropoda
- Superfamily: Conoidea
- Family: Mangeliidae
- Genus: Pyrgocythara
- Species: P. filosa

Binomial name
- Pyrgocythara filosa Rehder, 1943

Species of gastropod

Pyrgocythara filosa is a species of sea snail, a marine gastropod mollusk in the family Mangeliidae.

== Description ==
The length of the shell attains 6.5 mm.

== Distribution ==
P. filosa can be found in Caribbean waters, ranging from the western coast of Florida south to Colombia.
