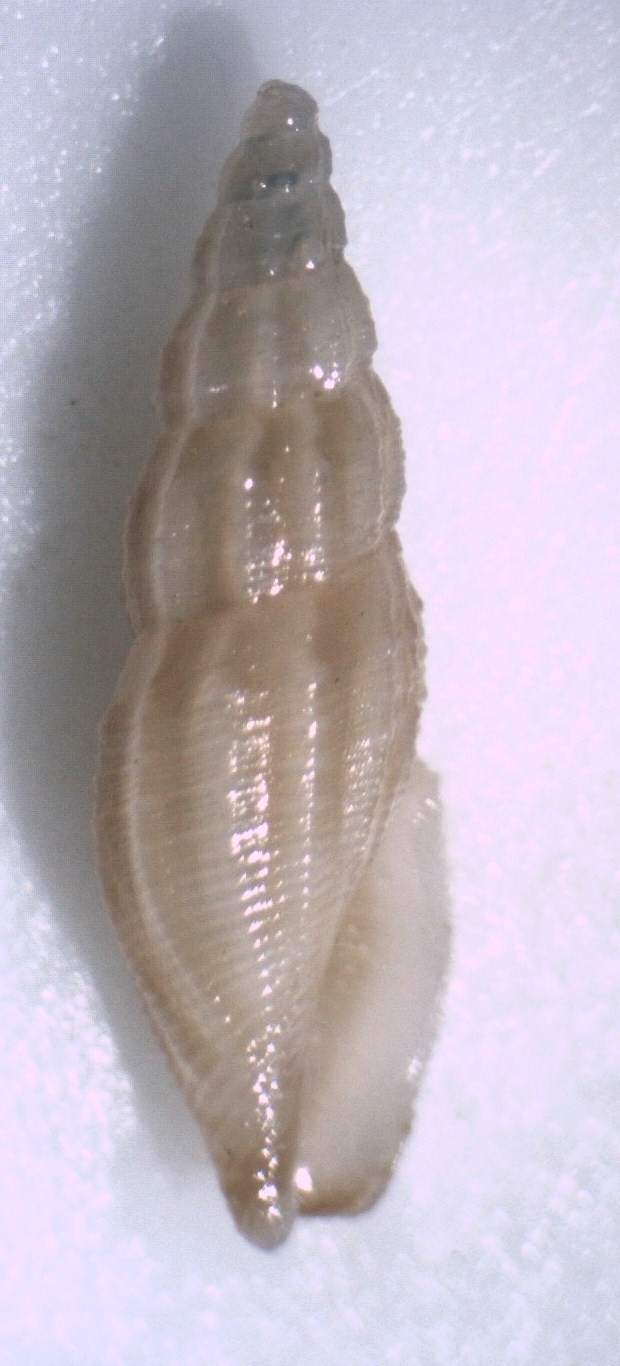
- Notocytharella striosa

Scientific classification
- Kingdom: Animalia
- Phylum: Mollusca
- Class: Gastropoda
- Subclass: Caenogastropoda
- Order: Neogastropoda
- Superfamily: Conoidea
- Family: Mangeliidae
- Genus: Notocytharella; Hertlein & Strong, 1955

Type species
- Cytharella niobe Dall, 1919

Species
- See text

= Notocytharella =

Genus of gastropods

Notocytharella is a genus of sea snails, marine gastropod mollusks in the family Mangeliidae.

== Species ==
Species within the genus Notocytharella include :

- Notocytharella phaethusa (Dall, 1919)
- Notocytharella striosa (Adams C. B., 1852)

Species brought into synonymy

- Notocytharella hastula H.A. Pilsbry & H.N. Lowe, 1932: synonym of Notocytharella striosa (C.B. Adams, 1852)
- Notocytharella kwangdangensis (M.M. Schepman, 1913): synonym of Otitoma kwandangensis (M.M. Schepman, 1913)
- Notocytharella niobe (Dall, 1919): synonym of Notocytharella striosa (C.B. Adams, 1852)
