= Pyrgocythara hamata =

Scientific classification
- Kingdom: Animalia
- Phylum: Mollusca
- Class: Gastropoda
- Subclass: Caenogastropoda
- Order: Neogastropoda
- Superfamily: Conoidea
- Family: Mangeliidae
- Genus: Pyrgocythara
- Species: P. hamata

Binomial name
- Pyrgocythara hamata (d' Orbigny, 1841)

Synonyms
- Mangelia cerea Carpenter, P.P., 1865; Mangelia hamata Carpenter, 1865 (original combination)

Species of gastropod

Pyrgocythara hamata is a species of sea snail, a marine gastropod mollusk in the family Mangeliidae.

== Description ==
The length of the shell attains 6.3 mm.

(Original description) This flesh-tinted orange species is easily recognized by the varicose lip, sloping off to a sharp edge; by the deeply cut posterior notch, giving the smooth aperture a hooked appearance and with an intense color in its interior; by the sharp ridges, traversed by distant spiral threads. The protoconch contains two smooth, globose whorls. The subsequent six whorls are moderately long, subangulate and with impressed suture. They are crossed by 10–12 acute longitudinal ribs that continue to the base of the shell. The interstices are concave.

== Distribution ==
This marine species occurs off Pacific Panama.
