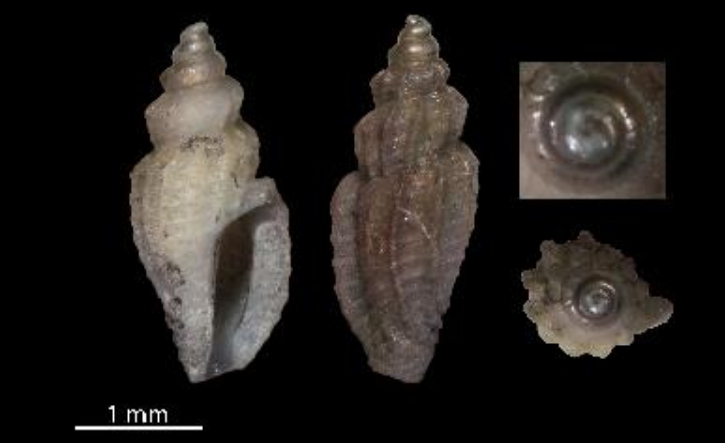
- Shell (with protoconch) of Pyrgocythara mairelae

Scientific classification
- Kingdom: Animalia
- Phylum: Mollusca
- Class: Gastropoda
- Subclass: Caenogastropoda
- Order: Neogastropoda
- Superfamily: Conoidea
- Family: Mangeliidae
- Genus: Pyrgocythara
- Species: P. mairelae

Binomial name
- Pyrgocythara mairelae Fernández-Garcés & Rolán, 2010

= Pyrgocythara mairelae =

Species of gastropod

Pyrgocythara mairelae, is a species of sea snail, a marine gastropod mollusk in the family Mangeliidae.

== Description ==
The length of the shell attains 2.7 mm.

== Distribution ==
This marine species occurs off Cuba
