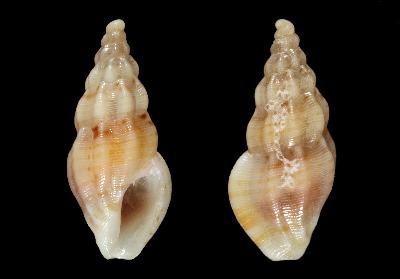
- Shell of Haedropleura ryalli (holotype at MNHN, Paris)

Scientific classification
- Kingdom: Animalia
- Phylum: Mollusca
- Class: Gastropoda
- Subclass: Caenogastropoda
- Order: Neogastropoda
- Superfamily: Conoidea
- Family: Horaiclavidae
- Genus: Haedropleura
- Species: H. ryalli

Binomial name
- Haedropleura ryalli Horro, Gori & Rolán, 2010

= Haedropleura ryalli =

Species of gastropod

Haedropleura ryalli is a species of sea snail, a marine gastropod mollusk in the family Horaiclavidae.

== Distribution ==
This marine species occurs in the Gulf of Guinea off São Tomé island.
