= Haedropleura secalina =

Scientific classification
- Kingdom: Animalia
- Phylum: Mollusca
- Class: Gastropoda
- Subclass: Caenogastropoda
- Order: Neogastropoda
- Superfamily: Conoidea
- Family: Horaiclavidae
- Genus: Haedropleura
- Species: H. secalina

Binomial name
- Haedropleura secalina (Philippi, 1844)

Synonyms
- Bellaspira secalina Nordsieck, 1977; Haedropleura septangularis var. secalina (Philippi, 1844); Mangelia secalina (Philippi, 1844); Pleurotoma secalinum Philippi, 1844; Pleurotoma septangularis var. secalina (Philippi, 1844)

Species of gastropod

Haedropleura secalina is a species of sea snail, a marine gastropod mollusk in the family Horaiclavidae.

It was previously included within the family Turridae, the turrids.

It has been found as a fossil in the Redonien Formation in France.

== Distribution ==
This species occurs in the entire Mediterranean Sea, especially off Southern Italy; and off Turkey; in the Atlantic Ocean off the Canary Islands and Funchal.
