= Haedropleura laeta =

Scientific classification
- Kingdom: Animalia
- Phylum: Mollusca
- Class: Gastropoda
- Subclass: Caenogastropoda
- Order: Neogastropoda
- Superfamily: Conoidea
- Family: Horaiclavidae
- Genus: Haedropleura
- Species: H. laeta

Binomial name
- Haedropleura laeta (Thiele, J., 1925)

Species of gastropod

Haedropleura laeta is a species of sea snail, a marine gastropod mollusk in the family Horaiclavidae.

== Distribution ==
This marine species occurs off Sumatra, Indonesia.
