= Pyrgocythara angulosa =

Scientific classification
- Kingdom: Animalia
- Phylum: Mollusca
- Class: Gastropoda
- Subclass: Caenogastropoda
- Order: Neogastropoda
- Superfamily: Conoidea
- Family: Mangeliidae
- Genus: Pyrgocythara
- Species: P. angulosa

Binomial name
- Pyrgocythara angulosa McLean & Poorman, 1971

Species of gastropod

Pyrgocythara angulosa is a species of sea snail, a marine gastropod mollusk in the family Mangeliidae.

== Distribution ==
This species occurs in the Pacific Ocean off Mexico.
