= Haedropleura hanleyi =

Scientific classification
- Kingdom: Animalia
- Phylum: Mollusca
- Class: Gastropoda
- Subclass: Caenogastropoda
- Order: Neogastropoda
- Superfamily: Conoidea
- Family: Horaiclavidae
- Genus: Haedropleura
- Species: H. hanleyi

Binomial name
- Haedropleura hanleyi Locard, 1891

Species of gastropod

Haedropleura hanleyi is a species of sea snail, a marine gastropod mollusk in the family Horaiclavidae.

It was previously included within the family Turridae.

It is species inquirenda. It is spurious taxon, of which no types could be traced and it may be a species of Propebela.

== Distribution ==
This species occurs in the English Channel off France.
