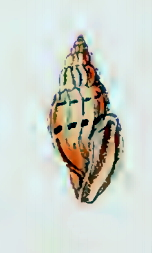
- Original image of a shell of Pyrgocythara astricta

Scientific classification
- Kingdom: Animalia
- Phylum: Mollusca
- Class: Gastropoda
- Subclass: Caenogastropoda
- Order: Neogastropoda
- Superfamily: Conoidea
- Family: Mangeliidae
- Genus: Pyrgocythara
- Species: P. astricta

Binomial name
- Pyrgocythara astricta (Reeve, L.A., 1846)

Synonyms
- Mangelia astricta Reeve, L.A., 1846

= Pyrgocythara astricta =

Species of gastropod

Pyrgocythara astricta, common name the tied mangelia, is a species of sea snail, a marine gastropod mollusk in the family Mangeliidae.

This species is a nomen dubium.

== Description ==
The length of the shell attains 20 mm (0.79 in).

(Original description) The shell is somewhat fusiformly ovate. The spire is rather short, and the sutures are deep. The shell is longitudinally ribbed, with numerous ribs rather close-set. The color of the shell is whitish, encircled with a narrow brown zone.

== Distribution ==
This species occurs off Florida, USA
