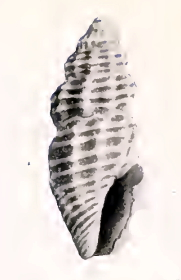
- Original image of a shell of Pyrgocythara helena

Scientific classification
- Kingdom: Animalia
- Phylum: Mollusca
- Class: Gastropoda
- Subclass: Caenogastropoda
- Order: Neogastropoda
- Superfamily: Conoidea
- Family: Mangeliidae
- Genus: Pyrgocythara
- Species: P. helena

Binomial name
- Pyrgocythara helena (Dall, 1919)

Synonyms
- Philbertia helena Dall, 1919

= Pyrgocythara helena =

Species of gastropod

Pyrgocythara helena is a species of sea snail, a marine gastropod mollusk in the family Mangeliidae.

== Description ==
The length of the shell attains 3.5 mm, its diameter 1.25 mm.

(Original description) The minute, solid shell is pale yellowish brown. It is strongly sculptured. The protoconch of about two whorls is low and rapidly increasing. The last one is keeled, otherwise smooth. . The four subsequent whorls show a deeply constricted, not appressed suture. The axial sculpture consists of (on the body whorl seven) strong ribs. These are angulated at the periphery, with subequal deep interspaces, and which are not continuous up the spire. The spiral sculpture consists of on the upper whorl one, on the third two, on the body whorl about seven obscure rounded rather coarse threads with narrower interspaces. The aperture is narrow. The anal sulcus is shallow close to the suture. The outer lip is varicose and smooth within. The inner lip is smooth. The columella is short and straight. The siphonal canal is not differentiated from the aperture.

== Distribution ==
This marine species occurs in the Sea of Cortez, Western Mexico and off Costa Rica .
