= Haedropleura flexicosta =

Scientific classification
- Kingdom: Animalia
- Phylum: Mollusca
- Class: Gastropoda
- Subclass: Caenogastropoda
- Order: Neogastropoda
- Superfamily: Conoidea
- Family: Horaiclavidae
- Genus: Haedropleura
- Species: H. flexicosta

Binomial name
- Haedropleura flexicosta Monterosato, 1884

Species of gastropod

Haedropleura flexicosta is a species of sea snail, a marine gastropod mollusk in the family Horaiclavidae.

It was previously included within the family Turridae.

== Distribution ==
This species occurs in the Mediterranean Sea.
