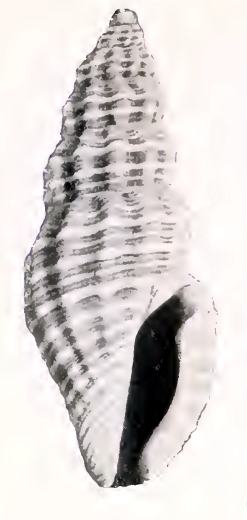
- Original image of a shell of Pyrgocythara scammoni

Scientific classification
- Kingdom: Animalia
- Phylum: Mollusca
- Class: Gastropoda
- Subclass: Caenogastropoda
- Order: Neogastropoda
- Superfamily: Conoidea
- Family: Mangeliidae
- Genus: Pyrgocythara
- Species: P. scammoni

Binomial name
- Pyrgocythara scammoni (Dall, 1919)

Synonyms
- Philbertia scammoni Dall, 1919

= Pyrgocythara scammoni =

Species of gastropod

Pyrgocythara scammoni is a species of sea snail, a marine gastropod mollusk in the family Mangeliidae.

== Description ==
The length of the shell attains 7 mm, its diameter 2.5 mm.

(Original description) The small shell is whitish, with brown interspaces or bands, more or less variable. The protoconch is small, blunt and turbinate. The first whorl is smooth, the third obliquely minutely axially ribbed. The five subsequent whorls show a rather deep suture. The whorls are rounded and uniformly sculptured. The spiral sculpture consists of two kinds. On the spire two major threads near the periphery and four on the body whorl are whiter than the rest of the surface. In the interspaces the threads are much finer. The major threads are hardly swollen where they override the ribs. On the base the sculpture takes the form of about four flattish bands appressed on the anterior edge. On the siphonal canal there are only four or five close-set rounded threads. The axial sculpture consists of (on the body whorl including the terminal varix 10) rounded, rather strong ribs, extending from suture to the siphonal canal and usually vertically continuous up the spire. The shoulder is hardly indicated, the spiral sculpture passing over the ribs without nodulation. The interspaces of the reticulation are usually darker colored than the threads. The aperture is narrow, elongated, with a large rounded and conspicuous anal sulcus. The outer lip is varicose, thick, sharp edged and internally smooth. The inner lip is smooth and not callous. The siphonal canal is short, wide and hardly differentiated from the aperture.

== Distribution ==
This marine species occurs off Baja California, Mexico
