= Pyrgocythara turrispiralata =

Scientific classification
- Kingdom: Animalia
- Phylum: Mollusca
- Class: Gastropoda
- Subclass: Caenogastropoda
- Order: Neogastropoda
- Superfamily: Conoidea
- Family: Mangeliidae
- Genus: Pyrgocythara
- Species: P. turrispiralata

Binomial name
- Pyrgocythara turrispiralata Scarponi & al., 2016

Extinct species of gastropod

Pyrgocythara turrispiralata is an extinct species of sea snail, a marine gastropod mollusc in the family Mangeliidae.

== Description ==
The length of the shell attains 6.3 mm, its diameter is 2.9 mm.

== Distribution ==
Fossils of this marine species were found in Miocene strata of Ukraine; age range: 13.65 to 11.608 Ma.
