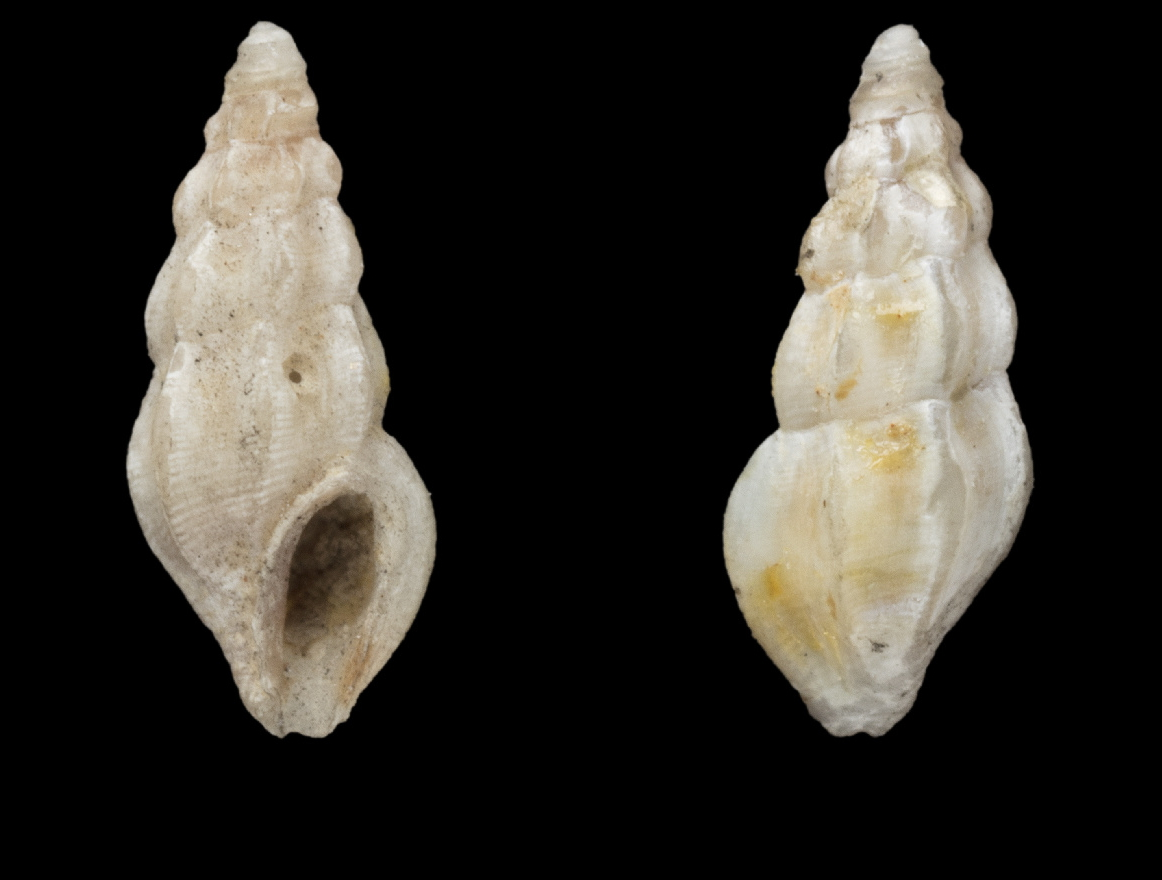
- Shell of Haedropleura pellyi (specimen at the Natural History Museum, London)

Scientific classification
- Kingdom: Animalia
- Phylum: Mollusca
- Class: Gastropoda
- Subclass: Caenogastropoda
- Order: Neogastropoda
- Superfamily: Conoidea
- Family: Horaiclavidae
- Genus: Haedropleura
- Species: H. pellyi

Binomial name
- Haedropleura pellyi (Smith, E.A., 1882)

Synonyms
- Mangilia pellyi Smith E.A., 1882; Pleurotoma (Mangilia) pellyi Smith E.A., 1882

= Haedropleura pellyi =

Species of gastropod

Haedropleura pellyi is a species of sea snail, a marine gastropod mollusk in the family Horaiclavidae.

== Distribution ==
This marine species occurs in the Persian Gulf, off Madagascar, the Andaman and Nicobar Islands, Myanmar, Thailand
