= Tenaturris isiola =

Scientific classification
- Kingdom: Animalia
- Phylum: Mollusca
- Class: Gastropoda
- Subclass: Caenogastropoda
- Order: Neogastropoda
- Superfamily: Conoidea
- Family: Mangeliidae
- Genus: Tenaturris
- Species: †T. isiola

Binomial name
- †Tenaturris isiola Woodring 1928

Extinct species of gastropod

Tenaturris isiola is an extinct species of sea snail, a marine gastropod mollusk in the family Mangeliidae.

== Description ==
The length of the shell attains 9.1 mm, its diameter 3.9 mm.

(Original description) The stout shell is medium-sized. The stout protoconch is cylindrical and consists of about two smooth whorls. The aperture is relatively wide.

The sculpture consists of narrow axial ribs (16 or 17 on penultimate whorl), varicose here and there on the body whorl, weakly overridden by fine spiral threads. Microscopic frosted spirals visible in interspaces.

== Distribution ==
This extinct marine species can be found in Pliocene strata of the Bowden Formation, Jamaica; age range: 3.6 to 2.588 Ma
