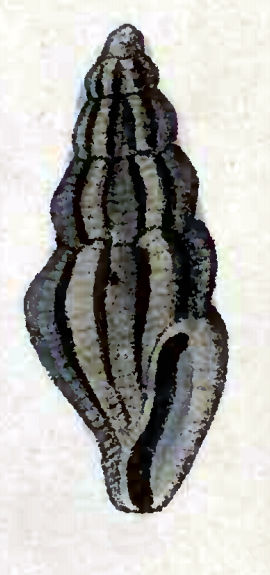
- Shell of Pyrgocythara laqueata

Scientific classification
- Kingdom: Animalia
- Phylum: Mollusca
- Class: Gastropoda
- Subclass: Caenogastropoda
- Order: Neogastropoda
- Superfamily: Conoidea
- Family: Mangeliidae
- Genus: Pyrgocythara
- Species: P. laqueata

Binomial name
- Pyrgocythara laqueata (Reeve, L.A., 1846)

Synonyms
- Mangilia laqueata Reeve, L.A., 1846; Pleurotoma laqueata Reeve, 1846 (original combination)

= Pyrgocythara laqueata =

Species of gastropod

Pyrgocythara laqueata, common name the tied mangelia, is a species of sea snail, a marine gastropod mollusk in the family Mangeliidae.

This is a taxon inquirendum.

== Description ==
The few ribs of the shell are stout and remote. The sinus is not very distinct. The color of the shell is dull white.

== Distribution ==
This species occurs off the West Indies.
