= Pyrgocythara annaclaireleeae =

Scientific classification
- Kingdom: Animalia
- Phylum: Mollusca
- Class: Gastropoda
- Subclass: Caenogastropoda
- Order: Neogastropoda
- Superfamily: Conoidea
- Family: Mangeliidae
- Genus: Pyrgocythara
- Species: P. annaclaireleeae

Binomial name
- Pyrgocythara annaclaireleeae (García, 2008)

Synonyms
- Acmaturris annaclaireleeae García, 2008 (original combination)

Species of gastropod

Pyrgocythara annaclaireleeae is a species of sea snail, a marine gastropod mollusk in the family Mangeliidae.

== Distribution ==
This species occurs in the western Atlantic Ocean off The Bahamas.
