= Tenaturris verdensis =

Scientific classification
- Kingdom: Animalia
- Phylum: Mollusca
- Class: Gastropoda
- Subclass: Caenogastropoda
- Order: Neogastropoda
- Superfamily: Conoidea
- Family: Mangeliidae
- Genus: Tenaturris
- Species: T. verdensis

Binomial name
- Tenaturris verdensis (W. H. Dall, 1919)

Synonyms
- Cytharella verdensis Dall, 1919 (original combination); Tenaturris burchi Hertlein, L.G. & A.M. Strong, 1951

Species of gastropod

Tenaturris verdensis is a species of sea snail, a marine gastropod mollusk in the family Mangeliidae.

== Description ==
The length of the shell varies between 6.5 mm and 16 mm.

(Original description) The small shell has a short- fusiform shape. It is whitish or feebly dotted with brown, with three brown whorls in the protoconch and four subsequent whorls. The apex of the protoconch is very small, smooth, the other two microscopically rugose. The suture is appressed behind a faint anal fasciole. The whorls are moderately rounded. The spiral sculpture is uniform, consisting of fine attenuated close-set spiral threads covering the whole surface and crossed by minutely sharp incremental lines giving a peculiarly rough effect. The other axial sculpture consists of (on the body whorl about 12) rather feeble rounded ribs obsolete anteriorly with about equal interspaces. The aperture is elongate, narrow with no differentiated siphonal canal. The outer lip is moderately varicose, sharp edged and smooth within. The anal sulcus is rounded, shallow and close to the suture.

== Distribution ==
This species occurs in the Sea of Cortez, Western Mexico
