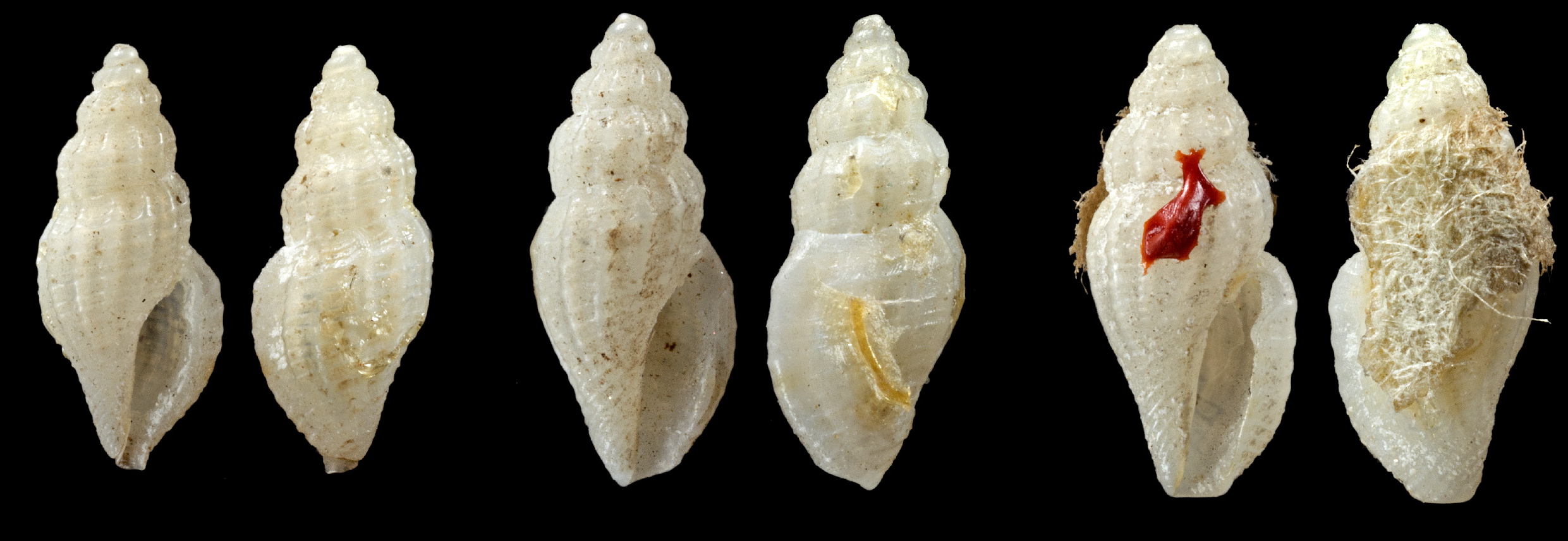
- Shell of Tenaturris fulgens (specimen at the Natural History Museum, London)

Scientific classification
- Kingdom: Animalia
- Phylum: Mollusca
- Class: Gastropoda
- Subclass: Caenogastropoda
- Order: Neogastropoda
- Superfamily: Conoidea
- Family: Mangeliidae
- Genus: Tenaturris
- Species: T. fulgens

Binomial name
- Tenaturris fulgens (E.A. Smith, 1888)

Synonyms
- Pleurotoma (Mangilia) fulgens E.A. Smith, 1888

= Tenaturris fulgens =

Species of gastropod

Tenaturris fulgens is a species of sea snail, a marine gastropod mollusk in the family Mangeliidae.

== Description ==
The length of the shell attains 7 mm, its diameter 2 mm.

The ovate shell has a shining aspect. It is white. The pale dot on the last rib is so small and indistinct that it might easily be overlooked. The protoconch consists of two smooth, convex whorls. These are followed by slightly convex whorls showing 11-12 longitudinal ribs that continue in the body whorl almost to the base of the shell. The uppermost of the three or four chief spiral lirations is situated a little above the middle of the whorls, and it is at this point that they appear to be slightly angulated. These spiral liration number 16–18 in the body whorl. The ovate aperture is narrow and measures about half the total length. The outer lip is incrassate and is arched forward at its top. The inner lip is simple. The columella is slightly callous. The siphonal canal is short and narrow.

== Distribution ==
This species occurs in the Atlantic Ocean off Brazil
