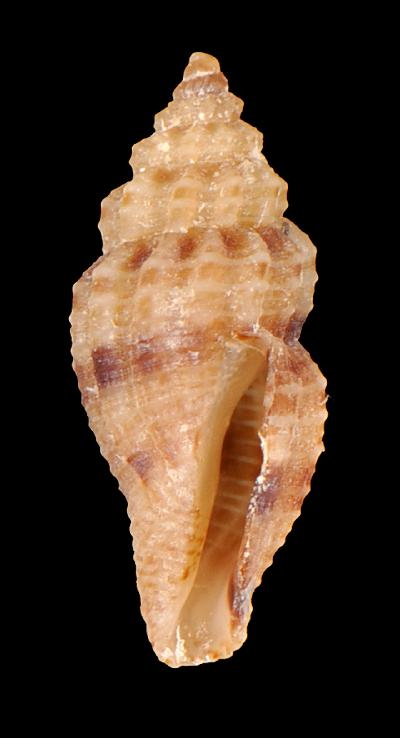
- Shell of Tenaturris dysoni; museum specimen at MNHN, Paris

Scientific classification
- Kingdom: Animalia
- Phylum: Mollusca
- Class: Gastropoda
- Subclass: Caenogastropoda
- Order: Neogastropoda
- Superfamily: Conoidea
- Family: Mangeliidae
- Genus: Tenaturris
- Species: T. dysoni

Binomial name
- Tenaturris dysoni (Reeve, 1846)

Synonyms
- Drillia dysoni (Reeve, 1846); Kurtziella macula Nowell-Usticke, G.W., 1969; Mangelia dysoni Reeve, 1846 (original description)

= Tenaturris dysoni =

Species of gastropod

Tenaturris dysoni, common name Dyson's mangelia, is a species of sea snail, a marine gastropod mollusk in the family Mangeliidae.

== Description ==
The length of the shell varies between 5 mm and 12 mm.

(Original description) The ovate shell has a rather short spire. The whorls are rounded at the upper part, longitudinally very closely finely ribbed, decussated with transverse striae. The ribs, being decussated with striae, have a slightly granular appearance. The sinus is broad. The siphonal canal is almosty lacking. The color of the shell is whitish, encircled with two faint bands of orange brown.

== Distribution ==
This species occurs in the Caribbean Sea off Honduras, Colombia and in the Lesser Antilles.
