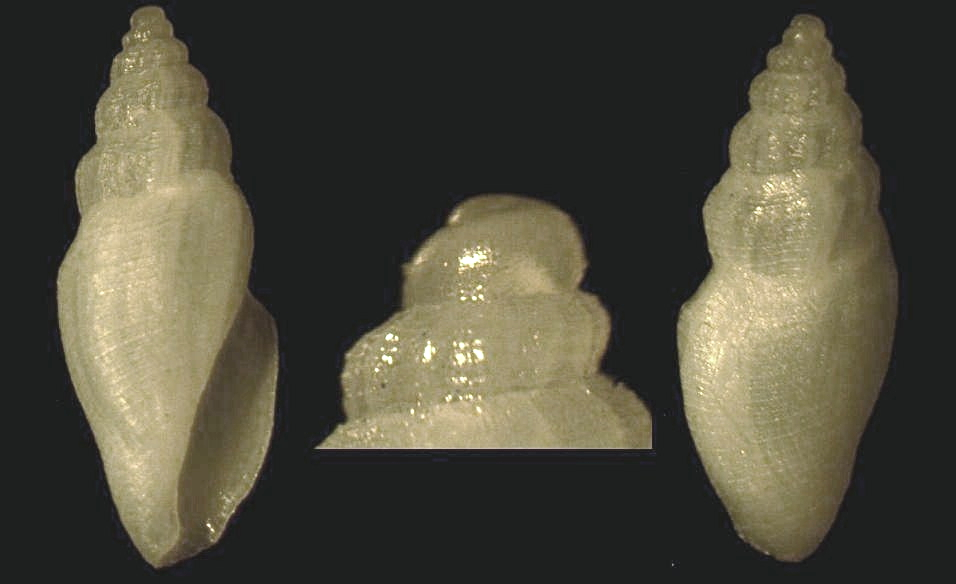
- Shell (and protoconch) of Tenaturris inepta

Scientific classification
- Kingdom: Animalia
- Phylum: Mollusca
- Class: Gastropoda
- Subclass: Caenogastropoda
- Order: Neogastropoda
- Superfamily: Conoidea
- Family: Mangeliidae
- Genus: Tenaturris
- Species: T. inepta

Binomial name
- Tenaturris inepta (E. A. Smith, 1882)

Synonyms
- Pleurotoma inepta Smith E. A., 1882

= Tenaturris inepta =

Species of gastropod

Tenaturris inepta is a species of sea snail, a marine gastropod mollusk in the family Mangeliidae.

== Distribution ==
T. inepta can be found in Atlantic waters, ranging from the eastern coast of Florida south to Brazil and surrounding Bermuda.; in the Caribbean Sea, the Gulf of Mexico and the Lesser Antilles.
