= Haedropleura maitreja =

Scientific classification
- Kingdom: Animalia
- Phylum: Mollusca
- Class: Gastropoda
- Subclass: Caenogastropoda
- Order: Neogastropoda
- Superfamily: Conoidea
- Family: Horaiclavidae
- Genus: Haedropleura
- Species: H. maitreja

Binomial name
- Haedropleura maitreja (A. von Koenen, 1872 )

Extinct species of gastropod

Haedropleura maitreja is an extinct species of sea snail, a marine gastropod mollusk in the family Horaiclavidae.

== Description ==
The length of the shell attains 7.5 mm.

== Distribution ==
This extinct species occurs in Miocene strata of Belgium, Denmark, and Germany.
