= Pyrgocythara eminula =

Scientific classification
- Kingdom: Animalia
- Phylum: Mollusca
- Class: Gastropoda
- Subclass: Caenogastropoda
- Order: Neogastropoda
- Superfamily: Conoidea
- Family: Mangeliidae
- Genus: Pyrgocythara
- Species: P. eminula

Binomial name
- Pyrgocythara eminula W.P. Woodring, 1928

Extinct species of gastropod

Pyrgocythara eminula is an extinct species of sea snail, a marine gastropod mollusk in the family Mangeliidae.

== Description ==
The shell of Pyrgocythara eminula is relatively small, with a length reaching up to 4.3 mm and a diameter of about 1.8 mm. The shell is likely elongate and turreted, consistent with the characteristics of the family Mangeliidae.

== Distribution ==
Fossils of this marine species were found in Pleistocene strata of Jamaica and St. Thomas; age range: 3.6 to 2.588 Ma
