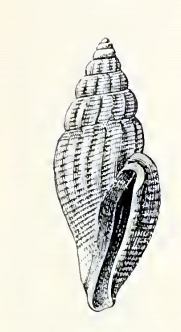
- Shell of † Tenaturris guppyi

Scientific classification
- Kingdom: Animalia
- Phylum: Mollusca
- Class: Gastropoda
- Subclass: Caenogastropoda
- Order: Neogastropoda
- Superfamily: Conoidea
- Family: Mangeliidae
- Genus: Tenaturris
- Species: †T. guppyi

Binomial name
- †Tenaturris guppyi (W. H. Dall 1896 )

Synonyms
- † Cythara guppyi W. H. Dall, 1896

= Tenaturris guppyi =

Extinct species of gastropod

Tenaturris guppyi is an extinct species of sea snail, a marine gastropod mollusk in the family Mangeliidae.

== Description ==
The length of the shell attains 6.7 mm, its diameter 2.8 mm.

The stout shell is medium-sized. The protoconch and the aperture as described under the genus.

The sculpture consists of narrow axial ribs (about 16 on penultimate whorl), generally varicose here and there on the body whorl, weakly overridden by fine spiral threads, which are weaker and more closely spaced on anal fasciole. Between the threads lie microscopic frosted spirals.

== Distribution ==
This extinct marine species can be found in Pliocene strata of the Bowden Formation, Jamaica; age range: 3.6 to 2.588 Ma
