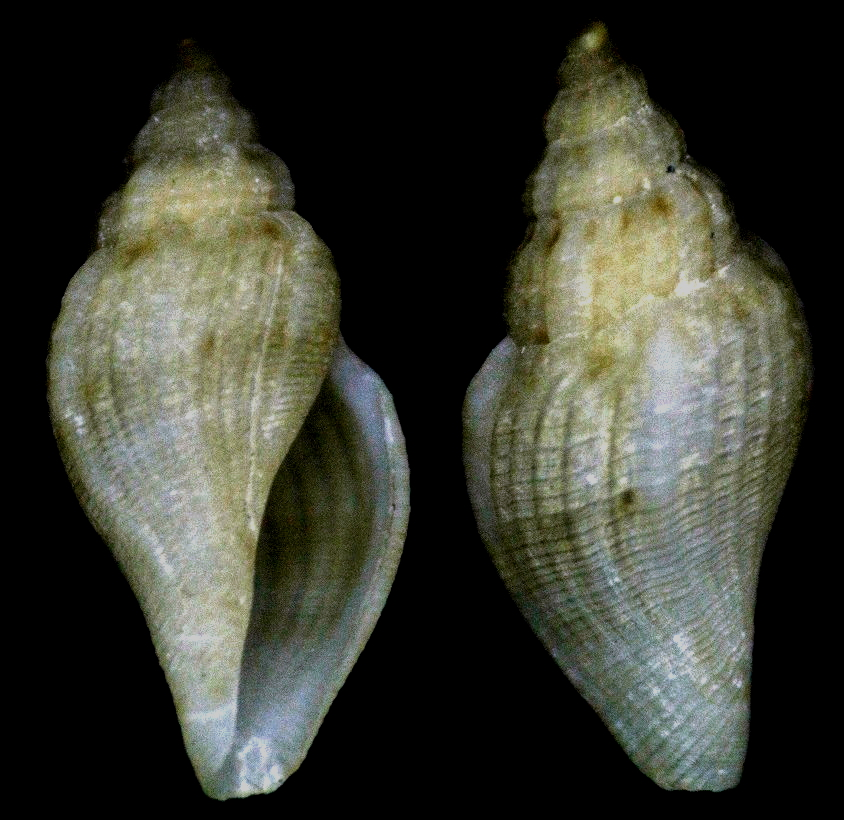
- Shells of Tenaturris bartlettii

Scientific classification
- Kingdom: Animalia
- Phylum: Mollusca
- Class: Gastropoda
- Subclass: Caenogastropoda
- Order: Neogastropoda
- Superfamily: Conoidea
- Family: Mangeliidae
- Genus: Tenaturris
- Species: T. bartlettii

Binomial name
- Tenaturris bartlettii (Dall, 1889)

Synonyms
- Cythara bartlettii (Dall, 1889); Mangilia bartlettii Dall, 1889; Mangilia (Cythara) bartlettii Dall, 1889 (basionym)

= Tenaturris bartlettii =

Species of gastropod

Tenaturris bartlettii is a species of sea snail, a marine gastropod mollusk in the family Mangeliidae.

== Description ==
The length of the shell varies between 7 mm and 13 mm.

(Original description) The oval shell has a rather acute spire. The protoconch is glassy, dark brown and is inflated. It consists of 1½ whorls, followed by five normal whorls. The color of the shell is pale yellowish, with irregular touches of pale brown especially on the varix . The spiral sculpture consists of numerous fine subequal rounded little-raised threads, with wider interspaces, covering the whole shell and stronger on the siphonal canal. The transverse sculpture consists of extremely fine close parallel hardly raised incremental lines, visible only with the glass, and traversing the spiral interspaces with great regularity and perfect uniformity. It also shows on the antepenultimate whorl about twenty narrow, little raised, long rounded riblets, starting from the suture and fading away on the base. The spirals run smoothly over the ribs. The fasciole is only visible in the curve of the incremental lines. The notch is narrow, rounded and not deep. The outer lip is reinforced in the adult by a rather thick rounded varix from which the thin sharp edge of the lip stands out prominently, arched forward in the middle, and is not contracted for the siphonal canal. The inner lip is simple. The columella is obliquely trimmed off in front, but is otherwise straight. The siphonal canal is short, wide and not differentiated from the aperture.

== Distribution ==
This species occurs in the Caribbean Sea off Colombia, Belize, the Cayman Islands and Cuba, also off Key West, Florida, United States.
