= Pyrgocythara nodulosa =

Scientific classification
- Kingdom: Animalia
- Phylum: Mollusca
- Class: Gastropoda
- Subclass: Caenogastropoda
- Order: Neogastropoda
- Superfamily: Conoidea
- Family: Mangeliidae
- Genus: Pyrgocythara
- Species: P. nodulosa

Binomial name
- Pyrgocythara nodulosa Sysoev & Ivanov, 1985

Species of gastropod

Pyrgocythara nodulosa is a species of sea snail, a marine gastropod mollusk in the family Mangeliidae.

== Distribution ==
This marine species occurs in the Naska Ridge, Southeast Pacific
