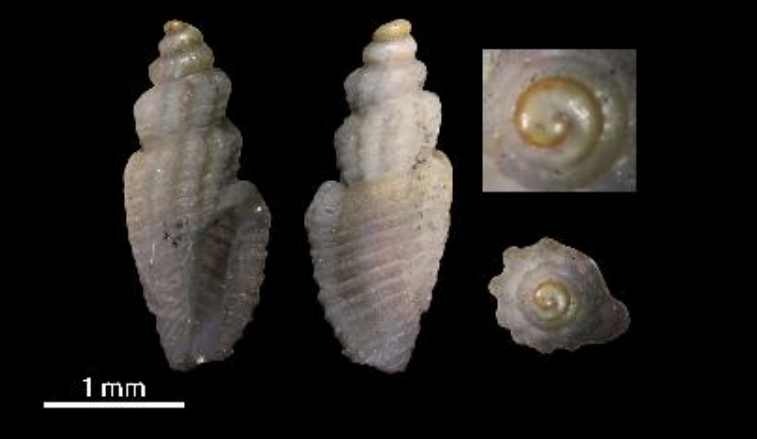
- Shell (with protoconch) of Pyrgocythara juliocesari

Scientific classification
- Kingdom: Animalia
- Phylum: Mollusca
- Class: Gastropoda
- Subclass: Caenogastropoda
- Order: Neogastropoda
- Superfamily: Conoidea
- Family: Mangeliidae
- Genus: Pyrgocythara
- Species: P. juliocesari

Binomial name
- Pyrgocythara juliocesari Fernández-Garcés & Rolán, 2010

= Pyrgocythara juliocesari =

Species of gastropod

Pyrgocythara juliocesari is a species of sea snail, a marine gastropod mollusk in the family Mangeliidae.

== Description ==
The length of the shell attains 2.5mm.

== Distribution ==
This marine species occurs off Cuba at depths between 30 m and 54 m.
