= Pyrgocythara subdiaphana =

Scientific classification
- Kingdom: Animalia
- Phylum: Mollusca
- Class: Gastropoda
- Subclass: Caenogastropoda
- Order: Neogastropoda
- Superfamily: Conoidea
- Family: Mangeliidae
- Genus: Pyrgocythara
- Species: P. subdiaphana

Binomial name
- Pyrgocythara subdiaphana (Carpenter, 1864)

Synonyms
- Mangelia subdiaphana Carpenter, 1864

Species of gastropod

Pyrgocythara subdiaphana is a species of sea snail, a marine gastropod mollusk in the family Mangeliidae.

== Description ==
The length of the shell attains 5 mm.

== Distribution ==
This marine species was found off Cabo San Lucas, Baja California, Mexico.
