= Haedropleura continua =

Scientific classification
- Kingdom: Animalia
- Phylum: Mollusca
- Class: Gastropoda
- Subclass: Caenogastropoda
- Order: Neogastropoda
- Superfamily: Conoidea
- Family: Horaiclavidae
- Genus: Haedropleura
- Species: H. continua

Binomial name
- Haedropleura continua (Melvill, J.C. & R. Standen, 1903)

Synonyms
- Drillia continua Melvill, J.C. & R. Standen, 1903

Species of gastropod

Haedropleura continua is a species of sea snail, a marine gastropod mollusk in the family Horaiclavidae.

== Description ==
The length of the fusiform shell attains 10 mm, its diameter 3.75 mm. It contains 10½ whorls, of which 1½ in the protoconch.

This species is conspicuous for its exactly continuous longitudinal ribs, those of whorl succeeding whorl descending in a perfectly straight line to the base. These whorls are slightly once-angled beyond the centre. The whole surface is white, with a slight ochreous tinge, and smooth

== Distribution ==
This species occurs in the Persian Gulf.
