= Haedropleura summa =

Scientific classification
- Kingdom: Animalia
- Phylum: Mollusca
- Class: Gastropoda
- Subclass: Caenogastropoda
- Order: Neogastropoda
- Superfamily: Conoidea
- Family: Horaiclavidae
- Genus: Haedropleura
- Species: H. summa

Binomial name
- Haedropleura summa Kilburn, 1988

Species of gastropod

Haedropleura summa is a species of sea snail, a marine gastropod mollusk in the family Horaiclavidae.

It was previously included within the family Turridae.

== Description ==
The length of the shell attains 12.7 mm.

== Distribution ==
This marine species occurs off KwaZulu-Natal, South Africa
