= Haedropleura miocaenica =

Scientific classification
- Kingdom: Animalia
- Phylum: Mollusca
- Class: Gastropoda
- Subclass: Caenogastropoda
- Order: Neogastropoda
- Superfamily: Conoidea
- Family: Horaiclavidae
- Genus: Haedropleura
- Species: H. miocaenica

Binomial name
- Haedropleura miocaenica (Boettger, 1902)

Synonyms
- † Donovania miocaenica Boettger, 1902 (original combination)

Extinct species of gastropod

Haedropleura miocaenica is an extinct species of sea snail, a marine gastropod mollusk in the family Horaiclavidae. This species may actually belong to Anacithara This species may actually belong to Anacithara
