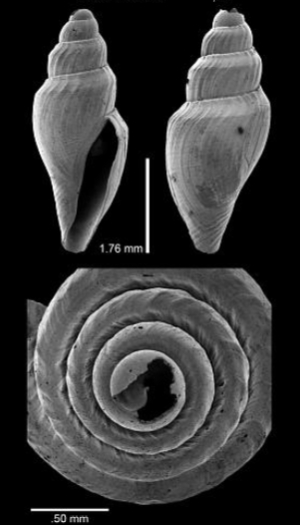
- Shell and protoconch of Tenaturris epomis (holotype at the Smithsonian Institution)

Scientific classification
- Kingdom: Animalia
- Phylum: Mollusca
- Class: Gastropoda
- Subclass: Caenogastropoda
- Order: Neogastropoda
- Superfamily: Conoidea
- Family: Mangeliidae
- Genus: Tenaturris
- Species: T. epomis

Binomial name
- Tenaturris epomis (Dall, 1927)

Synonyms
- Daphnella epomis Dall, 1927

= Tenaturris epomis =

Species of gastropod

Tenaturris epomis is a species of sea snail, a marine gastropod mollusk in the family Mangeliidae.

== Description ==
The length of the shell attains 6.3 mm, its diameter 2 mm.

(Original description) The minute, slender shell is white. The small, smooth protoconch consists of about one whorl, and three subsequent whorls. The suture is distinct, not appressed. The fasciole in front of it flattish, the anterior margin of the fasciole forming a more or less angular shoulder to the whorl. The axial sculpture consists of very fine incremental lines and at and near the shoulder of feeble fine flexuous wrinkles, stronger on the spire. The spiral sculpture consists of very fine close striae over the whole surface except a few threads on the siphonal canal. The body whorl equals about two-thirds the whole length. The aperture is narrow. The siphonal canal is hardly differentiated. The outer lip (immature?) is thin and sharp. The anal sulcus is obscure. The columella is straight, attenuated in front, its axis impervious.

== Distribution ==
This species occurs in the Atlantic Ocean between Georgia and Florida, USA.
