= Tenaturris terpna =

Scientific classification
- Kingdom: Animalia
- Phylum: Mollusca
- Class: Gastropoda
- Subclass: Caenogastropoda
- Order: Neogastropoda
- Superfamily: Conoidea
- Family: Mangeliidae
- Genus: Tenaturris
- Species: †T. terpna

Binomial name
- †Tenaturris terpna Woodring 1928

Extinct species of gastropod

Tenaturris terpna is an extinct species of sea snail, a marine gastropod mollusk in the family Mangeliidae.

== Description ==
The length of the shell attains 9.1 mm, its diameter 3.6 mm.

(Original description) The medium-sized shell is moderately stout. The protoconch is as described under the genus. The anal notch is relatively shallow.

The sculpture consists of axial ribs, weakly overridden by fine spiral threads. The axials of the first three whorls are relatively broad and far apart, those on remaining whorls narrow and more closely spaced (23 on the body whorl). Interspaces bear microscopic frosted spirals.

== Distribution ==
This extinct marine species can be found in Pliocene strata of the Bowden Formation, Jamaica; age range: 3.6 to 2.588 Ma
