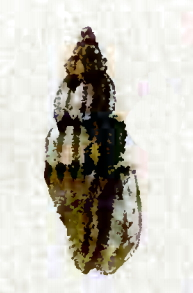
- Shell of Pyrgocythara albovittata

Scientific classification
- Kingdom: Animalia
- Phylum: Mollusca
- Class: Gastropoda
- Subclass: Caenogastropoda
- Order: Neogastropoda
- Superfamily: Conoidea
- Family: Mangeliidae
- Genus: Pyrgocythara
- Species: P. albovittata

Binomial name
- Pyrgocythara albovittata (Adams C. B., 1845)

Synonyms
- Mangelia luteofasciata Reeve, L.A., 1845; Pleurotoma albovittata Adams C. B., 1845 (original combination); Pyrgocythara luteofasciata (L.A. Reeve, 1845)

= Pyrgocythara albovittata =

Species of gastropod

Pyrgocythara albovittata is a species of sea snail, a marine gastropod mollusk in the family Mangeliidae.

== Description ==
The length of the shell varies between 4 mm and 6.4 mm.

The orange-banded shell is ovately oblong. The whorls have a narrow shoulder. They are longitudinally strongly ribbed with white, obtuse ribs close-set.

This species was described and figured by Reeve a few months later, under the name of Mangilia luteofasciata, and without locality.

== Distribution ==
This species occurs in the Caribbean Sea and the Lesser Antilles.
