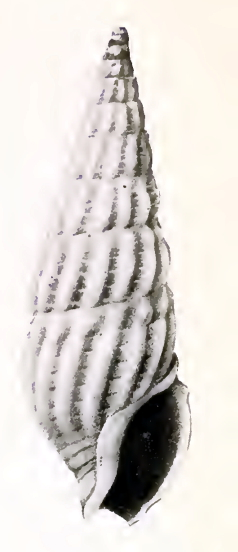
- Shell of Pyrgocythara hemphilli

Scientific classification
- Kingdom: Animalia
- Phylum: Mollusca
- Class: Gastropoda
- Subclass: Caenogastropoda
- Order: Neogastropoda
- Superfamily: Conoidea
- Family: Mangeliidae
- Genus: Pyrgocythara
- Species: P. hemphilli

Binomial name
- Pyrgocythara hemphilli Bartsch & Rehder, 1939

Synonyms
- Elaeocyma arbela Dall, W.H., 1919

= Pyrgocythara hemphilli =

Species of gastropod

Pyrgocythara hemphilli is a species of sea snail, a marine gastropod mollusk in the family Mangeliidae.

== Description ==
The length of the shell attains 8 mm (0.31 in).

The small, glistening, acute shell is brownish, with the projecting sculpture paler. The protoconch is dark brown, glassy, and rather irregularly coiled. It contains one smooth whorl followed by a peripherally keeled turn and about eight subsequent whorls. The suture is distinct, appressed, with a nodulose band in front of it where the ends of the ribs are cut off by a very narrow fasciolar constriction. The spiral sculpture consists of a few incised lines cutting only the interspaces between the ribs, on the spire. On the body whorl there are six or seven of these lines, with much wider interspaces, followed by three strong cords close-set on the siphonal canal. The axial sculpture consists of (on the body whorl about 13) protractively oblique whitish narrow ribs extending from the fasciole to the cords of the siphonal canal, with subequal interspaces and not continuous up the spire. The silky incremental lines are evident. The aperture is narrow. The anal sulcus is deep and rounded, with a strong subsutural callus. The outer lip is sharp-edged, with a feeble varix and a brown spot behind it. The inner lip and the columella show a thick coat of white enamel, the throat not lirate. The siphonal canal is constricted, very short, deep, and slightly recurved.

== Distribution ==
P. hemphilli can be found in Caribbean waters, ranging from the western coast of Florida to the Bahamas.
