= Pyrgocythara urceolata =

Scientific classification
- Kingdom: Animalia
- Phylum: Mollusca
- Class: Gastropoda
- Subclass: Caenogastropoda
- Order: Neogastropoda
- Superfamily: Conoidea
- Family: Mangeliidae
- Genus: Pyrgocythara
- Species: P. urceolata

Binomial name
- Pyrgocythara urceolata Rolán & Otero-Schmitt, 1999

Species of gastropod

Pyrgocythara urceolata is a species of sea snail, a marine gastropod mollusk in the family Mangeliidae.

== Description ==
The length of the shell attains 7 mm.

== Distribution ==
This species occurs in the Atlantic Ocean off the Cape Verdes and Angola.
