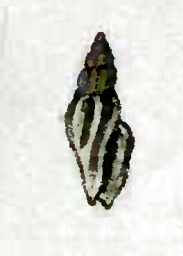
- Shell of Tenaturris merita

Scientific classification
- Kingdom: Animalia
- Phylum: Mollusca
- Class: Gastropoda
- Subclass: Caenogastropoda
- Order: Neogastropoda
- Superfamily: Conoidea
- Family: Mangeliidae
- Genus: Tenaturris
- Species: T. merita

Binomial name
- Tenaturris merita (Hinds, 1843)

Synonyms
- Clavatula merita Hinds, 1843; Cytharella merita (Hinds, 1843); Tenaturris nereis Pilsbry, H.A. & H.N. Lowe, 1932

= Tenaturris merita =

Species of gastropod

Tenaturris merita is a species of sea snail, a marine gastropod mollusk in the family Mangeliidae.

== Description ==
The length of the shell varies between 7 mm and 12 mm.

The acuminate ovate-turreted shell contains 6 smooth whorls. It is shortly plicately ribbed, transversely striated, angulated next the simple suture. The outer lip is sharp. The aperture is oblong. The siphonal canal is almost non-existent. Its color is yellowish, the back of body whorl is clouded with brown, with a brown line on the shoulder-angle.

== Distribution ==
This species occurs in the Pacific Ocean, between Monterey, California and Costa Rica
