= Haedropleura orientalis =

Scientific classification
- Kingdom: Animalia
- Phylum: Mollusca
- Class: Gastropoda
- Subclass: Caenogastropoda
- Order: Neogastropoda
- Superfamily: Conoidea
- Family: Horaiclavidae
- Genus: Haedropleura
- Species: H. orientalis

Binomial name
- Haedropleura orientalis Vredenburg 1923

Synonyms
- † Bela (Haedropleura) orientalis Vredenburg 1923

Extinct species of gastropod

Haedropleura orientalis is an extinct species of sea snail, a marine gastropod mollusk in the family Horaiclavidae.

== Description ==
The length of the shell attains 33.7 mm.

== Distribution ==
This extinct species occurs in Paleocene strata of India; age range: 58.7 to 55.8 Ma
