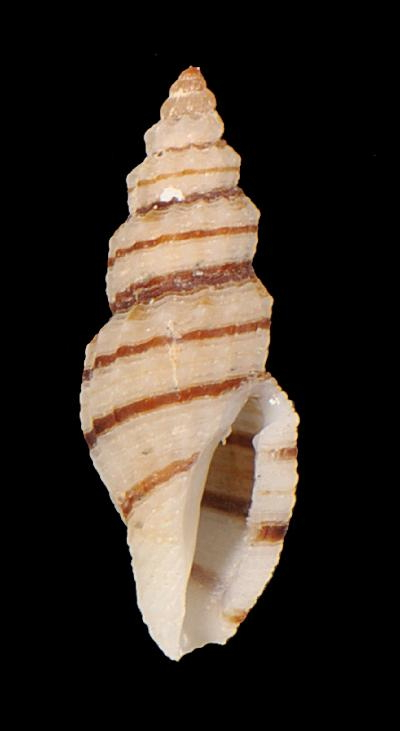
- Shell of Tenaturris trilineata; museum specimen at MNHN, Paris

Scientific classification
- Kingdom: Animalia
- Phylum: Mollusca
- Class: Gastropoda
- Subclass: Caenogastropoda
- Order: Neogastropoda
- Superfamily: Conoidea
- Family: Mangeliidae
- Genus: Tenaturris
- Species: T. trilineata

Binomial name
- Tenaturris trilineata (C. B. Adams, 1845)

Synonyms
- Agathotoma trilineata (Adams C.B., 1845); Cryoturris trilineata (C. B. Adams, 1845); Mangilia trilineata (Adams C.B., 1845); Pleurotoma trilineata Adams C. B., 1845 (original combination); Pleurotoma trifasciata Reeve, L.A., 1845

= Tenaturris trilineata =

Species of gastropod

Tenaturris trilineata is a species of sea snail, a marine gastropod mollusk in the family Mangeliidae.

== Description ==
The length of the shell attains 6.5 mm.

The shell is narrowly shouldered and contains 6½ whorls. It shows small, close, numerous longitudinal ribs and impressed revolving striae. Its color is whitish, with three narrow brown bands, one of which appears on the spire whorls. The outer lip is thick. The sinus is deep. The siphonal canal is very short.

== Distribution ==
T. trilineata can be found in Atlantic Ocean and Caribbean Sea waters, ranging from the Campeche Bank to Colombia and the Virgin Islands.; in the Caribbean Sea, the Gulf of Mexico and the Lesser Antilles.
