= Pyrgocythara emeryi =

Scientific classification
- Kingdom: Animalia
- Phylum: Mollusca
- Class: Gastropoda
- Subclass: Caenogastropoda
- Order: Neogastropoda
- Superfamily: Conoidea
- Family: Mangeliidae
- Genus: Pyrgocythara
- Species: P. emeryi

Binomial name
- Pyrgocythara emeryi Fargo, 1953

Species of gastropod

Pyrgocythara emeryi is a species of sea snail, a marine gastropod mollusk in the family Mangeliidae.

== Description ==
The length of the shell attains 6 mm.

== Distribution ==
This marine species occurs off the Virgin Islands (?).
