= Pyrgocythara dubia =

Scientific classification
- Kingdom: Animalia
- Phylum: Mollusca
- Class: Gastropoda
- Subclass: Caenogastropoda
- Order: Neogastropoda
- Superfamily: Conoidea
- Family: Mangeliidae
- Genus: Pyrgocythara
- Species: P. dubia

Binomial name
- Pyrgocythara dubia (Adams C. B., 1845)

Synonyms
- Pleurotoma dubia Adams C. B., 1845 (original combination); Tenaturris dubia (C. B. Adams, 1845)

Species of gastropod

Pyrgocythara dubia is a species of sea snail, a marine gastropod mollusk in the family Mangeliidae.

== Distribution ==
This marine species occurs off Jamaica.
