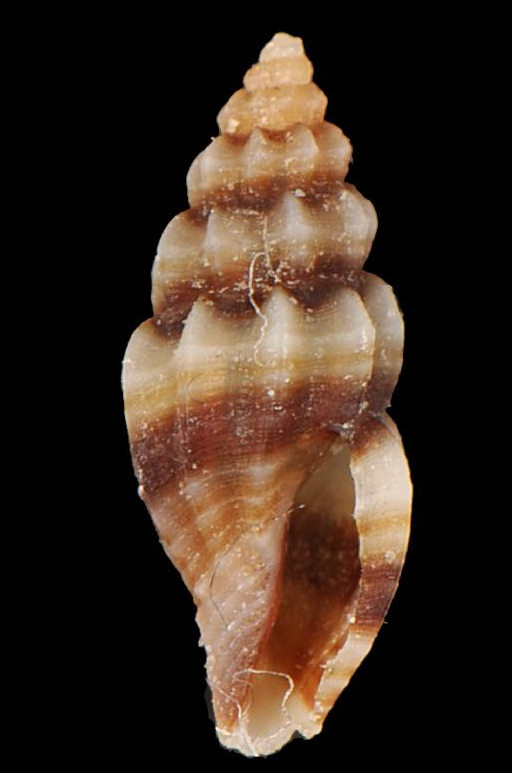
- Shell of Pyrgocythara cinctella (museum specimen at Mnhn, Paris)

Scientific classification
- Kingdom: Animalia
- Phylum: Mollusca
- Class: Gastropoda
- Subclass: Caenogastropoda
- Order: Neogastropoda
- Superfamily: Conoidea
- Family: Mangeliidae
- Genus: Pyrgocythara
- Species: P. cinctella

Binomial name
- Pyrgocythara cinctella (Pfeiffer, 1840)

Synonyms
- Daphnella fusca (C. B. Adams, 1845); Mangelia fusca (C. B. Adams, 1845); Mangilia fusca (C. B. Adams, 1845); Pleurotoma caribaea d'Orbigny, 1847 (original combination); Pleurotoma fusca C. B. Adams, 1845; Pyrgocythara caribaea (d'Orbigny, 1847); Pyrgocythara fusca (C. B. Adams, 1845); Tenaturris fusca (C. B. Adams, 1845)

= Pyrgocythara cinctella =

Species of gastropod

Pyrgocythara cinctella is a species of sea snail, a marine gastropod mollusk in the family Mangeliidae.

== Description ==
The length of the shell attains 4.9 mm.

== Distribution ==
P. cinctella can be found in Atlantic waters, ranging from the coast of Campeche to Brazil; in the Caribbean Sea, the Gulf of Mexico and the Lesser Antilles.
