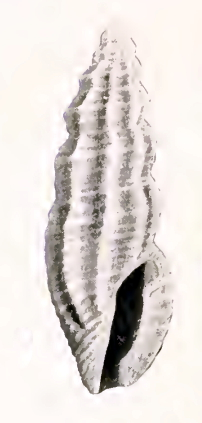
- Original image of a shell of Pyrgocythara melita

Scientific classification
- Kingdom: Animalia
- Phylum: Mollusca
- Class: Gastropoda
- Subclass: Caenogastropoda
- Order: Neogastropoda
- Superfamily: Conoidea
- Family: Mangeliidae
- Genus: Pyrgocythara
- Species: P. melita

Binomial name
- Pyrgocythara melita (Dall, 1919)

Synonyms
- Crockerella hilli Hertlein, L.G. & A.M. Strong, 1951; Haedropleura melita Dall, 1919

= Pyrgocythara melita =

Species of gastropod

Pyrgocythara melita is a species of sea snail, a marine gastropod mollusk in the family Mangeliidae.

== Description ==
The length of the shell attains 5.2 mm, its diameter 2 mm.

(Original description) The small, slender shell is waxen white, with an obscure purple band in front of the suture and the region of the siphonal canal dark purple, when fresh. The protoconch consists of 2½ gradually enlarging whorls, the first smooth, the last more or less axially minutely ribbed. The teleoconch contains five subsequent whorls. The axial sculpture consists of (on the body whorl) eight rather sharp ribs extending from the suture (which they undulate) to the region of the siphonal canal and continuous up the spire in a direct line with somewhat wider interspaces. The suture is distinct and appressed. The spiral sculpture consists of fine uniform evenly spaced rounded threads, not swollen where they cross the ribs. A single thread at the shoulder is more prominent but not larger than the others, from which and from the suture it is separated by a space devoid of the spiral sculpture which elsewhere covers the surface. The ribs are shortly arcuate when passing over the otherwise obscure anal fasciole, and the depressions between them, the suture and the shoulder are markedly excavated. The aperture is narrow. The anal sulcus is conspicuous, rounded and not deep. The outer lip is strongly varicose, not internally lirate. The inner lip is smooth. The columella is short and straight. The siphonal canal is short, hardly differentiated from the aperture.

== Distribution ==
This marine species occurs in the Sea of Cortez, Western Mexico
