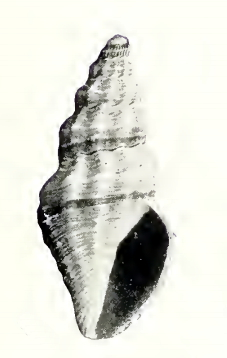
- Original image of a shell of Pyrgocythara danae

Scientific classification
- Kingdom: Animalia
- Phylum: Mollusca
- Class: Gastropoda
- Subclass: Caenogastropoda
- Order: Neogastropoda
- Superfamily: Conoidea
- Family: Mangeliidae
- Genus: Pyrgocythara
- Species: P. danae

Binomial name
- Pyrgocythara danae (Dall, 1919)

Synonyms
- Crockerella pederseni Hertlein, L.G. & A.M. Strong, 1951; Mangilia (Kurtziella) danae Dall, 1919

= Pyrgocythara danae =

Species of gastropod

Pyrgocythara danae is a species of sea snail, a marine gastropod mollusk in the family Mangeliidae.

== Description ==
The length of the shell attains 4.5 mm, its diameter 1.7 mm.

(Original description) The minute shell is whitish, with a narrow brown band below the periphery in front of which the suture is laid. The protoconch is small with 1½ polished whorls followed by 4½ sculptured whorls. The suture is distinct, undulated not appressed. The spiral sculpture consists of a strong cord at the periphery angulating the whorls, with smaller threads (sometimes alternated) covering the rest of the surface with about equal interspaces. The axial sculpture consists of (on the body whorl 10) slightly sigmoid ribs, widest at the periphery, reaching the suture and fading out on the base, with narrower interspaces. On the obscure anal fasciole the interspaces are markedly concave. The aperture is narrow. The anal sulcus is wide and shallow. The outer lip is varicose. The inner lip is smooth. The columbella is straight. The siphonal canal is hardly differentiated.

== Distribution ==
This marine species occurs in the Sea of Cortez, Western Mexico
