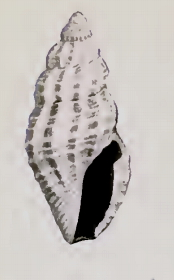
- Original image of a shell of Notocytharella phaethusa

Scientific classification
- Kingdom: Animalia
- Phylum: Mollusca
- Class: Gastropoda
- Subclass: Caenogastropoda
- Order: Neogastropoda
- Superfamily: Conoidea
- Family: Mangeliidae
- Genus: Notocytharella
- Species: N. phaethusa

Binomial name
- Notocytharella phaethusa (Dall, 1919)

Synonyms
- Cytharella phaethusa Dall, 1919 (original combination); Mangelia phaethusa (Dall, 1919); Pyrgocythara phaethusa (Dall, 1919); Tenaturris phaethusa (Dall, 1919)

= Notocytharella phaethusa =

Species of gastropod

Notocytharella phaethusa is a species of sea snail, a marine gastropod mollusk in the family Mangeliidae.

== Description ==
The length of the shell attains 5 mm, its diameter 1.25 mm.

(Original description) The minute shell has a very small turbinate brown protoconch of about 2 1/2 whorls, the latter part of which is feebly reticulately sculptured. It is followed by 3 1/2subsequent whorls;. The suture is distinct, not appressed. The whorls are moderately rounded. Their color is whitish with a pinkish brown banded base. The spiral sculpture consists of (on the first whorl one, on the second two) peripheral strong threads, on the body whorl four with much wider striated interspaces. These threads on dead specimens show paler than the general surface. On the base and the siphonal canal are about a dozen smaller close-set threads. None of the thread are nodulose where they cross the ribs. The axial sculpture consists of (on the body whorl eight) narrow sigmoid ribs, with wider interspaces, extending from suture to siphonal canal across the body whorl. The aperture is narrow. >The outer lip is varicose, and smooth within. The inner lip is simple and not callous. The anal sulcus is large and shallow. The columella is straight. The siphonal canal is hardly differentiated.

Many of the specimens have the body whorl conspicuously striped with brown. The dead specimens are often slaty with pale spiral threads. There is also some variation in stoutness and in the strength of the posterior thread which in a few specimens is stronger than the others giving a slight shoulder to the whorl.

== Distribution ==
This marine species occurs off Baja California, Mexico.
