= Charles Baker Adams =

American educator and naturalist

- Born: January 11, 1814; Dorchester, Massachusetts
- Died: January 19, 1853 (aged 39)
- Occupations: educator; naturalist

Charles Baker Adams (January 11, 1814 – January 19, 1853) was an American educator and naturalist.

== Biography ==
He was born in Dorchester, Massachusetts in 1814, the son of Charles J. Adams and Hannah Baker. He graduated from Phillips Academy in 1830 and Amherst College in 1834 with high honors (having transferred from Yale University to Amherst in 1832), and became an assistant to Edward Hitchcock in the Geological Survey of New York in 1836. In 1837, he became a tutor and a lecturer in geology at Amherst College. He left to become professor of chemistry and natural history at Middlebury College in 1838, remaining in that position through 1847.

He served as the first state geologist of Vermont from 1845 through 1848. In 1847, he left Middlebury to become professor of astronomy, zoology, and natural history at Amherst College, a position he retained till his death in 1853, aged 39. He visited the West Indies several times in the interest of science, and wrote on conchology. He was elected a Fellow of the American Academy of Arts and Sciences in 1849.

== Works ==
With the assistance of Alonzo Gray of Brooklyn, New York, he published an elementary work on geology.

He was the author of eleven numbers of Contributions to Conchology, monographs on Stoastoma and Vitrinella, and Catalogue of Shells Collected in Panama (New York, 1852).

- Adams C. B. (1852). Catalogue of shells collected at Panama, with notes on their synonymy, station, and geographical distribution. New York, R. Craighead, printer. 334 pp.
- Gray A. & Adams C. B. (1860). Elements of geology. New York, Harper. 554 pp.
