= List of gastropods described in the 2000s =

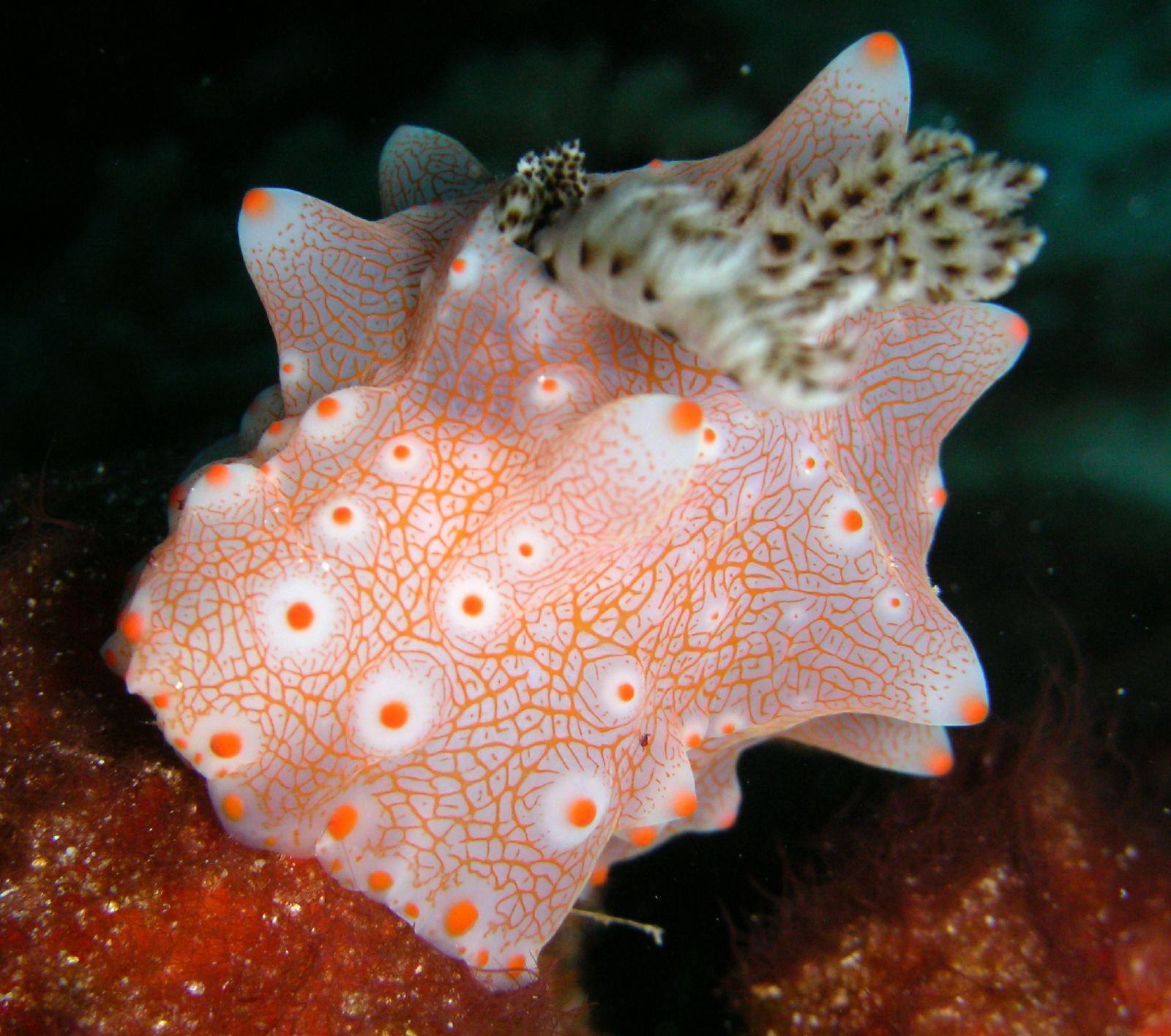
Halgerda batangas, described by Carlson & Hoff in 2000

This list of gastropods described in the 2000s is a list of new species (and other new taxa) of gastropod mollusks (i.e. snails and slugs from saltwater, freshwater, and land) that were described for the first time in the scientific literature during the time span from the year 2000 to the year 2009.

The number of newly described gastropod is enormous. For example, in A Database of Western Atlantic Marine Mollusca (this includes all classes of molluscs, not only gastropods) there are 718 new records from this time span, which total unfortunately includes a number of synonyms.

== 2000 ==
=== Marine species ===
According to the World Register of Marine Species, 395 new marine gastropod taxa were introduced by the scientific and amateur communities worldwide in the year 2000, including new species, genera, and higher taxa.

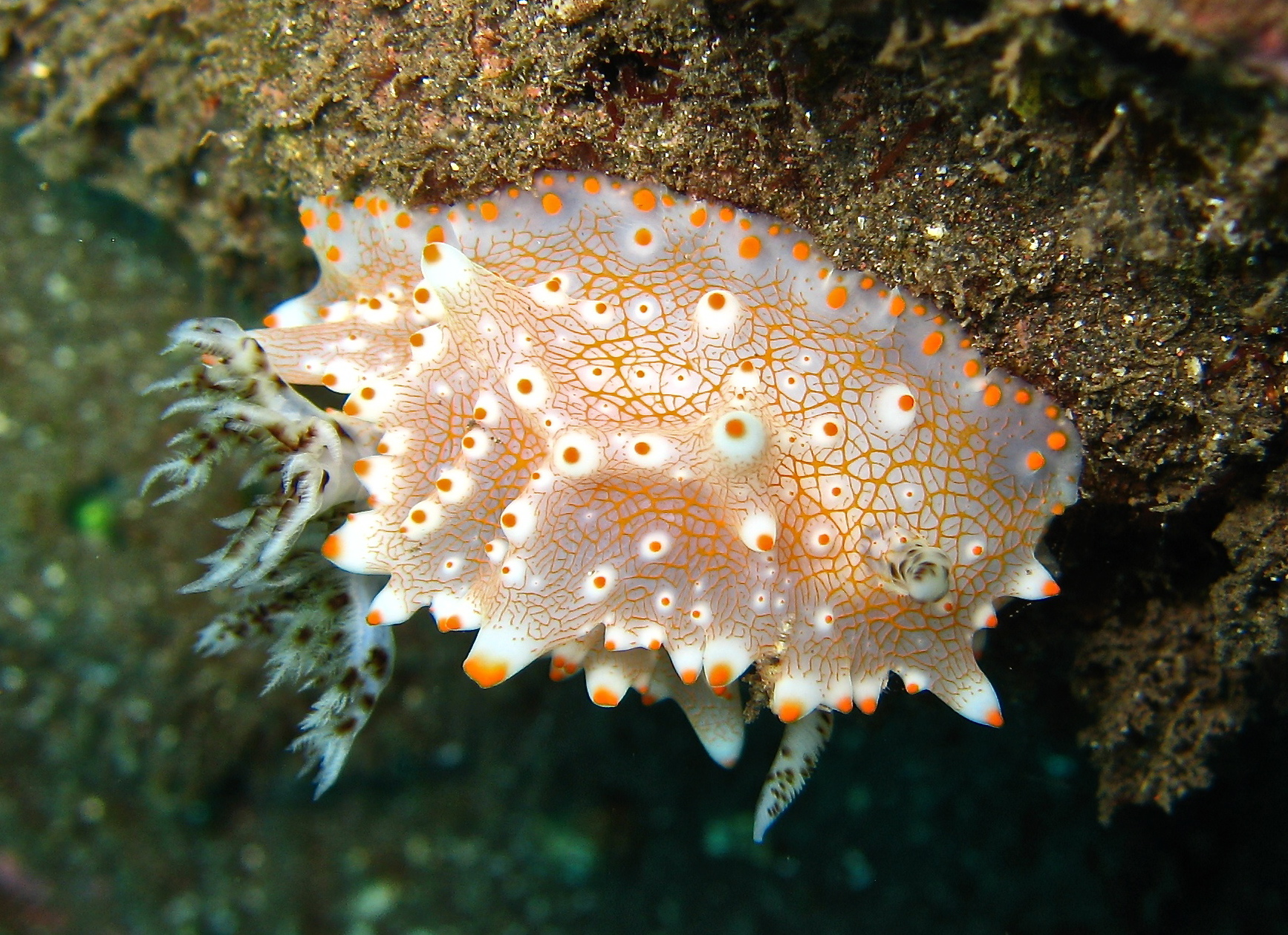
A live specimen of Halgerda batangas from Tulamben, Bali

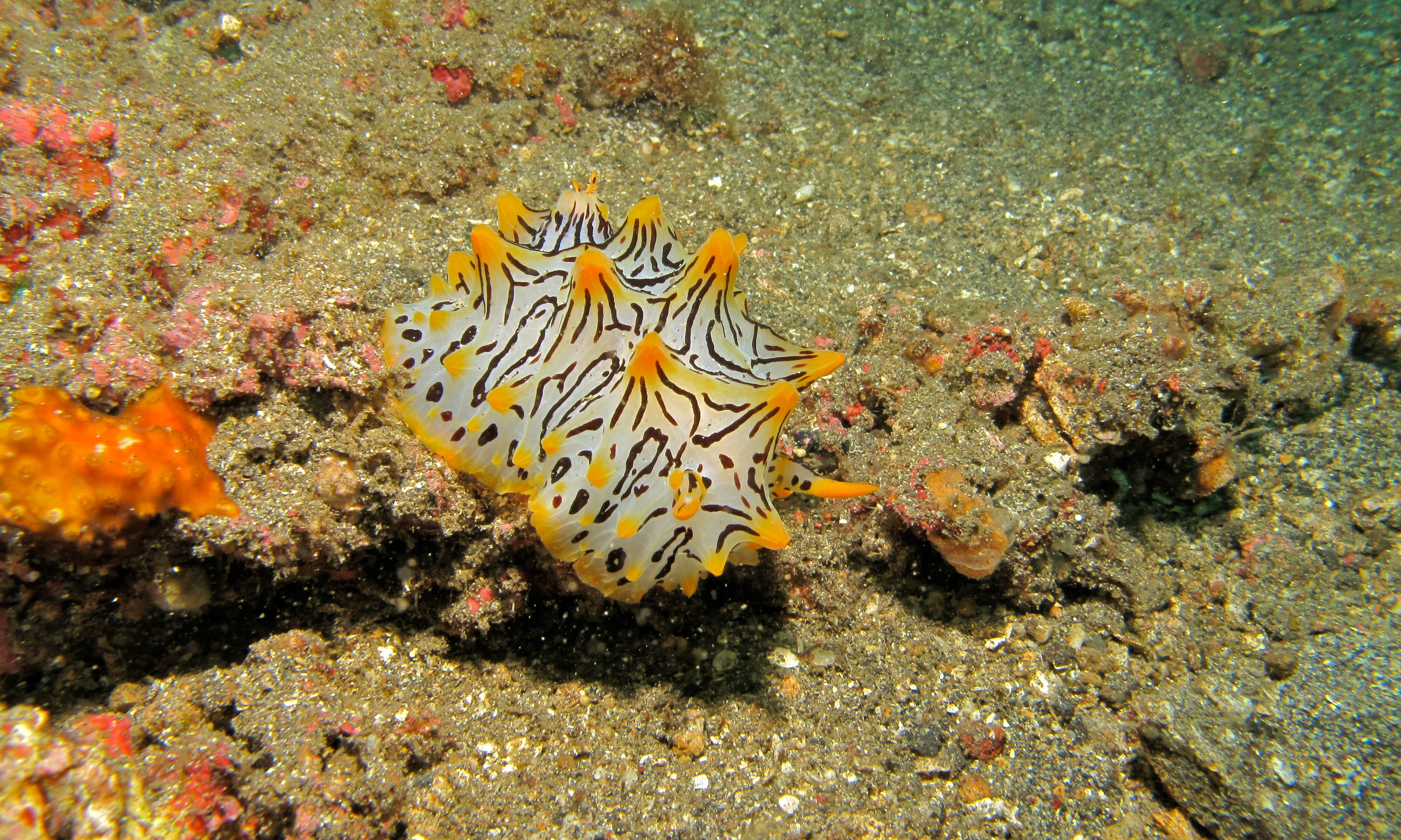
A live specimen of Halgerda okinawa from Sulawesi

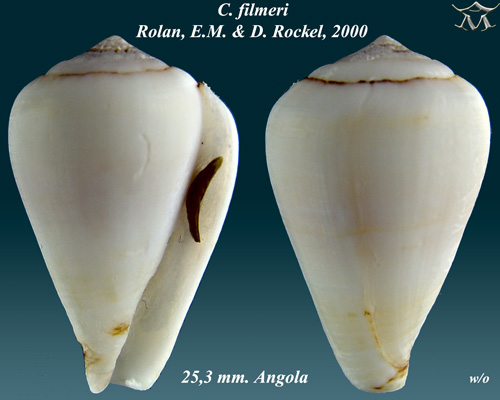
Apertural (left) and abapertural (right) views of a shell of Conus filmeri

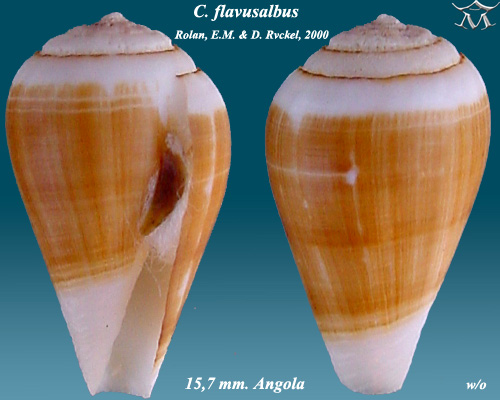
Apertural (left) and abapertural (right) views of a shell of Conus flavusalbus

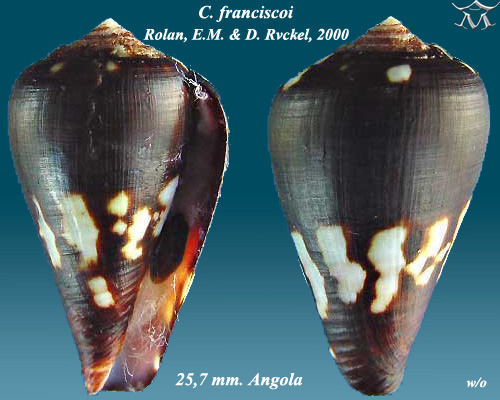
Apertural (left) and abapertural (right) views of a shell of Conus franciscoi

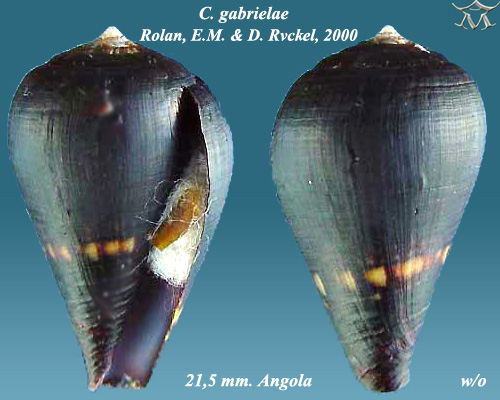
Apertural (left) and abapertural (right) views of a shell of Conus gabrielae

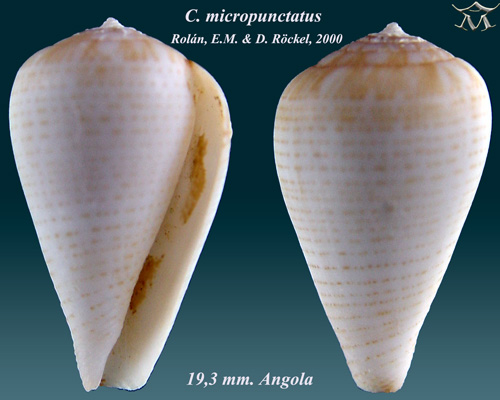
Apertural (left) and abapertural (right) views of a shell of Conus micropunctatus

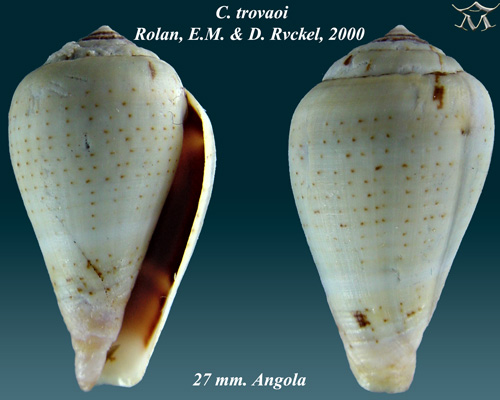
Apertural (left) and abapertural (right) views of a shell of Conus trovaoi

- Abyssochrysos xouthos Killeen & Oliver, 2000
- Admetula afra Petit & Harasewych, 2000
- Afer pseudofusinus Fraussen & Hadorn, 2000
- Aldisa albatrossae Elwood, Valdés & Gosliner, 2000
- Aldisa williamsi Elwood, Valdés & Gosliner, 2000
- Alora kiiensis Nakayama, 2000
- Amaea kushimotensis Nakayama, 2000
- Amaea percancellata Nakayama, 2000 - recombined as Narvaliscala percancellata (Nakayama, 2000)
- Andrusovia andrusovi Starobogatov, 2000
- Andrusovia brusinai Starobogatov, 2000
- Angaria lilianae Monsecour & Monsecour, 2000
- Antillophos gemmulifer (Kilburn, 2000)
- Auristomia barashi (Bogi & Galil, 2000)
- Austrasiatica alexhuberti (Lorenz & Huber, 2000)
- Belchatovia hydrobiopsis Kadolsky & Piechocki, 2000 †
- Berthella aquitaniensis Valdés & Lozouet, 2000 †
- Berthella ateles Valdés & Lozouet, 2000 †
- Berthella canariensis Cervera, Gosliner, Garcia Gomez & Ortea, 2000 - a synonym of Berthella africana (Pruvot-Fol, 1953)
- Cadlina georgiensis Schrödl, 2000
- Caecum continens van der Linden & Moolenbeek, 2000
- Caecum macrum van der Linden & Moolenbeek, 2000
- Calliostoma dedonderi Vilvens, 2000
- Calliostoma emmanueli Vilvens, 2000
- Calliostoma houarti Vilvens, 2000
- Calliostoma poppei Vilvens, 2000
- Cassis patamakanthini Parth, 2000
- Ceratia nagashima Fukuda, 2000
- Chicoreus (Siratus) bessei Houart, 2000 - recombined as Siratus bessei (Houart, 2000)
- Chicoreus (Siratus) hennequini Houart, 2000 - recombined as Siratus hennequini (Houart, 2000)
- Chromodoris buchananae Gosliner & Behrens, 2000
- Chrysallida carpinei Aartsen, Gittenberger & Goud, 2000
- Chrysallida epitonoides Aartsen, Gittenberger E. & Goud, 2000
- Chrysallida gitzelsi Aartsen, Gittenberger & Goud, 2000
- Chrysallida hoenselaari Aartsen, Gittenberger & Goud, 2000
- Chrysallida horii Aartsen, Gittenberger & Goud, 2000
- Chrysallida mcmillanae Aartsen, Gittenberger & Goud, 2000
- Chrysallida menkhorsti Aartsen, Gittenberger & Goud, 2000
- Chrysallida turbonillaeformis Aartsen, Gittenberger & Goud, 2000
- Chrysallida (Parthenina) dekkeri Aartsen, Gittenberger & Goud, 2000
- Chrysallida (Parthenina) faberi Aartsen, Gittenberger & Goud, 2000
- Chrysallida (Parthenina) feldi Aartsen, Gittenberger & Goud, 2000
- Chrysallida (Parthenina) gabmulderi Aartsen, Gittenberger & Goud, 2000
- Chrysallida (Parthenina) josae Aartsen, Gittenberger & Goud, 2000
- Chrysallida (Parthenina) willeminae Aartsen, Gittenberger & Goud, 2000
- Chrysallida (Pyrgulina) kempermani Aartsen, Gittenberger & Goud, 2000 - recombined as Pyrgulina kempermani (Aartsen, Gittenberger & Goud, 2000)
- Chrysallida (Pyrgulina) vanderlindeni Aartsen, Gittenberger & Goud, 2000 - recombined as Pyrgulina vanderlindeni (Aartsen, Gittenberger & Goud, 2000)
- Chrysallida (Trabecula) kronenbergi Aartsen, Gittenberger & Goud, 2000 - recombined as Trabecula kronenbergi (Aartsen, Gittenberger & Goud, 2000)
- Cirsotrema amamiense Nakayama, 2000
- Cirsotrema amplsum Nakayama, 2000
- Cirsotrema bennettorum Garcia, 2000
- Clanculus korkosi Singer, Mienis & Geiger, 2000
- Clanculus richeri Vilvens, 2000
- Claviscala nagaii Nakayama, 2000
- Claviscala nodulosa Nakayama, 2000
- Claviscala subulae Nakayama, 2000
- Colubraria tchangsii Ma & Zhang, 2000
- Colubraria tumida Ma & Zhang, 2000
- Conus filmeri Rolán & Röckel, 2000
- Conus flavusalbus Rolán & Röckel, 2000
- Conus franciscoi Rolán & Röckel, 2000
- Conus gabrielae Rolán & Röckel, 2000
- Conus gordyi Röckel & Bondarev, 2000
- Conus lucaya Petuch, 2000
- Conus micropunctatus Rolán & Röckel, 2000
- Conus moylani Delsaerdt, 2000
- Conus theodorei Petuch, 2000
- Conus trovaoi Rolán & Röckel, 2000
- Copulabyssia riosi Leal & Simone, 2000
- Coralliophila fontanangioyi Smriglio & Mariottini, 2000 - represented as Coralliophila fontanangioyae Smriglio & Mariottini, 2000
- Coralliophila knudseni Smriglio & Mariottini, 2000
- Coralliophila schioettei Smriglio & Mariottini, 2000
- Crepidula argentina Simone, Pastorino & Penchaszadeh, 2000
- Crepidula atrasolea Collin, 2000
- Cuthona elenae (Martynov, 2000)
- Cuthonella elenae Martynov, 2000 - recombined as Cuthona elenae (Martynov, 2000)
- Cycloscala spinosa Nakayama, 2000
- Cyerce orteai Valdés & Camacho-Garcia, 2000
- Cymbiola (Cymbiola) malayensis Douté & Bail, 2000 - alternatively represented as Cymbiola malayensis Douté & Bail, 2000
- Cymbiola (Cymbiola) palawanica Douté & Bail, 2000 - alternatively represented as Cymbiola palawanica Douté & Bail, 2000
- Cymbiola malayensis Douté & Bail, 2000
- Cymbiola palawanica Douté & Bail, 2000
- Cypraecassis wilmae Kreipl & Alf, 2000
- Daphniola louisi Falniowski & Szarowska, 2000
- Dentimargo cruzmoralai Espinosa & Ortea, 2000
- Dentimargo zaidettae Espinosa & Ortea, 2000
- Distorsionella beui Riedel, 2000 - a synonym of Distorsionella lewisi (Beu, 1978)
- Fusinus kazdailisi Fraussen & Hadorn, 2000 - recombined as Chryseofusus kazdailisi (Fraussen & Hadorn, 2000)
- Halgerda batangas Carlson & Hoff, 2000
- Halgerda johnsonorum Carlson & Hoff, 2000
- Halgerda okinawa Carlson & Hoff, 2000
- Latirus beckyae Snyder, 2000 - recombined as Hemipolygona beckyae (Snyder, 2000)
- Phyllidia koehleri Perrone, 20000
- Rissoina onobiformis Rolán & Luque, 2000 - recombined as Ailinzebina onobiformis (Rolán & Luque, 2000)
- Strombus praeraninus Kronenberg & Dekker, 2000 - nomen novum

=== Freshwater species ===
- Alzoniella (Alzoniella) junqua Boeters, 2000
- Alzoniella (Alzoniella) haicabia Boeters, 2000
- Bythinella bertrandi Bernasconi, 2000
- Bythinella jourdei Bernasconi, 2000
- Bythinella lalindei Bernasconi, 2000 a synonym for Bythinella bicarinata
- Bythinella pujolensis Bernasconi, 2000
- Bythinella rondelaudi Bernasconi, 2000
- Bythinella troyana Bernasconi, 2000
- Bythinella vimperei Bernasconi, 2000
- Contectiana (Contectiana) bazavlukensis Datsenko, 2000 † - recombined as Viviparus bazavlukensis (Datsenko, 2000)†

=== Terrestrial species ===
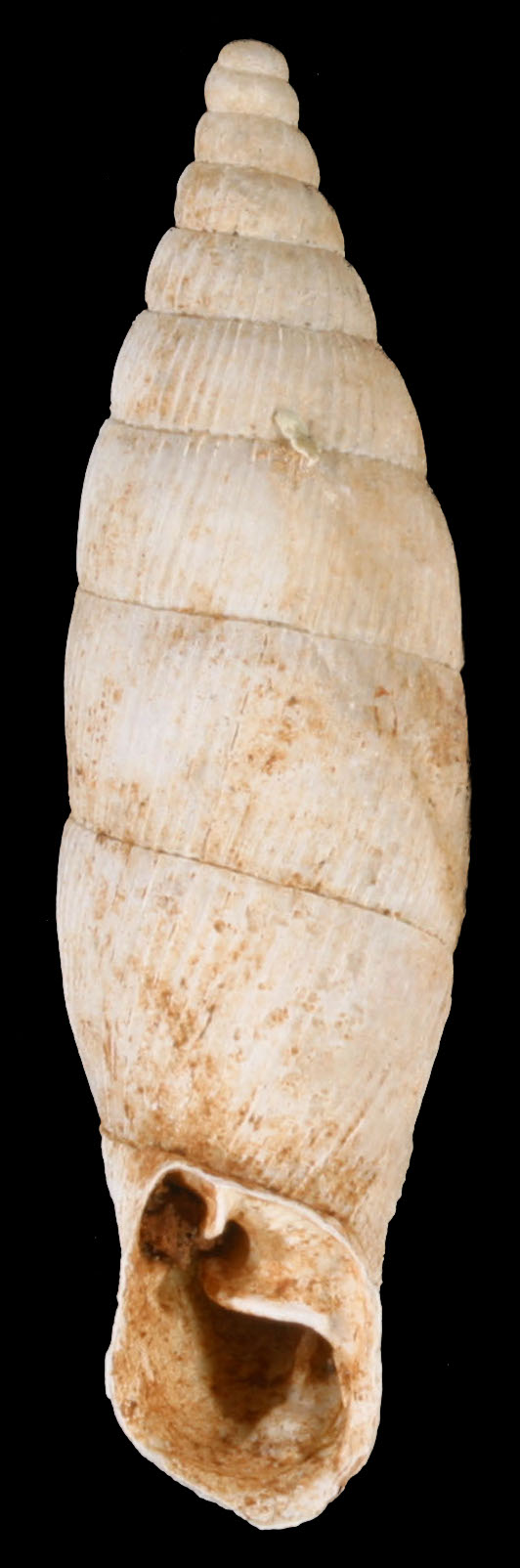
A shell of Albinaria latelamellaris, described by Neubert, Örstan & Welter-Schultes in 2000

- Albinaria latelamellaris Neubert, Örstan & Welter-Schultes, 2000
- Anaglyphula minutissima Maassen, 2000
- Deroceras dewinteri Maassen, 2000
- Georissa pangianensis Maassen, 2000
- Liardetia pseudojavanaMaassen, 2000
- Microcystina clarkae Maassen, 2000
- Philalanka pusilla Maassen, 2000
- Ptychopatula solemi Maassen, 2000
- Ptychopatula vermeuleni Maassen, 2000
- Rahula moolenbeeki Maassen, 2000
- Teracharopa goudi Maassen, 2000
- Teracharopa rara Maassen, 2000
- Tsoukatosia liae Gittenberger, 2000

=== Fossil species ===
- Sioliella ovata Wesselingh, 2000 †

=== Other taxa ===
- family Canterburyellidae Bandel, Gründel & Maxwell, 2000 †
- family Cortinellidae Bandel, 2000 †
- genus Belchatovia Kadolsky & Piechocki, 2000 †
- genus Benthodorbis Ponder & Avern, 2000
- genus Teracharopa Maassen, 2000
- genus Tsoukatosia Gittenberger, 2000
- subspecies Alzoniella (Alzoniella) perrisii irubensis Boeters, 2000
- subspecies Conus pennaceus tsara Korn, Niederhöfer & Blöcher, 2000 - a synonym of Conus pennaceus Born, 1778
- subspecies Conus pennaceus vezoi Korn, Niederhöfer & Blöcher, 2000
- subspecies Cypraeovula castanea latebrosa Swarts & Liltved in Liltved, 2000

== 2001 ==
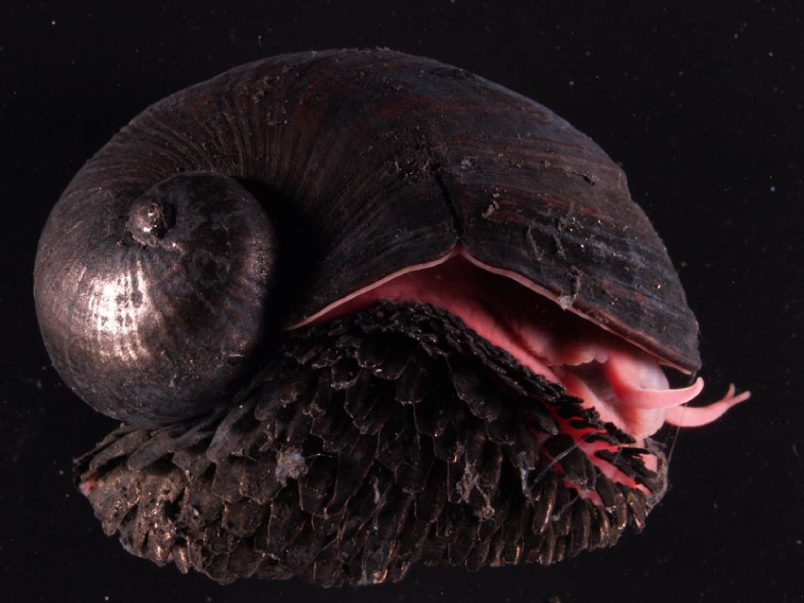
The scaly-foot gastropod, Chrysomallon squamiferum, was discovered in 2001, but it was described in 2015.

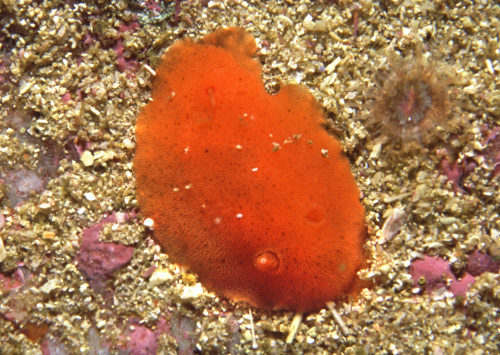
The red sponge nudibranch, Rostanga elandsia

New species

- Arinia jensi Maassen, 2001
- Arinia panhai Maassen, 2001
- Aukena endodonta Bouchet & Abdou, 2001 - extinct species from Gambier Islands. The subgenus Aukena H. B. Baker, 1940 elevated to genus level.
- Chicoreus (Siratus) guionneti Merle, Garrigues & Pointier, 2001
- Aylacostoma ci Simone, 2001
- Bullata analuciae Souza & Coovert, 2001
- Chicoreus monicae Bozzetti, 2001
- Chicoreus setionoi Houart, 2001
- Chicoreus vokesae Macsotay & Campos, 2001
- Circassina lasistana Hausdorf, 2001
- Circassina pergranulata Hausdorf, 2001
- Circassina septentrionalis Hausdorf, 2001
- Conus anabelae Rolán & Röckel, 2001
- Conus babaensis Rolán & Röckel, 2001
- Conus empressae Lorenz, 2001
- Conus tenuilineatus Rolán & Röckel, 2001
- Ena menkhorsti Hausdorf & Bank, 2001
- Doryssa ipupiara Simone, 2001
- Ena dazimonensis Hausdorf & Bank, 2001
- Epitonium oliverioi Bonfitto & Sabelli, 2001
- Ercolania selva Ortea & Espinosa, 2001
- Kessneria papillosa Walker & Ponder, 2001
- Opisthostoma christae Maassen, 2001
- Parviturbo rolani Engl, 2001
- Rostanga elandsia Garovoy, Valdés & Gosliner, 2001
- Rostanga aureamala Garovoy, Valdés & Gosliner, 2001
- Rostanga phepha Garovoy, Valdés & Gosliner, 2001
- Thais keluo Tan & Liu, 2001

Other taxa

- tribe Spirovallini Waterhouse, 2001 of the family Eotomariidae

== 2002 ==
New species

- Afroturbonilla multitudinalis Peñas & Rolán, 2002
- Brotia praetermissa Köhler & Glaubrecht, 2002
- Buccinum thermophilum Harasewych & Kantor, 2002
- Bythinella bouloti Girardi, Bichain & Wienin, 2002
- Bythinella galerae Girardi, Bichain & Wienin, 2002
- Bythinella wawrzineki Bernasconi, 2002
- Calma gobioophaga Calado & Urgorri, 2002
- Chicoreus guionneti Merle, Garrigues & Pointier, 2002
- Chrysallida annobonensis Peñas & Rolán, 2002
- Chrysallida ryalli Peñas & Rolán, 2002
- Coccoderma semmelinki Maassen, 2002
- Curvella myrmecophila Verdcourt, 2002
- Curvella usambarica Verdcourt, 2002
- Diaphana haini Linse & Schiøtte, 2002
- Diplommatina abundans Maassen, 2002
- Diplommatina carinaspinosa Maassen, 2002
- Diplommatina gatudensis Maassen, 2002
- Diplommatina karoensis Maassen, 2002
- Diplommatina vanderblommi Maassen, 2002
- Diplommatina wilhelminae Maassen, 2002
- Eremopyrgus elegans Hershler, Liu & Landye 2002
- Eulimella juliae Peñas & Rolán, 2002
- Graphis barashi Van Aartsen, 2002
- Haemiphaedusa (Selenophaedusa) bavayi Nordiseck, 2002
- Macedonica pindica Gittenberger, 2002
- Margarites imperialis Simone & Birman, 2002
- Margarites mirabilis Simone & Birman, 2002
- Megastomia troncosoi Peñas & Rolán, 2002
- Montenegrina dennisi Gittenberger, 2002
- Ondina fragilissima Peñas & Rolán, 2002
- Opisthostoma banki Maassen, 2002
- Opisthostoma clerxi
- Opisthostoma secretum Maassen, 2002
- Palaina reederi Maassen, 2002
- Plectostoma kitteli Maassen, 2002
- Syrnola arae Peñas & Rolán, 2002
- Turbonilla goudi Peñas & Rolán, 2002
- Turbonilla jordii Peñas & Rolán, 2002
- Turbonilla lozoueti Peñas & Rolán, 2002
- Turbonilla parsysti Peñas & Rolán, 2002
- Turbonilla coseli Peñas & Rolán, 2002

Fossil species

- Aporrhais dingdenensis Marquet, Grigis & Landau, 2002

Other taxa

- genus Loosjesia Nordiseck, 2002
- subgenus Cylindrophaedusa (Montiphaedusa) Nordiseck, 2002
- subgenus Dautzenbergiella (Mansuyia) Nordiseck, 2002
- subgenus Hemiphaedusa (Dendrophaedusa) Nordiseck, 2002
- subgenus Juttingia (Pseudohemiphaedusa) Nordiseck, 2002
- subspecies Idyla castalia yeruni Gittenberger, 2002
- subspecies Macedonica pindica bellula Gittenberger, 2002
- subspecies Macedonica pindica pindica Gittenberger, 2002
- subspecies Macedonica janinensis maasseni Gittenberger, 2002
- subspecies Montenegrina dennisi dennisi Gittenberger, 2002
- subspecies Montenegrina dennisi protruda Gittenberger, 2002

== 2003 ==
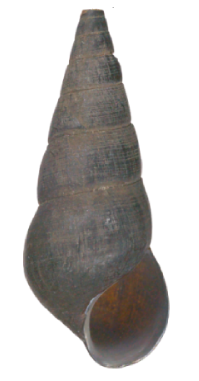
A shell of Tylomelania helmuti

New species

- Benthobia atafona Simone, 2003
- Benthobia complexirhyna Simone, 2003
- Benthobia sima Simone, 2003
- Benthobia tornatilis Simone, 2003
- Bythinella geisserti Boeters & Falkner, 2003
- Gabbia campícola Ponder, 2003
- Gabbia kendricki Ponder, 2003
- Gabbia pallidula Ponder, 2003
- Gabbia davisi Ponder, 2003
- Gabbia napierensis Ponder, 2003
- Gabbia rotunda Ponder, 2003
- Gabbia Fontana Ponder, 2003
- Gabbia obesa Ponder, 2003
- Gabbia túmida Ponder, 2003
- Gabbia kessneri Ponder, 2003
- Gabbia beecheyi Ponder, 2003
- Gabbia microcosta Ponder, 2003
- Gabbia adusta Ponder, 2003
- Gabbia lutaria Ponder, 2003
- Gabbia clathrata Ponder, 2003
- Gabbia spiralis Ponder, 2003
- Gabbia carinata Ponder, 2003
- Hirtudiscus boyacensis Hausdorf, 2003
- Hirtudiscus comatus Hausdorf, 2003
- Hirtudiscus curei Hausdorf, 2003
- Phyllodesmium parangatum Ortiz & Gosliner, 2003
- Tritonia bollandi Smith & Gosliner, 2003
- Tylomelania bakara Von Rintelen & Glaubrecht, 2003
- Tylomelania kruimeli Von Rintelen & Glaubrecht, 2003
- Tylomelania helmuti Von Rintelen & Glaubrecht, 2003

Other taxa

- subfamily Depressizoninae Geiger, 2003. It was considered a synonym of Scissurellinae according to Bouchet & Rocroi 2005, but in 2009 it was updated to family level Depressizonidae.
- tribe Bistolidini C. Meyer, 2003 in the Cypraeidae
- tribe Isandini Hickman, 2003 in the Umboiniinae, Trochidae.
- genus Contradusta Meyer, 2003
- genus Cryptocypraea Meyer, 2003
- genus Jagora Köhler & Glaubrecht, 2003
- genus Palmulacypraea Meyer, 2003

== 2004 ==
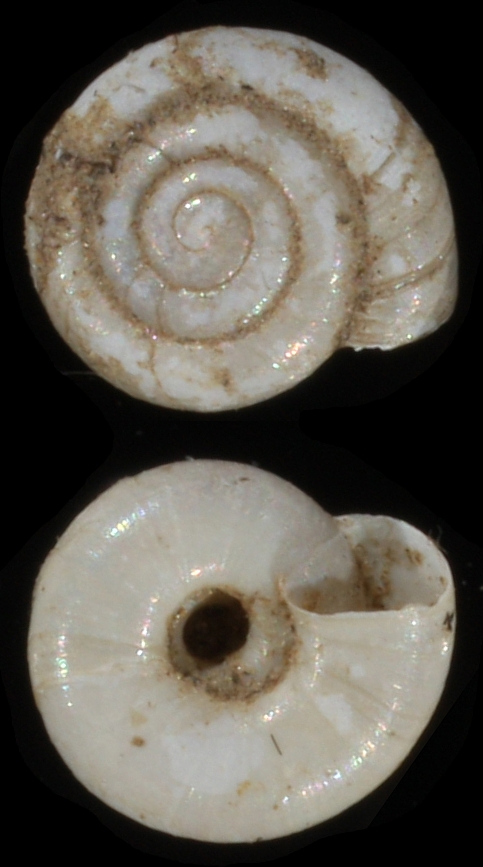
Apical and umbilical view of a shell of Vitrea vereae

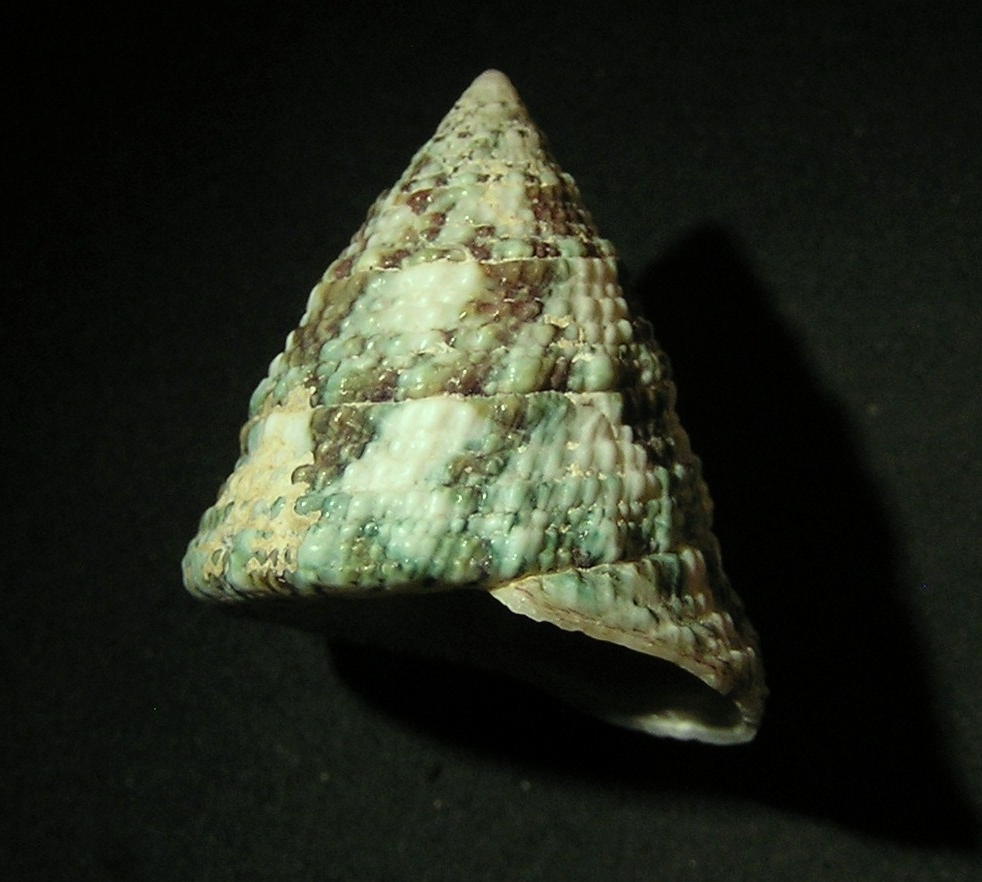
A shell of Tectus magnificus

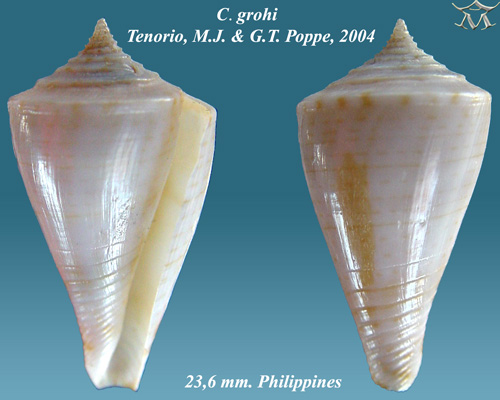
A shell of Conus grohi

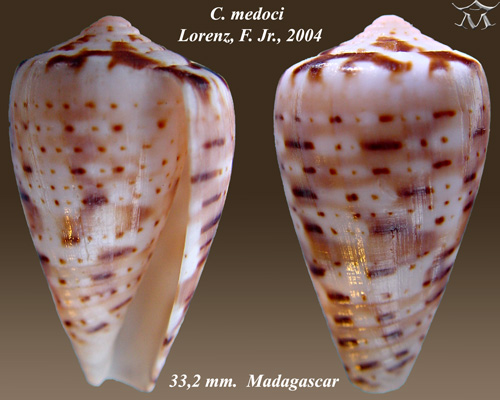
A shell of Conus medoci

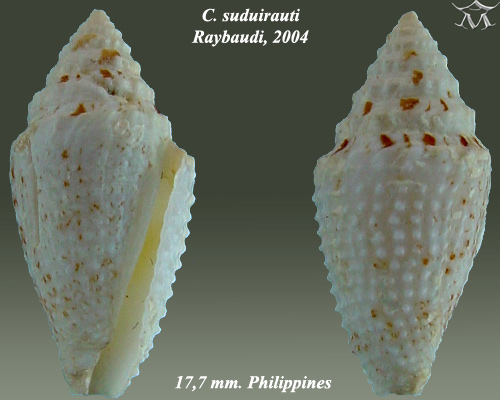
A shell of Conus suduirauti

New species

- Amphidromus protania Lehmann & Maassen, 2004
- Calyptraea africana Rolán, 2004
- Calyptraea inexpectata Rolán, 2004
- Chicoreus allaryi Houart, Quiquandon & Briano, 2004
- Cochlostoma (Titanopoma) fuchsi Fehér, 2004
- Cochlostoma (Titanopoma) pinteri Fehér, 2004
- Crepidula cachimilla Cledón, Simone & Penchaszadeh, 2004
- Euxina patrisnemethi Németh & Szekeres, 2004
- Gulella herberti Van Bruggen, 2004
- Harmozica occidentalis Hausdorf, 2004
- Incidostoma tupy Simone, 2004
- Pravispira subserrulata Németh & Szekeres, 2004
- Orculella astirakiensis Gittenberger & Hausdorf, 2004
- Orculella creantirudis Gittenberger & Hausdorf, 2004
- Orculella creticostata Gittenberger & Hausdorf, 2004
- Orculella cretimaxima Gittenberger & Hausdorf, 2004
- Orculella cretiminuta Gittenberger & Hausdorf, 2004
- Orculella cretilasithi Gittenberger & Hausdorf, 2004
- Orculella cretioreina Gittenberger & Hausdorf, 2004
- Orculella diensis Gittenberger & Hausdorf, 2004
- Orculella fodela Gittenberger & Hausdorf, 2004
- Orculella franciscoi Gittenberger & Hausdorf, 2004
- Orculella scalaris Gittenberger & Hausdorf, 2004
- Phyllodesmium jakobsenae Burghardt & Wägele, 2004
- Pomacea curumim Simone, 2004
- Radiodiscus promatensis Miquel, Ramírez & Thomé, 2004
- Vitrea vereae Irikov, Georgiev & Riedel, 2004
- Zilchogyra zulmae Miquel, Ramírez & Thomé, 2004

from Visaya 1(1):

- Calliostoma guphili
- Calliostoma philippei
- Calliostoma vilvensi
- Tectus magnificus
- Cypraea leucodon leucodon forma escotio - new form
- Conus frausseni
- Conus grohi
- Conus terryni
- Engina ignicula
- Nassaria perlata

from Visaya 1(2):

- Conus medoci
- Conus chiapponorum
- Conus vulcanus
- Conus claudiae
- Conus isabelarum
- Conus crioulus
- Conus suduirauti
- Physella winnipegensis

Other taxa

- genus Borlumastus Örstan & Yildirim, 2004
- subspecies Albinaria eburnea inflaticollis Nordsieck
- subspecies Albinaria eburnea samariae Nordsieck
- subspecies Albinaria troglodytes niproensis Nordsieck
- subspecies Albinaria troglodytes strictecostata Nordsieck
- subspecies Albinaria virginea gavdopoulensis Nordsieck
- subspecies Albinaria virginea litoralis Nordsieck
- subspecies Cochlostoma (Titanopoma) auritum gjonii Fehér, 2004
- subspecies Cochlostoma (Titanopoma) hoyeri csikii Fehér, 2004
- subspecies Cochlostoma (Titanopoma) hoyeri lillae Fehér, 2004
- subspecies Cochlostoma (Titanopoma) pinteri erossi Fehér, 2004
- subspecies Cochlostoma (Titanopoma) pinteri hanswagneri Fehér, 2004
- subspecies Cochlostoma (Titanopoma) pinteri pinteri Fehér, 2004

== 2005 ==
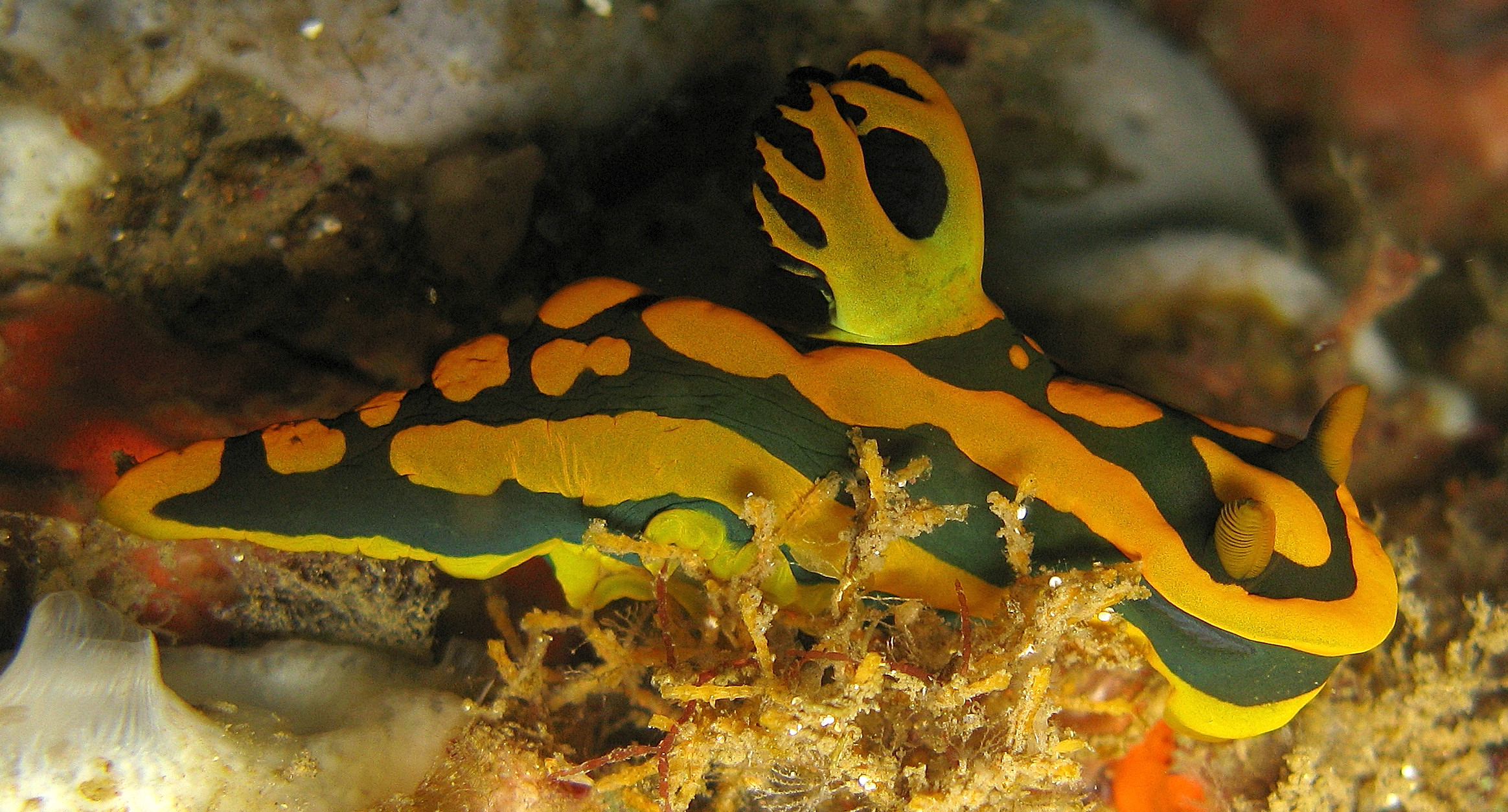
Side view of Tambja gabrielae described by Pola, Cervera & Gosliner in 2005

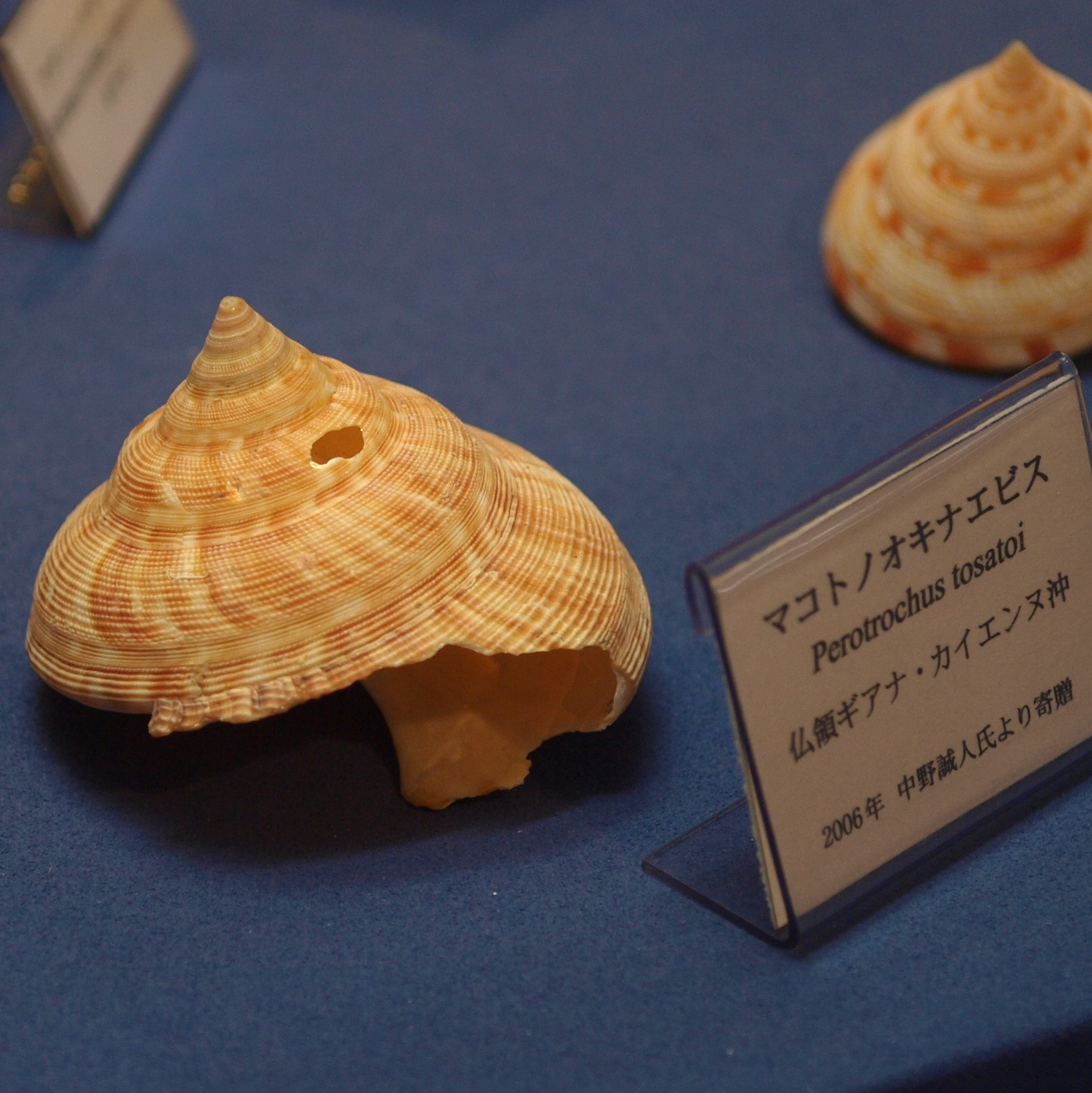
A shell of Perotrochus tosatoi

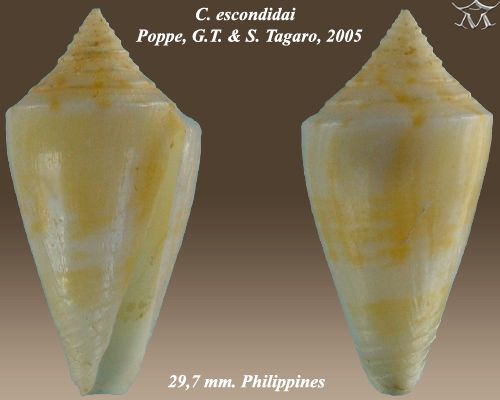
Apertural (left) and abapertural views of a shell of Conus escondiai

New species

- Anachis ryalli Rolán, 2005
- Caecum rehderi Raines & Pizzini, 2005
- Caecum heterochromum Raines & Pizzini, 2005
- Caecum pascuanum Raines & Pizzini, 2005
- Caecum rapanuiense Raines & Pizzini, 2005
- Caecum campanulatum Raines & Pizzini, 2005
- Chicoreus franchii Cossignani, 2005
- Codringtonia elisabethae Subai, 2005
- Codringtonia gittenbergeri Subai, 2005
- Codringtonia helenae Subai, 2005
- Conus escondidai Poppe & Tagaro, 2005
- Cypraea hungerfordi lovetha Poppe, Tagaro & Buijse, 2005 - new subspecies
- Dentarene rosadoi Bozzetti & Ferrario, 2005
- Dentiovula lissenungensis Lorenz, 2005
- Dolichupis virgo Fehse & Grego, 2005
- Engina goncalvesi Coltro, 2005
- Engina janowskyi Coltro, 2005
- Fasciolaria agatha Simone & Abbate, 2005
- Fusinus satsumaensis Hadorn & Chino, 2005
- Guildfordia superba Poppe, Tagaro & Dekker, 2005
- Haplocochlias ortizi Espinosa, Oreta & Fernández-Garcés, 2005
- Janaoliva amoni (Sterba & Lorenz, 2005) - Olivella amoni Sterba & Lorenz, 2005
- Lilloiconcha costulata Hausdorf, 2005
- Lilloiconcha laevigata Hausdorf, 2005
- Lodderena bunnelli Redfern & Rolán, 2005
- Mitrella aemulata Rolán, 2005
- Mitrella africana Rolán, 2005
- Mitrella annobonensis Rolán, 2005
- Mitrella condei Rolán, 2005
- Mitrella fimbriata Pelorce & Boyer, 2005
- Mitrella hernandezi Boyer & Rolán, 2005
- Mitrella inesitae Rolán, 2005
- Mitrella inflata Pelorce & Boyer, 2005
- Mitrella saotomensis Rolán, 2005
- Mitrella tenebrosa Rolán, 2005
- Nassarina procera Pelorce & Boyer, 2005
- Nassarina rolani Pelorce & Boyer, 2005
- Niveria brasilica Fehse & Grego, 2005
- Notovoluta gerondiosi Bail & Limpus, 2005
- Patelloida ryukyuensis Nakano & Ozawa, 2005
- Perotrochus tosatoi Anseeuw, Goto & Abdi, 2005
- Pisania rosadoi Bozzetti & Ferrario, 2005
- Pusula macaeica Fehse & Grego, 2005
- Robertsiella silvicola Attwood, Lokman & Ong, 2005
- Rostellariella lorenzi Morrison, 2005
- Tambja gabrielae Pola, Cervera & Gosliner, 2005
- Tambja tentaculata Pola, Cervera & Gosliner, 2005
- Tambja victoriae Pola, Cervera & Gosliner, 2005
- Tambja zulu Pola, Cervera & Gosliner, 2005
- Tonna hardyi Bozzetti & Ferrario, 2005

Other taxa:

- subspecies Zoila friendii marina Kostin, 2005 - new subspecies
- subspecies Conus betulinus rufoluteus Bozzetti & Ferrario, 2005

== 2006 ==
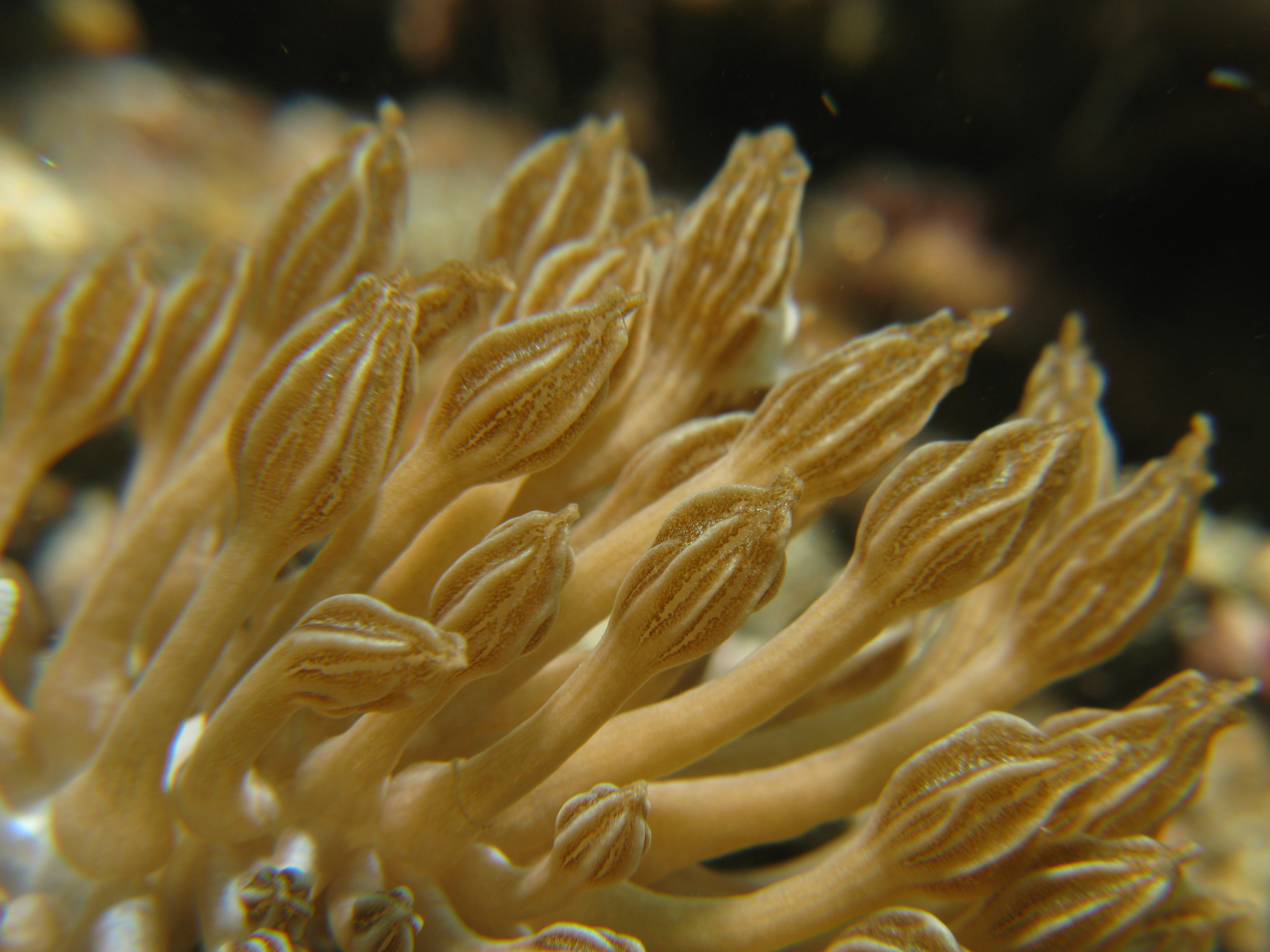
Detail of the cerata of Phyllodesmium rudmani

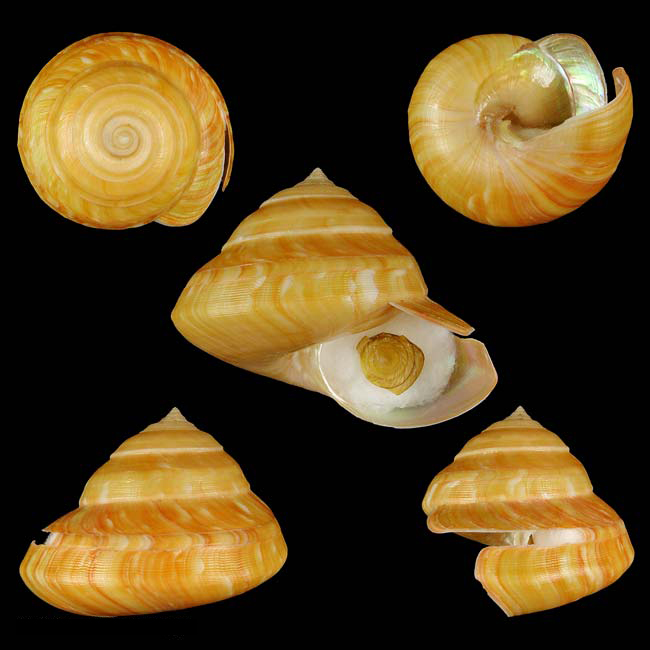
Different views of a shell of Bayertrochus philpoppei

New species

- Alcadia novogranadensis Hausdorf, 2006
- Amphidromus inversus albulus Sutcharit & Panha, 2006
- Angaria nhatrangensis Dekker, 2006
- Apameaus apameae Sivan, Heller & van Damme, 2006
- Astraea danieli Alf & Kreipl, 2006
- Bathylepeta linseae Schwabe, 2006
- Bayerotrochus philpoppei Anseeuw, Poppe & Goto, 2006
- Conassiminea studderti Fukuda & Ponder, 2006
- Conassiminea zheni Fukuda & Ponder, 2006
- Crenilabium birmani Simone, 2006
- Crepidula carioca Simone, 2006
- Crepidula margarita Simone, 2006
- Crepidula intratesta Simone, 2006
- Crepidula pyguaia Simone, 2006
- Epiphragmophora guevarai Cuezzo, 2006
- Epiphragmophora quirogai Cuezzo, 2006
- Epiphragmophora walshi Cuezzo, 2006
- Gaza compta Simone & Cunha, 2006
- Hypselodoris lilyeveae Alejandrino & Valdés 2006
- Inella unicornium Simone, 2006
- Iphinopsis splendens Simone & Birman, 2006
- Lucapina elisae Costa & Simone, 2006
- Margarites mirabilis Simone & Birman, 2006
- Margarites imperialis Simone & Birman, 2006
- Phyllodesmium rudmani Burghardt & Gosliner, 2006
- Taylorconcha insperata Hershler, 2006
- Tritonia dantarti Ballesteros & Avila, 2006

Other taxa

- genus Apameaus Sivan, Heller & van Damme, 2006

== 2007 ==
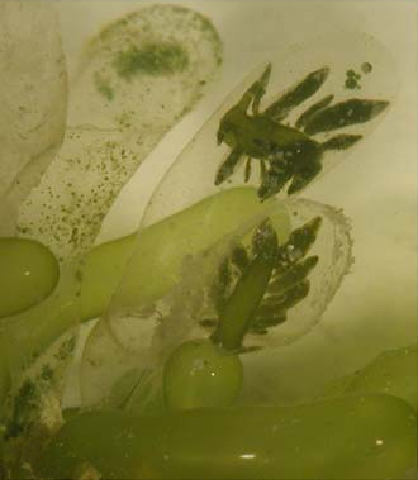
Ercolania kencolesi inside Boergesenia cf. forbesii. The slug's length is about 0.5 cm.

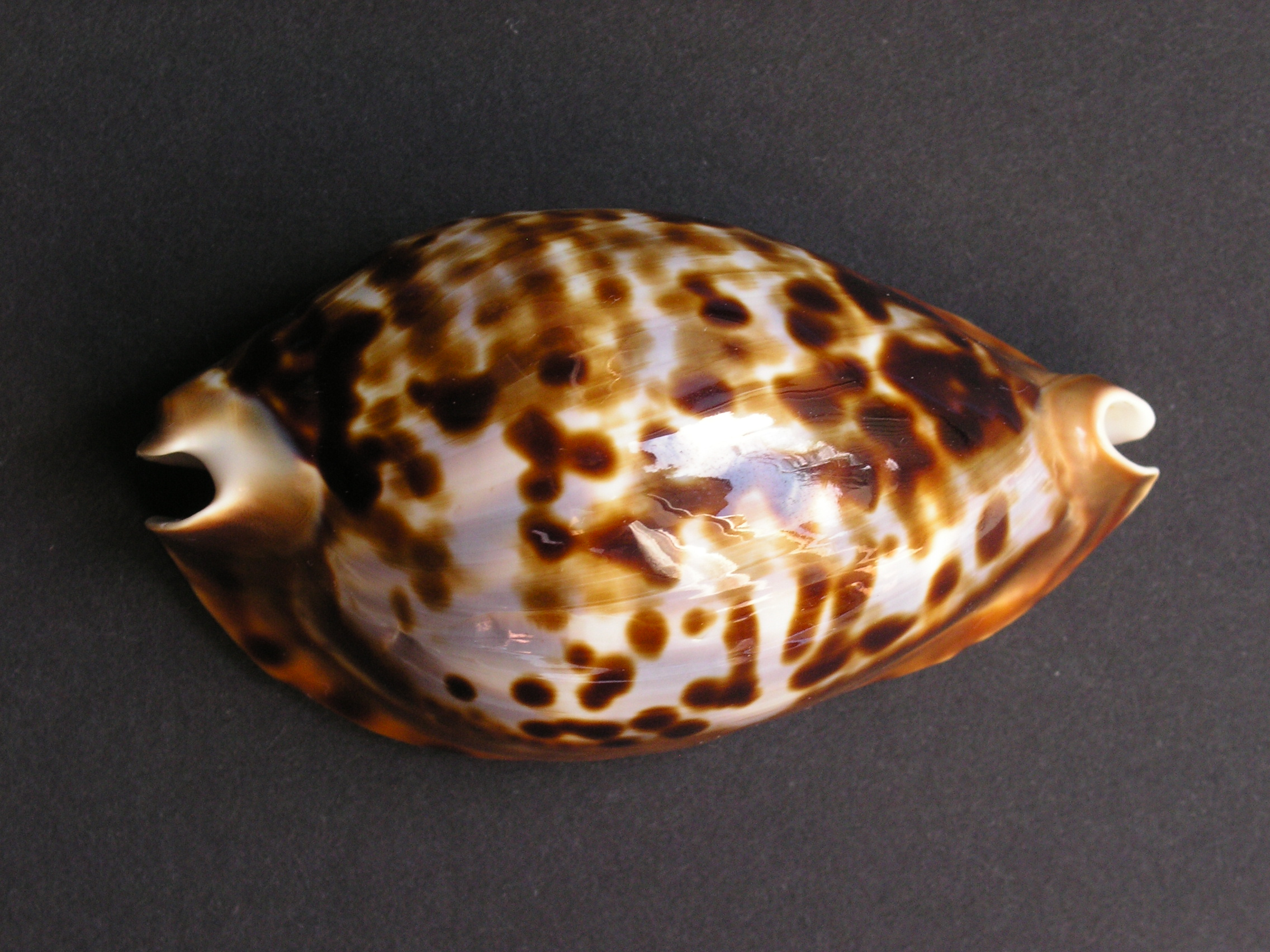
An empty shell of Zoila friendii

New species

- Alderia willowi Krug et al., 2007
- Angaria carmencita Günther, 2007
- Bithynia canyamelensis Altaba, 2007
- Bithynia manonellesi Altaba, 2007
- Bithynia pauli Altaba, 2007
- Bithynia riddifordi Altaba, 2007
- Chicoreus pisori Houart, 2007
- Columbella costa Simone, 2007
- Costasiella coronata Swennen, 2007
- Ercolania kencolesi Grzymbowski, Stemmer & Wagele, 2007
- Georissa filiasaulae Haase & Schilthuizen, 2007
- Gerdiella alvesi Lima, Barros & Petit, 2007
- Gyraulus pamphylicus Glöer & Rähle, 2007
- Islamia laiae Altaba, 2007
- Lirabuccinum musculus Callomon & Lawless, 2007
- Oxychilus albuferensis Altaba, 2007
- Oxychilus yartanicus Altaba, 2007
- Paracrostoma martini Köhler & Glaubrecht, 2007
- Paracrostoma tigrina Köhler & Glaubrecht, 2007
- Phaedusa timorensis Nordsieck, 2007
- Phuphania globosa Tumpeesuwan, Naggs & Panha, 2007
- Pseudamnicola artanensis Altaba, 2007
- Pseudamnicola meloussensis Altaba, 2007
- Pseudamnicola tramuntanae Altaba, 2007
- Radix jordii Altaba, 2007
- Radix linae Altaba, 2007
- Zoila friendii kostini Lorenz & Chiapponi, 2007 - new subspecies

Other taxa

- genus Phuphania Tumpeesuwan, Naggs & Panha, 2007

== 2008 ==
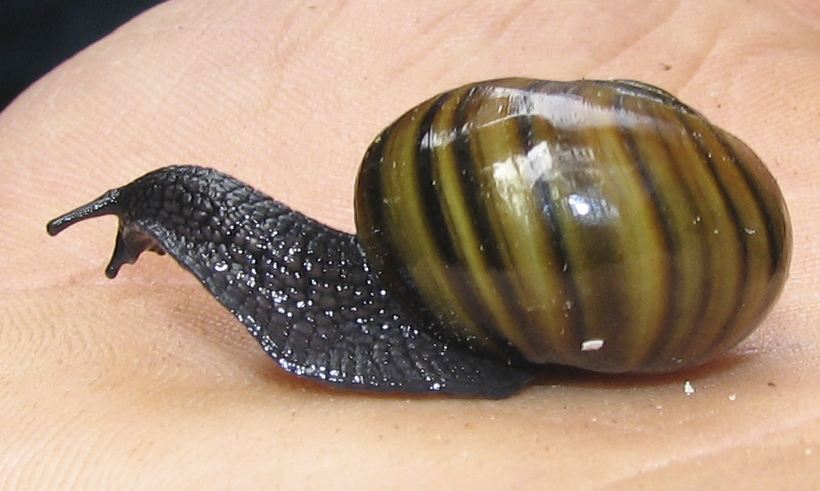
A live specimen of Powelliphanta augusta

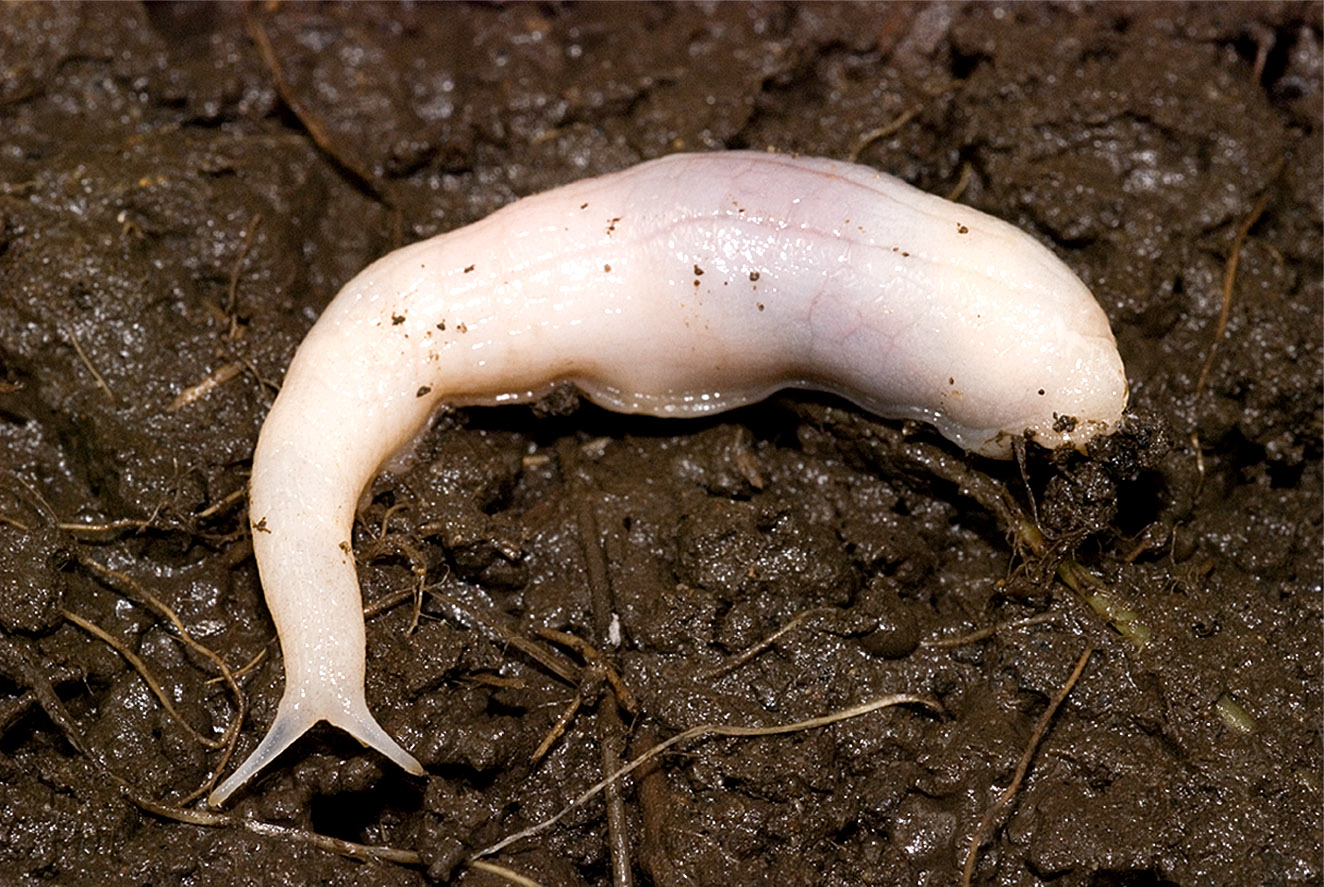
The ghost slug, Selenochlamys ysbryda

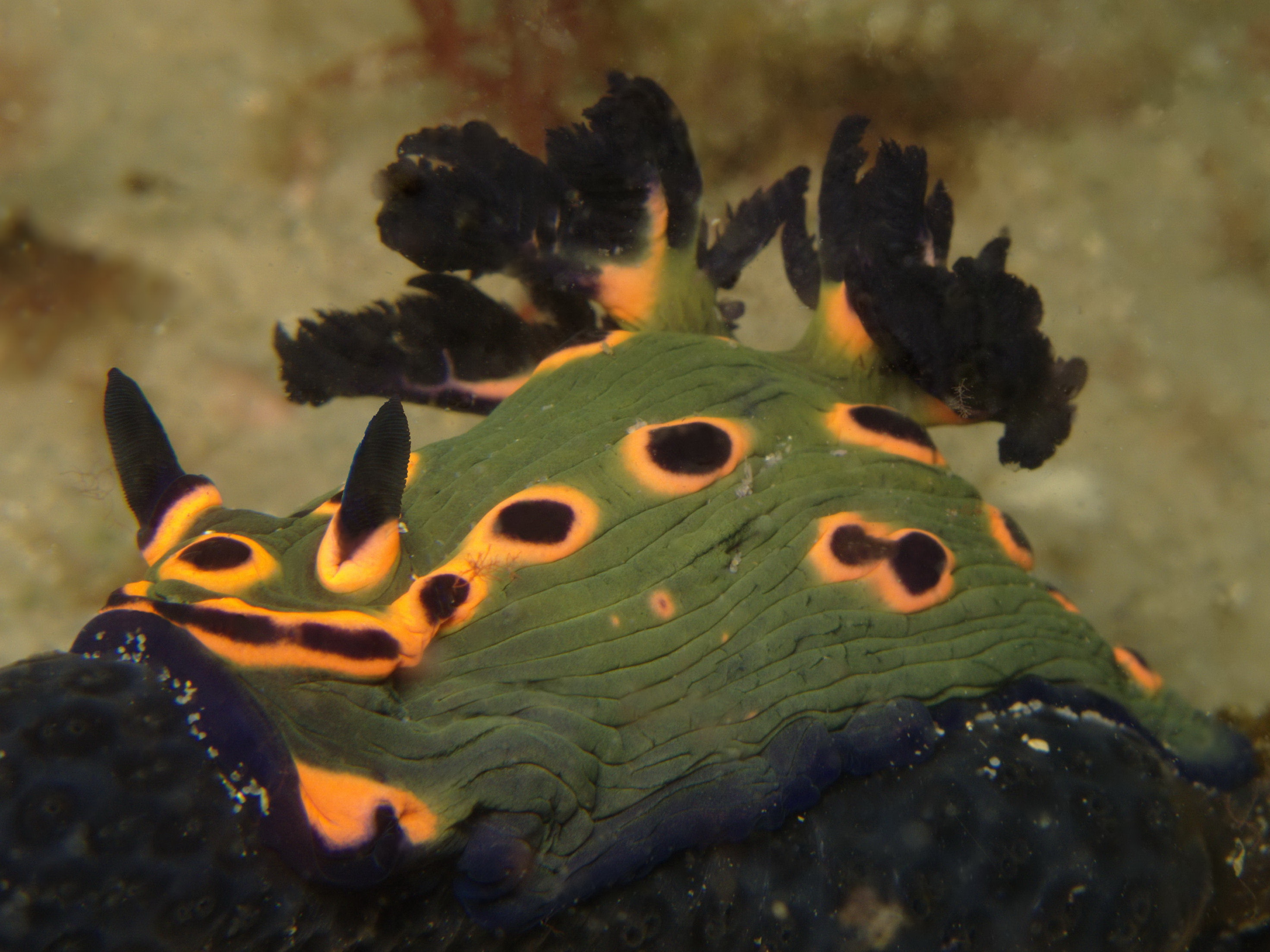
A live individual of the nudibranch Nembrotha rosannulata

New species

- Albinaria linnei Gittenberger, 2008, one of over a hundred different species within the genus Albinaria
- Brotia mariae Köhler, 2008
- Brotia laodelectata Köhler, 2008
- Bulla arabica Malaquias & Reid, 2008
- Chicoreus jessicae Houart, 2008
- Chilina iguazuensis Gregoric & Rumi, 2008
- Conus cakobaui Moolenbeek, Röckel, & Bouchet, 2008
- Conus fijiensis Moolenbeek, Röckel, & Bouchet, 2008
- Conus fijisulcatus Moolenbeek, Röckel, & Bouchet, 2008
- Conus joliveti Moolenbeek, Röckel, & Bouchet, 2008
- Conus sutanorcum Moolenbeek, Röckel, & Bouchet, 2008
- Falsimargarita terespira Simone, 2008
- Gulella systemanaturae Bruggen, 2008, which was named in honor of the 250th anniversary of the publication of Linnaeus' book Systema Naturae
- Helix goderdziana Mumladze, Tarkhnishvili & Pokryszko, 2008, the largest species in the genus Helix
- Nembrotha rosannulata Pola, Cervera & Gosliner, 2008 and Nembrotha aurea Pola, Cervera & Gosliner, 2008
- Opisthostoma vermiculum Clements & Vermeulen, 2008 is unique in that the coiling of its shell displays four different axes of rotation.
- Phyllodesmium koehleri Burghardt, Schrödl & Wägele, 2008
- Phyllodesmium lembehense Burghardt, Schrödl & Wägele, 2008
- Phyllodesmium lizardensis Burghardt, Schrödl & Wägele, 2008
- Powelliphanta augusta Walker, Trewick & Barker, 2008, a rare endemic snail from New Zealand
- Pseudosaphtia brunnea Winter, 2008
- Pyrgulopsis blainica Hershler, Liu & Gustafson, 2008
- Pyropelta ryukyuensis Sasaki, Okutani & Fujikura, 2008
- Selenochlamys ysbryda Rowson & Symondson, 2008, a presumably introduced species found in Wales
- Thapsia ebimimbangana Winter, 2008
- Thapsia wieringai Winter, 2008
- Saphtia granulosa Winter, 2008
- Saphtia lamtoensis Winter, 2008

Other taxa

- family Hokkaidoconchidae Kaim, Jenkins & Warén, 2008, common name hokkaidoconchids, an extinct family of deepwater sea snails.
- genus Pseudosaphtia Winter, 2008
- genus Saphtia Winter, 2008
- genus Vanmolia Winter, 2008

== 2009 ==
=== Marine species ===
from American Malacological Bulletin:

- Aclis kanela Absalão, 2009
- Adeuomphalus xerente Absalao, 2009
- Calliotropis pataxo Absalão, 2009
- Mirachelus urueuauau Absalão, 2009
- Palazzia pankakare Absalão, 2009
- Ponderinella xacriaba Absalão, 2009

from Journal of Molluscan Studies:

- Gemmuloborsonia clandestina Puillandre, Cruaud & Kantor, 2009

from Novapex:

- Astyris frumarkernorum García, 2009

from Zootaxa:

- Boonea scymnocelata Pimenta, Absalão & Miyaji, 2009
- Depressizona axiosculpta Geiger, 2009. The second species of these fossil vetigastropods was described from Tonga, and Depressizoninae was updated to the family level as Depressizonidae.
- Echinolittorina placida Reid, 2009 - Two other subgenera Lineolittorina Reid, 2009 and Amerolittorina Reid, 2009 are assigned in the genus Echinolittorina.
- Adalaria slavi Martynov, Korshunova, N. Sanamyan & K. Sanamyan, 2009
- Adalaria olgae Martynov, Korshunova, N. Sanamyan & K. Sanamyan, 2009
- Onchidoris macropompa Martynov, Korshunova, N. Sanamyan & K. Sanamyan, 2009
- Onchimira cavifera Martynov, Korshunova, N. Sanamyan & K. Sanamyan, 2009 and the new genus Onchimira Martynov, Korshunova, N. Sanamyan & K. Sanamyan, 2009
- Phyllodesmium karenae Moore & Gosliner, 2009
- Phyllodesmium pinnatum Moore & Gosliner, 2009
- Phyllodesmium tuberculatum Moore & Gosliner, 2009

from Gloria Maris:

- Rissoina harryleei Rolán & Fernández-Garcés, 2009

from The Raffles Bulletin of Zoology:

- Aiteng ater Swennen & Buatip, 2009; genus Aiteng Swennen & Buatip, 2009; family Aitengidae Swennen & Buatip, 2009

=== Brackish and freshwater species ===
New species

from Zoosystema

- Pseudunela espiritusanta Neusser & Schrödl, 2009 This species from Espiritu Santo Island in Vanuatu lives in brackish water while other two ones are marine.

from Molluscan Research

- Brotia annamita Köhler, Holford, Do & Ho, 2009
- Brotia hoabinhensis Köhler, Holford, Do & Ho, 2009
- Sulcospira collyra Köhler, Holford, Do & Ho, 2009
- Sulcospira dakrongensis Köhler, Holford, Do & Ho, 2009
- Sulcospira quangtriensis Köhler, Holford, Do & Ho, 2009
- Sulcospira vietnamensis Köhler, Holford, Do & Ho, 2009

=== Terrestrial species ===
from Journal of Conchology:

- Monacha oecali Hausdorf & Páll-Gergely, 2009

from Journal of Molluscan Studies

- Limax sarnensis Heim & Nitz, 2009

from Journal of Natural History:

- Plagiodontes weyrauchi Pizá & Cazzaniga, 2009

from Zootaxa:

- Crikey steveirwini Stanisic, 2009 and new genus Crikey Stanisic, 2009 (family Camaenidae) with only one species, from Australia, named in memory of wildlife expert Steve Irwin

from Zoological Journal of the Linnean Society:

- 11 new species of Everettia from Borneo.

from The Beagle:

- Torresitrachia alenae Willan, Köhler, Kessner & Braby, 2009
- Torresitrachia cuttacutta Willan, Köhler, Kessner & Braby, 2009
- Torresitrachia darwini Willan, Köhler, Kessner & Braby, 2009
- Torresitrachia wallacei Willan, Köhler, Kessner & Braby, 2009

=== Fossil species ===
from Bulletins of American Paleontology:

- Conus burnetti Hendricks, 2009

from Journal of Conchology:

- Bela trinacria Mariottini & Smriglio, 2009

== Discovered but undescribed ==
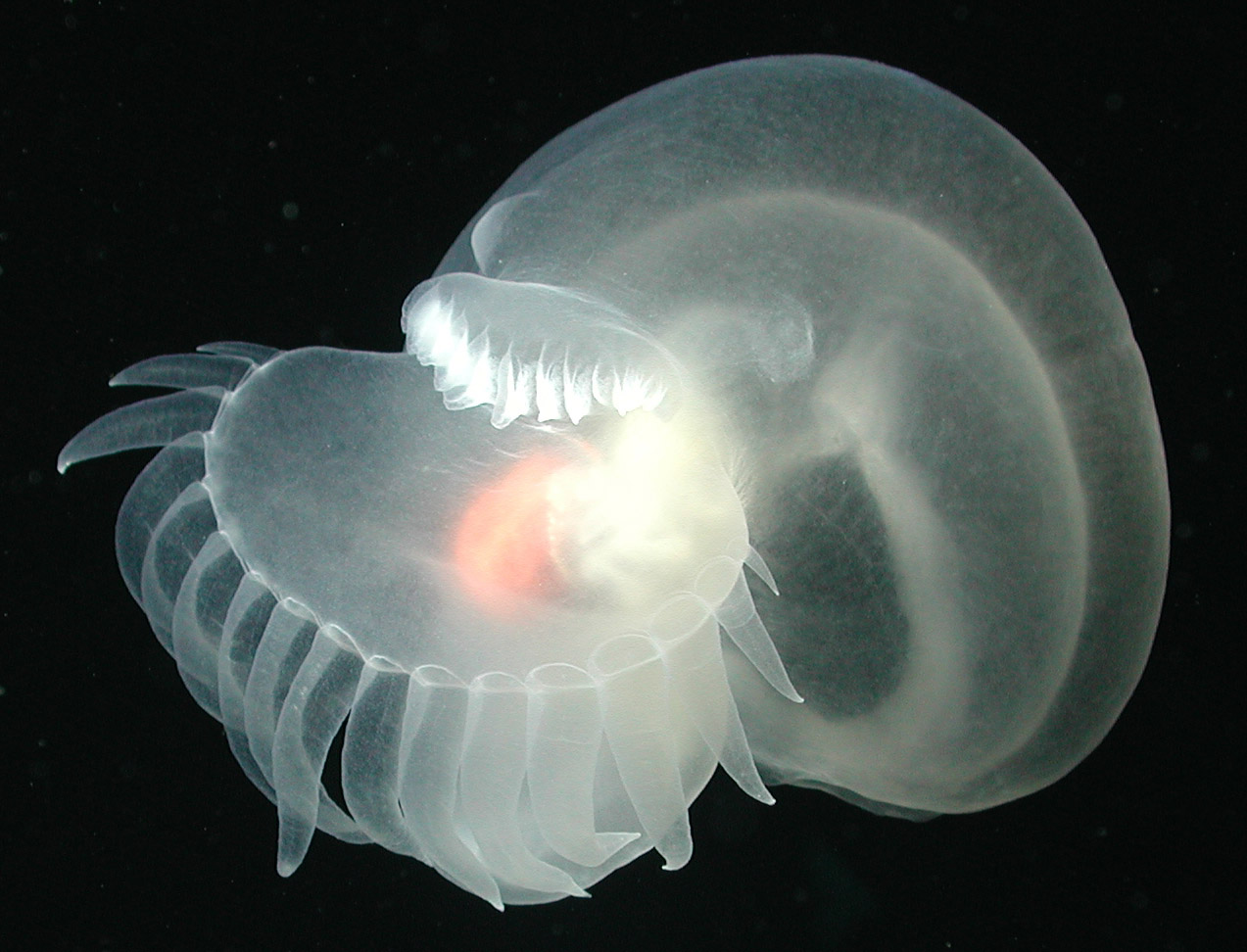
Undescribed nudibranch from Davidson Seamount, later described as Bathydevius.

Previously discovered but undescribed gastropod taxa include:

- Various undescribed species of Powelliphanta and one species of Wainuia sp. nov. are known from New Zealand.
- Hauffenia sp. nov. has been a problematic taxon at least since 1996.
- In 1998, an undescribed species of Pseudunela was noted from Lizard Island.

Discovered during this time period but still undescribed (as of 2009) gastropod taxa include:

- An undescribed nudibranch was photographed in 2002 at the Davidson Seamount in depths of 1,497 – 2,342 m. It would be described in 2024 as Bathydevius.
- Prophysaon an undescribed species from Siskiyou County, California from the year 2006.

== See also ==
- List of gastropods described in 2010
- Changes in the taxonomy of gastropods since 2005
