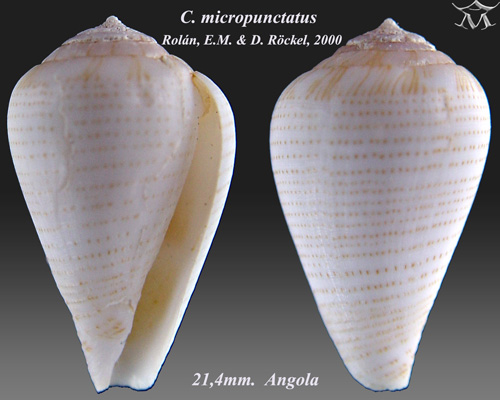
- Apertural and abapertural views of shell of Conus micropunctatus Rolán, E.M. & D. Röckel, 2000
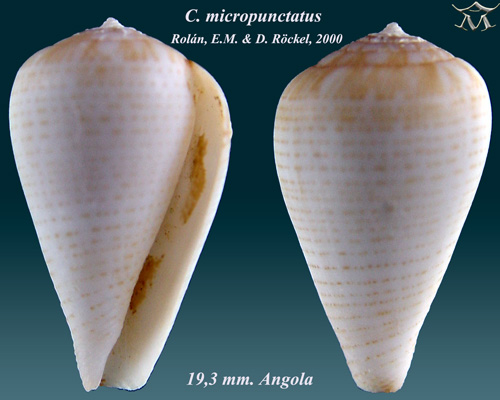

Conservation status
- Least Concern (IUCN 3.1)

Scientific classification
- Kingdom: Animalia
- Phylum: Mollusca
- Class: Gastropoda
- Subclass: Caenogastropoda
- Order: Neogastropoda
- Superfamily: Conoidea
- Family: Conidae
- Genus: Conus
- Species: C. micropunctatus

Binomial name
- Conus micropunctatus Rolán & Röckel, 2000

Synonyms
- Conus (Lautoconus) micropunctatus Rolán & Röckel, 2000 · accepted, alternate representation; Varioconus micropunctatus (Rolán & Röckel, 2000)

= Conus micropunctatus =

Species of sea snail

Conus micropunctatus is a species of sea snail, a marine gastropod mollusk in the family Conidae, the cone snails and their allies.

Like all species within the genus Conus, these snails are predatory and venomous. They are capable of stinging humans, therefore live ones should be handled carefully or not at all.

== Description ==
The size of the shell varies between 15 mm and 35 mm.

== Distribution ==
This species occurs in the Atlantic Ocean off Angola.
