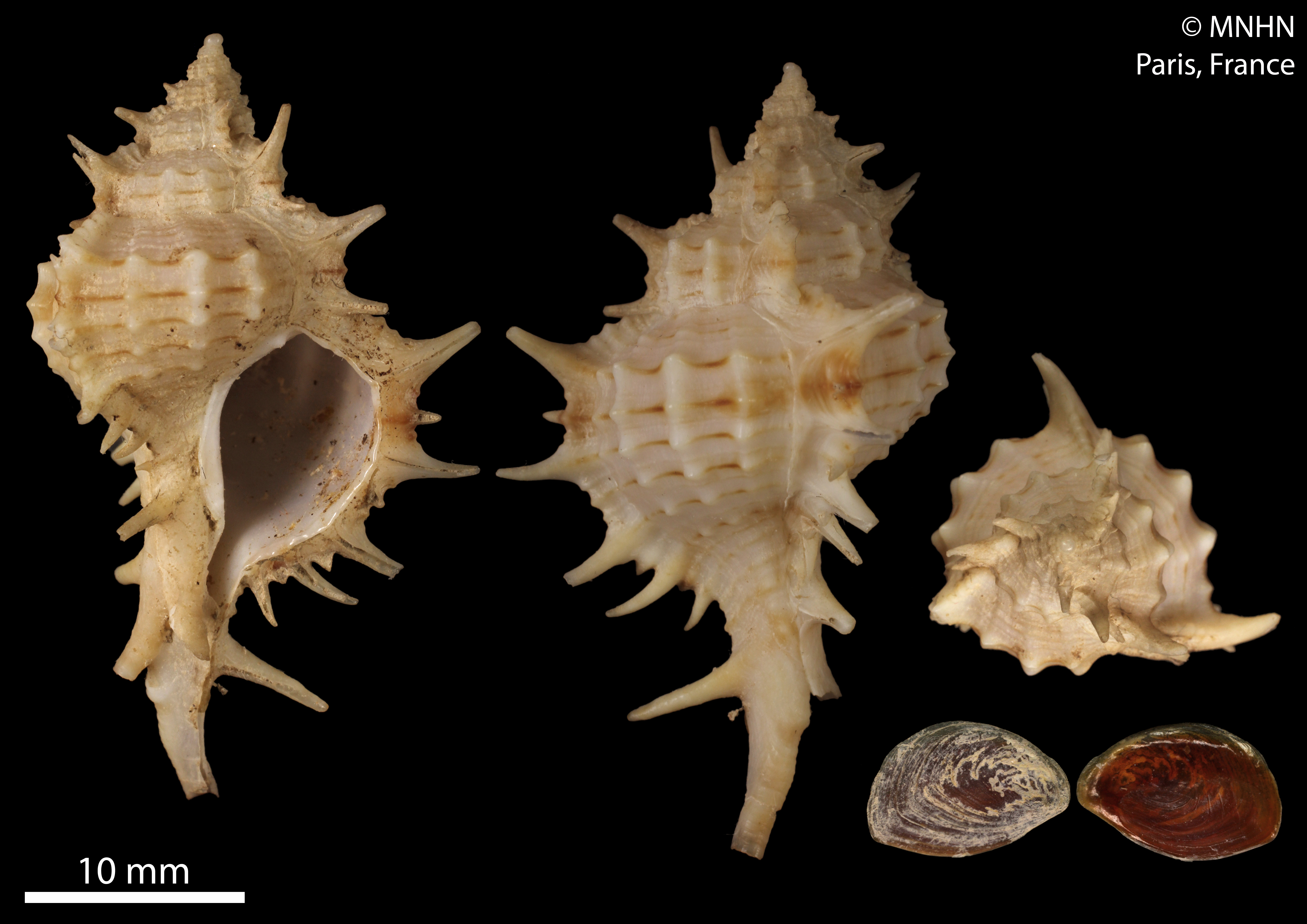
- Shell of Siratus guionneti (specimen at MNHN, Paris)

Scientific classification
- Kingdom: Animalia
- Phylum: Mollusca
- Class: Gastropoda
- Subclass: Caenogastropoda
- Order: Neogastropoda
- Family: Muricidae
- Genus: Siratus
- Species: S. guionneti

Binomial name
- Siratus guionneti (Merle, Garrigues & Pointier, 2001)

Synonyms
- Chicoreus (Siratus) guionneti Merle, Garrigues & Pointier, 2001; Chicoreus guionneti Merle, Garrigues & Pointier, 2001

= Siratus guionneti =

Species of gastropod

Siratus guionneti is a species of sea snail, a marine gastropod mollusk in the family Muricidae, the murex snails or rock snails.

== Description ==
The shell size varies between 35 mm and 65 mm.

== Distribution ==
This species occurs in the Caribbean Sea, Martinique, and the Lesser Antilles.
