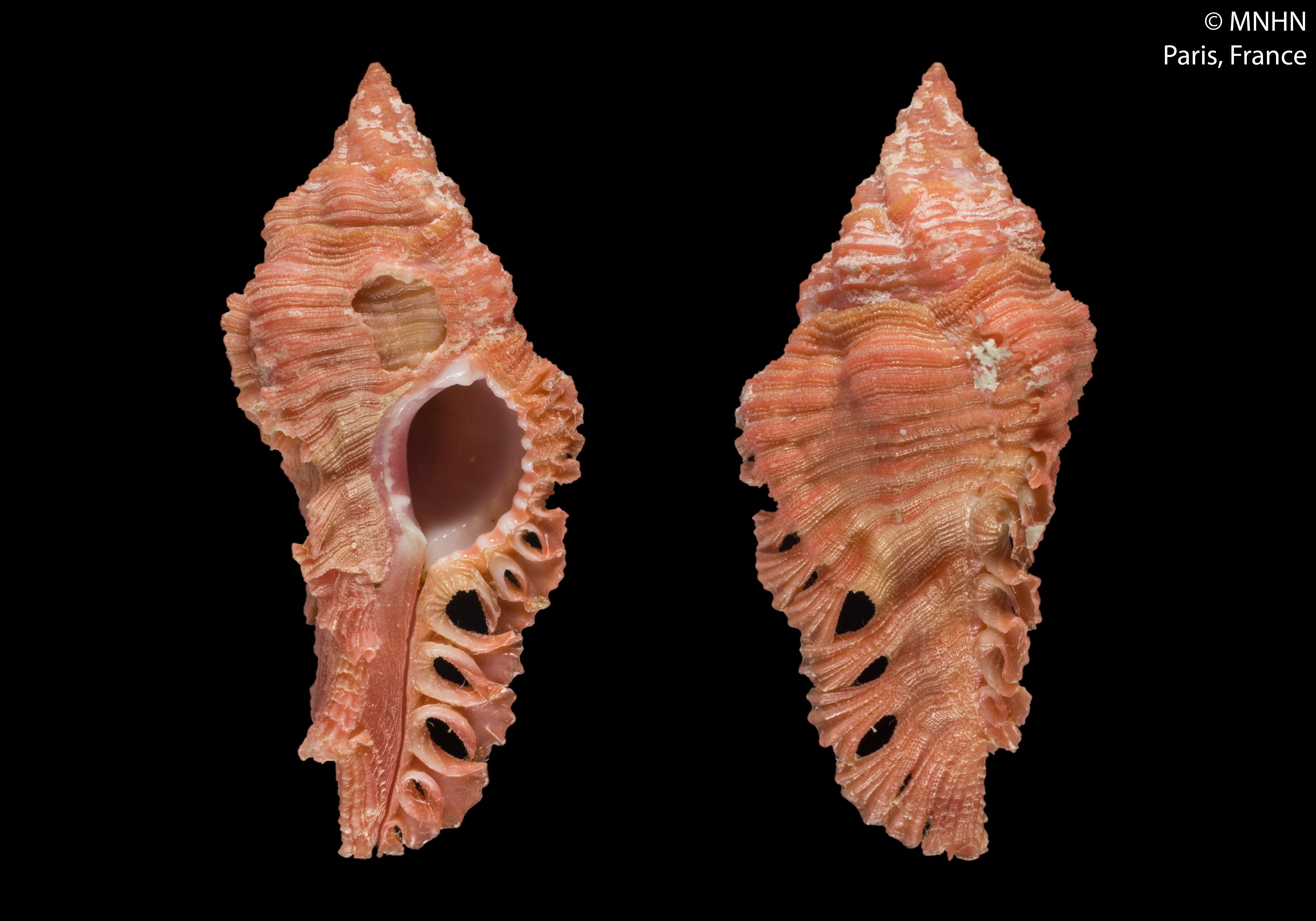
- Shell of Chicoreus pisori (holotype at MNHN, Paris)

Scientific classification
- Kingdom: Animalia
- Phylum: Mollusca
- Class: Gastropoda
- Subclass: Caenogastropoda
- Order: Neogastropoda
- Family: Muricidae
- Genus: Chicoreus
- Species: C. pisori

Binomial name
- Chicoreus pisori Houart, 2007

Synonyms
- Chicoreus (Triplex) pisori Houart, 2007· accepted, alternate representation

= Chicoreus pisori =

Species of gastropod

Chicoreus pisori is a species of sea snail, a marine gastropod mollusk in the family Muricidae, the murex snails or rock snails.

== Description ==
The length of the shell attains 35.9 mm.

== Distribution ==
This species occurs in the Pacific Ocean off Christmas Island.
