= Conus fijisulcatus =

Conservation status
- Least Concern (IUCN 3.1)

Scientific classification
- Kingdom: Animalia
- Phylum: Mollusca
- Class: Gastropoda
- Subclass: Caenogastropoda
- Order: Neogastropoda
- Superfamily: Conoidea
- Family: Conidae
- Genus: Conus
- Species: C. fijisulcatus

Binomial name
- Conus fijisulcatus Moolenbeek, Röckel & Bouchet, 2008

Synonyms
- Asprella fijisulcata (Moolenbeek, Röckel & Bouchet, 2008); Conus (Asprella) fijisulcatus Moolenbeek, Röckel & Bouchet, 2008 · accepted, alternate representation

Species of sea snail

Conus fijisulcatus is a species of sea snail, a marine gastropod mollusk in the family Conidae, the cone snails and their allies.

Like all species within the genus Conus, these snails are predatory and venomous. They are capable of stinging humans, therefore live ones should be handled carefully or not at all.

== Description ==
The size of the shell varies between 18 mm and 55 mm.

== Distribution ==
This marine species occurs in the Pacific Ocean off Fiji.
