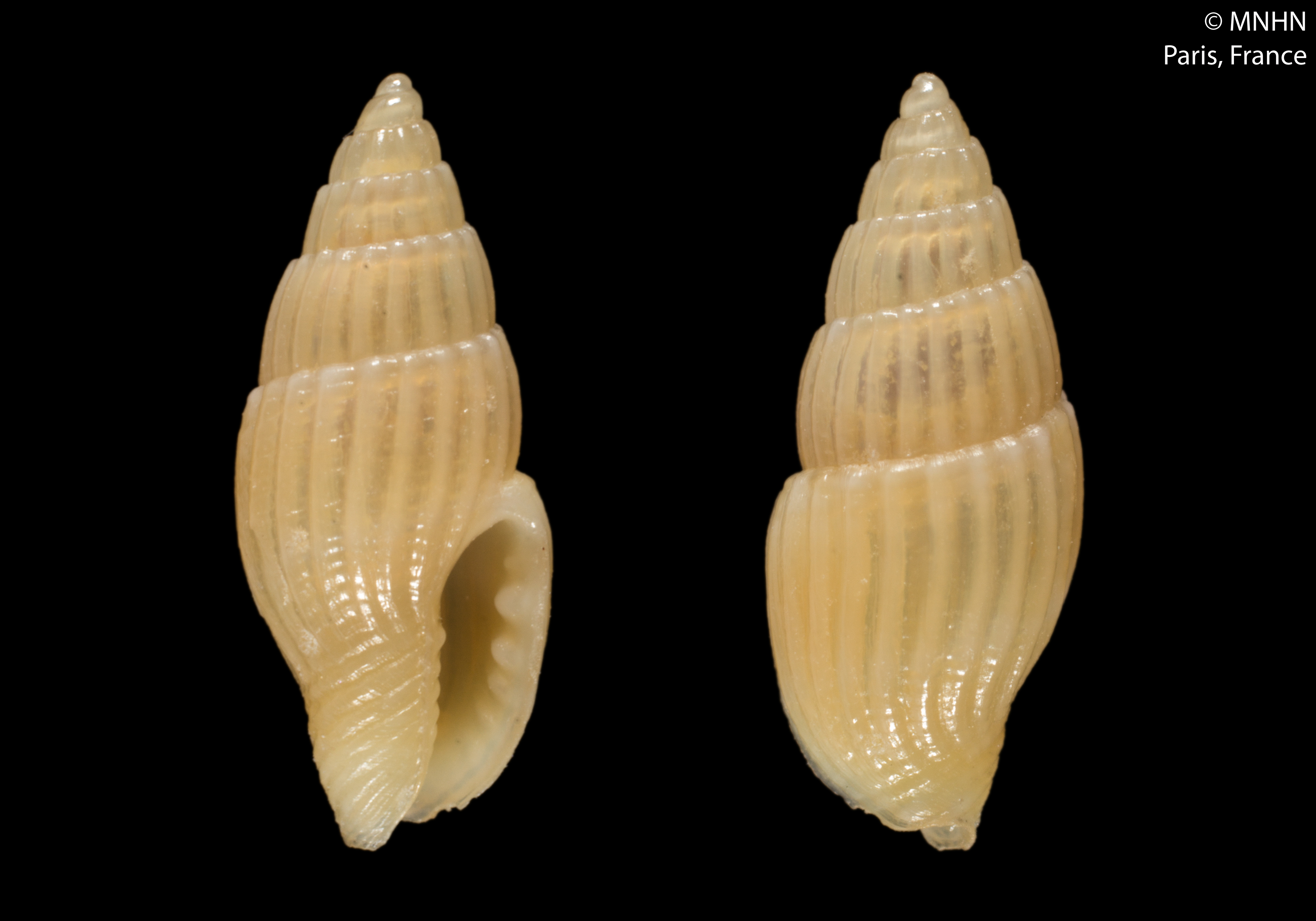
- Shell of Anachis ryalli (holotype at MNHN, Paris)

Scientific classification
- Kingdom: Animalia
- Phylum: Mollusca
- Class: Gastropoda
- Subclass: Caenogastropoda
- Order: Neogastropoda
- Family: Columbellidae
- Genus: Anachis
- Species: A. ryalli

Binomial name
- Anachis ryalli Rolan, 2005

= Anachis ryalli =

Species of gastropod

Anachis ryalli is a species of sea snail in the family Columbellidae, the dove snails.

== Description ==
The length of the shell attains 6.2 mm.

== Distribution ==
This marine species occurs in the Gulf of Guinea off Ghana.
