= Mitrella tenebrosa =

Scientific classification
- Kingdom: Animalia
- Phylum: Mollusca
- Class: Gastropoda
- Subclass: Caenogastropoda
- Order: Neogastropoda
- Family: Columbellidae
- Genus: Mitrella
- Species: M. tenebrosa

Binomial name
- Mitrella tenebrosa Rolan, 2005

Species of gastropod

Mitrella tenebrosa is a species of sea snail in the family Columbellidae, the dove snails. Its specific name tenebrosa refers to its dark colour.

== Distribution and habitat ==
The species is endemic São Tomé Island where it may occur at depths greater than 15–20 m.
