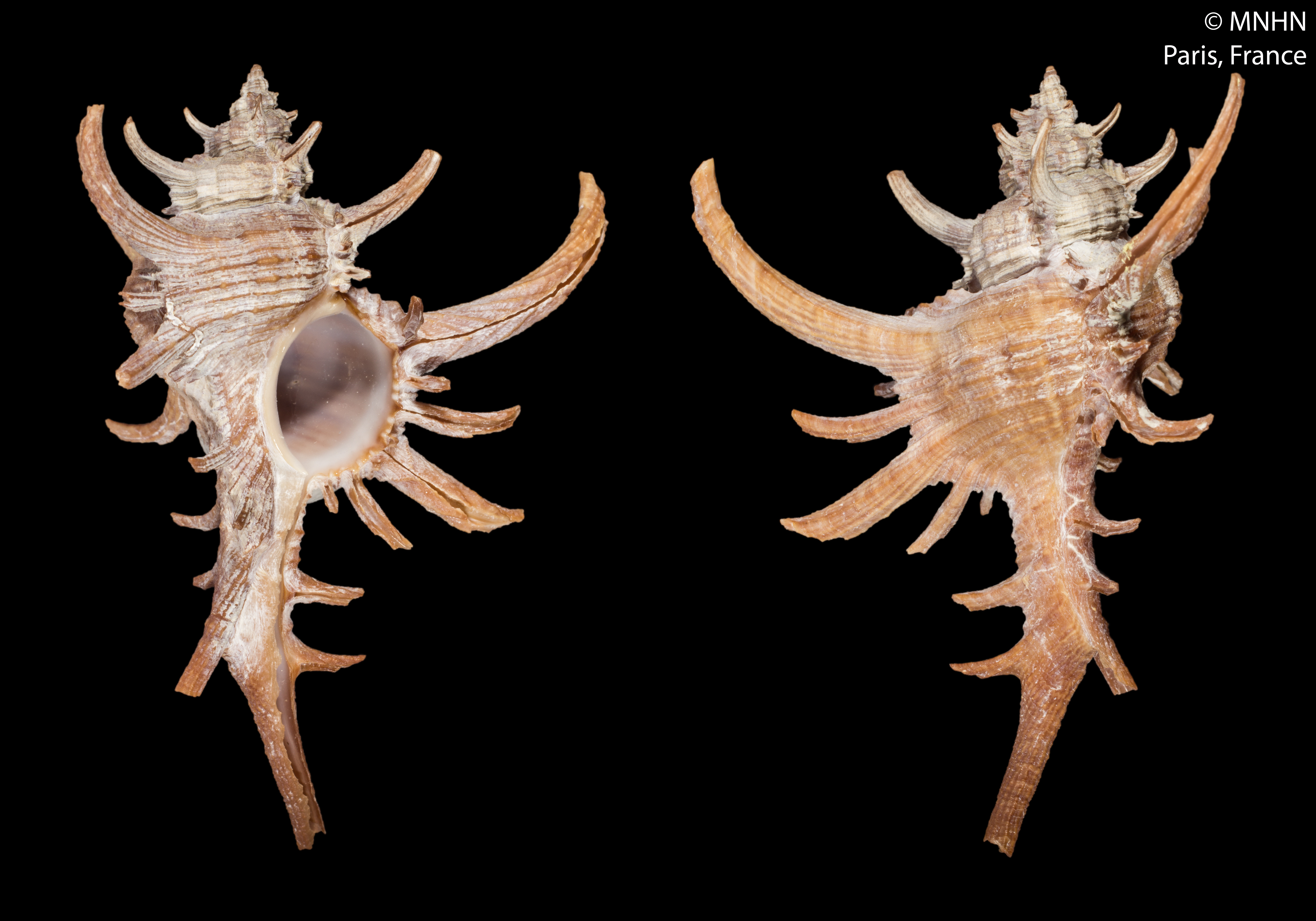

Scientific classification
- Kingdom: Animalia
- Phylum: Mollusca
- Class: Gastropoda
- Subclass: Caenogastropoda
- Order: Neogastropoda
- Family: Muricidae
- Genus: Chicoreus
- Species: C. setionoi

Binomial name
- Chicoreus setionoi Houart, 2001

Synonyms
- Chicoreus (Triplex) setionoi Houart, 2001· accepted, alternate representation

= Chicoreus setionoi =

Species of gastropod

Chicoreus setionoi is a species of sea snail, a marine gastropod mollusk in the family Muricidae, the murex snails or rock snails.

== Distribution ==
This species occurs in the Arafura Sea.
