= Islamia laiae =

Scientific classification
- Kingdom: Animalia
- Phylum: Mollusca
- Class: Gastropoda
- Subclass: Caenogastropoda
- Order: Littorinimorpha
- Family: Hydrobiidae
- Genus: Islamia
- Species: I. laiae

Binomial name
- Islamia laiae Altaba, 2007

Species of gastropod

Islamia laiae is a species of small freshwater snail with a gill and an operculum, an aquatic gastropod mollusk in the family Hydrobiidae.

== Distribution ==
This species occurs in Mallorca.
