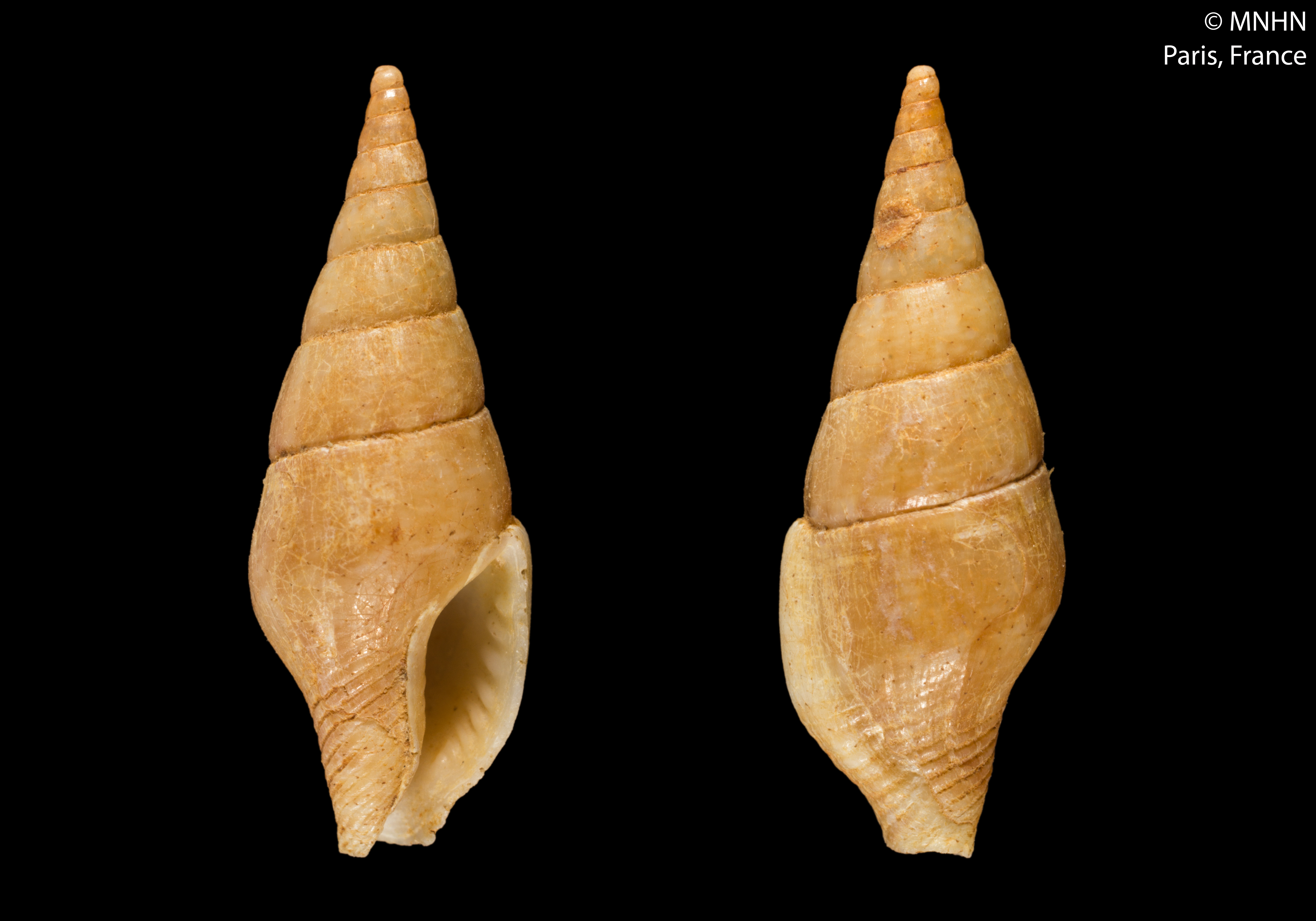
- Shell of Mitrella condei (holotype at MNHN, Paris)

Scientific classification
- Kingdom: Animalia
- Phylum: Mollusca
- Class: Gastropoda
- Subclass: Caenogastropoda
- Order: Neogastropoda
- Family: Columbellidae
- Genus: Mitrella
- Species: M. condei

Binomial name
- Mitrella condei Rolan, 2005

= Mitrella condei =

Species of gastropod

Mitrella condei is a species of sea snail, a marine gastropod mollusk in the family Columbellidae, the dove snails.

== Description ==
The shell reaches a length of about 16.5 mm. A paucispiral protoconch (~1 whorl; diameter ~700 μm) was noted for the species in comparison with related taxa, based on Rolán's figures.

== Distribution ==
This marine species is known from the Atlantic Ocean off Angola.

== Type material ==
The holotype (MNHN-IM-2000-7034) is deposited in the Muséum national d'Histoire naturelle, Paris. It was dredged off Moçâmedes (Praia Amélia), Angola, at a depth of about 50 m.
