= Calliostoma houarti =

Scientific classification
- Kingdom: Animalia
- Phylum: Mollusca
- Class: Gastropoda
- Subclass: Vetigastropoda
- Order: Trochida
- Family: Calliostomatidae
- Genus: Calliostoma
- Species: C. houarti

Binomial name
- Calliostoma houarti Vilvens, 2000

Synonyms
- Calliostoma (Calliostoma) houarti Vilvens, 2000

Species of gastropod

Calliostoma houarti is a species of sea snail, a marine gastropod mollusk in the family Calliostomatidae.

Some authors place this taxon in the subgenus Calliostoma (Fautor).

== Description ==
The size of the shell varies between 7 mm and 25 mm.

== Distribution ==
This marine species occurs off the Philippines.
