= Parthenina dekkeri =

Scientific classification
- Kingdom: Animalia
- Phylum: Mollusca
- Class: Gastropoda
- Family: Pyramidellidae
- Genus: Parthenina
- Species: P. dekkeri

Binomial name
- Parthenina dekkeri (van Aartsen, Gittenberger E. & Goud, 2000)

Synonyms
- Chrysallida (Parthenina) dekkeri van Aartsen, Gittenberger & Goud, 2000

Species of gastropod

Parthenina dekkeri is a species of sea snail, a marine gastropod mollusk in the family Pyramidellidae, the pyrams and their allies.
