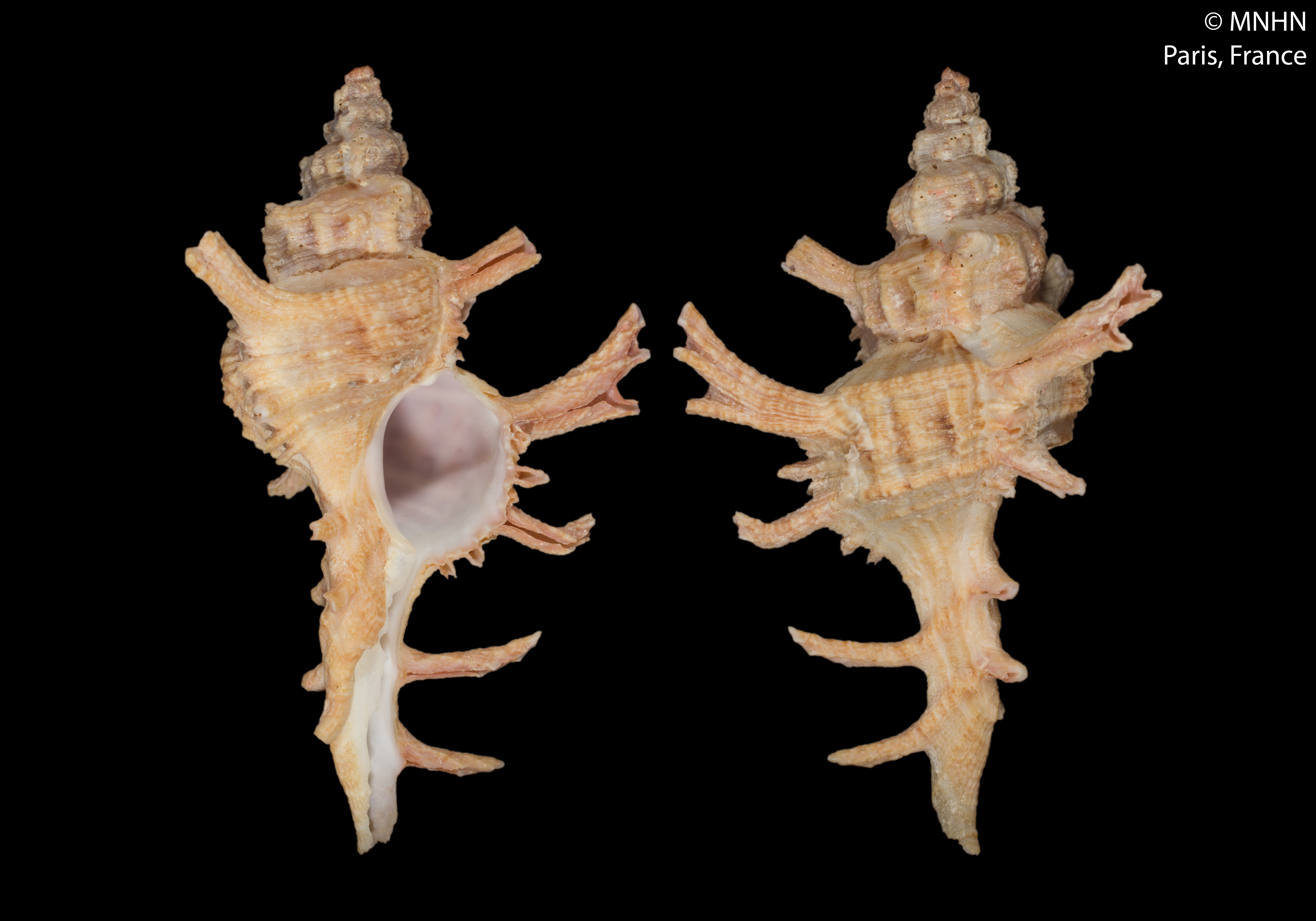
- Shell of Chicoreus allaryi (holotype at MNHN, Paris)

Scientific classification
- Kingdom: Animalia
- Phylum: Mollusca
- Class: Gastropoda
- Subclass: Caenogastropoda
- Order: Neogastropoda
- Family: Muricidae
- Genus: Chicoreus
- Species: C. allaryi

Binomial name
- Chicoreus allaryi Houart, Quiquandon & Briano, 2004

Synonyms
- Chicoreus (Triplex) allaryi Houart, Quiquandon & Briano, 2004· accepted, alternate representation

= Chicoreus allaryi =

Species of gastropod

Chicoreus allaryi is a species of sea snail, a marine gastropod mollusk in the family Muricidae, the murex snails or rock snails.

== Description ==
Size 7–11 cm.

== Distribution ==
This marine species occurs off Madagascar
