= Mitrella saotomensis =

Scientific classification
- Kingdom: Animalia
- Phylum: Mollusca
- Class: Gastropoda
- Subclass: Caenogastropoda
- Order: Neogastropoda
- Family: Columbellidae
- Genus: Mitrella
- Species: M. saotomensis

Binomial name
- Mitrella saotomensis Rolan, 2005

Species of gastropod

Mitrella saotomensis is a species of sea snail in the family Columbellidae, the dove snails. This species is endemic to the island of São Tomé. The specific name saotomensis refers to the island where it was collected.
