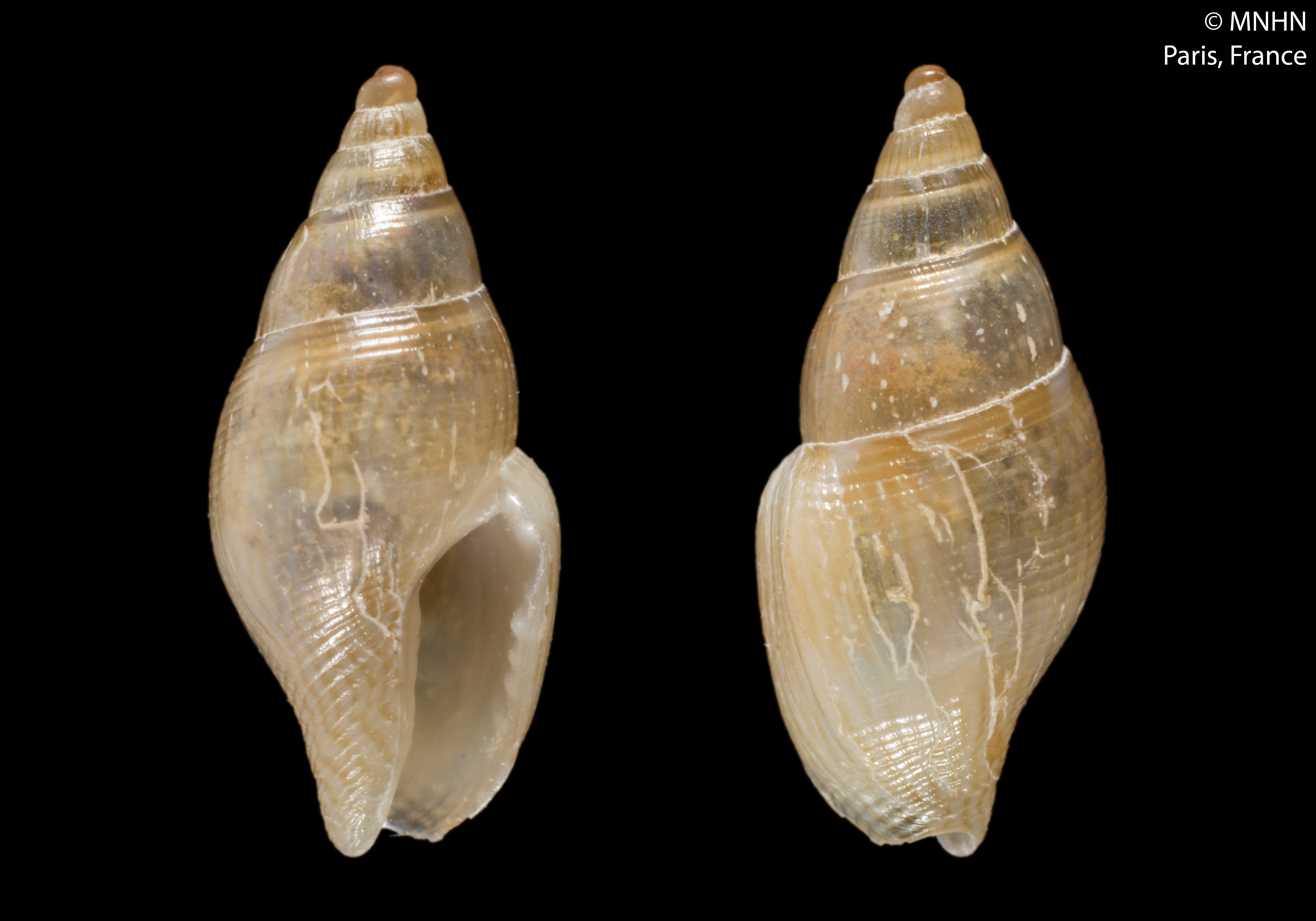
- Shell of Mitrella inflata (holotype at MNHN, Paris)

Scientific classification
- Kingdom: Animalia
- Phylum: Mollusca
- Class: Gastropoda
- Subclass: Caenogastropoda
- Order: Neogastropoda
- Family: Columbellidae
- Genus: Mitrella
- Species: M. inflata

Binomial name
- Mitrella inflata Pelorce & Boyer, 2005

= Mitrella inflata =

Species of gastropod

Mitrella inflata is a species of sea snail in the family Columbellidae, the dove snails.

== Description ==
The length of the shell attains 6.4 mm.

== Distribution ==
This marine species occurs off Senegal.
