= Pyrgulina vanderlindeni =

Scientific classification
- Kingdom: Animalia
- Phylum: Mollusca
- Class: Gastropoda
- Family: Pyramidellidae
- Genus: Pyrgulina
- Species: P. vanderlindeni

Binomial name
- Pyrgulina vanderlindeni (van Aartsen, Gittenberger & Goud, 2000)

Synonyms
- Chrysallida (Pyrgulina) vanderlindeni van Aartsen, Gittenberger & Goud, 2000

Species of gastropod

Pyrgulina vanderlindeni is a species of sea snail, a marine gastropod mollusk in the family Pyramidellidae, the pyrams and their allies.

== Distribution ==
This species occurs in the following locations:

- Cape Verde archipelago
