= Mitrella inesitae =

Scientific classification
- Kingdom: Animalia
- Phylum: Mollusca
- Class: Gastropoda
- Subclass: Caenogastropoda
- Order: Neogastropoda
- Family: Columbellidae
- Genus: Mitrella
- Species: M. inesitae

Binomial name
- Mitrella inesitae Rolán, 2005

Species of sea snail

Mitrella inesitae is a species of sea snail in the family Columbellidae, the dove snails.

== Distribution ==
The species is endemic to the island of São Tomé, São Tomé e Príncipe.
