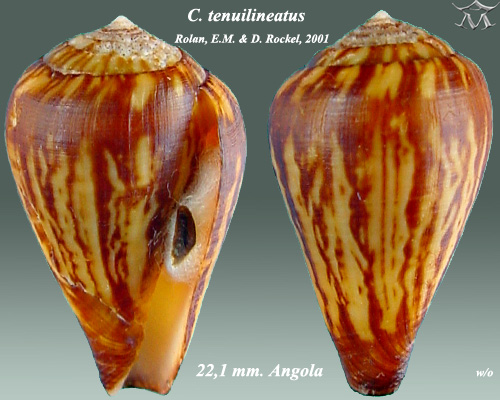
- Apertural and abapertural views of shell of Conus tenuilineatus Rolan, E.M. & D. Rockel, 2001

Conservation status
- Least Concern (IUCN 3.1)

Scientific classification
- Kingdom: Animalia
- Phylum: Mollusca
- Class: Gastropoda
- Subclass: Caenogastropoda
- Order: Neogastropoda
- Superfamily: Conoidea
- Family: Conidae
- Genus: Conus
- Species: C. tenuilineatus

Binomial name
- Conus tenuilineatus Rolán & Röckel, 2001

Synonyms
- Conus (Lautoconus) tenuilineatus Rolán & Röckel, 2001 · accepted, alternate representation; Varioconus tenuilineatus (Rolán & Röckel, 2001)

= Conus tenuilineatus =

Species of sea snail

Conus tenuilineatus is a species of sea snail, a marine gastropod mollusc in the family Conidae, the cone snails and their allies.

Like all species within the genus Conus, these snails are predatory and venomous. They are capable of stinging and injecting humans with their jagged spear-like tooth after extending a tubular proboscis. This venom induces paralyzing effects, therefore live ones should be handled carefully or not at all.

== Description ==
The size of the shell varies between 18 mm and 29 mm, and are of least concern regarding extinction (2001). Ground colour of shell is white or light brown tinted with wavy or straight, brown, hair-lines from spire to base, flowing together at shoulder and base, occasionally punctated and forming traces of a spiral-band at the central area. Specimens from Santa Maria and Canoco may have light bluish-white ground colour and a light violet aperture with two white bands at centre and shoulder.

== Distribution ==
This species occurs in the Atlantic Ocean off Angola.
