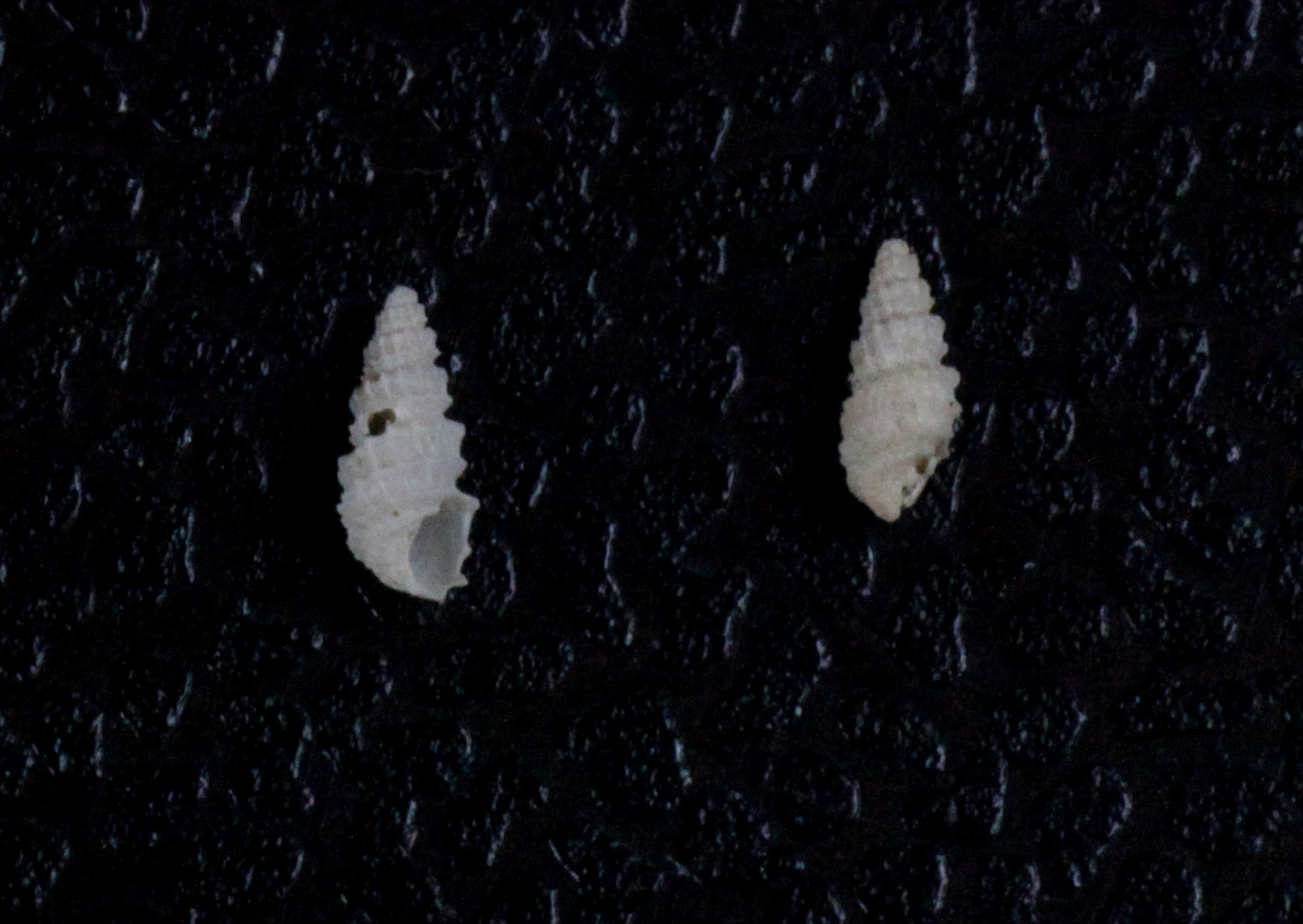
- Chrysallida navisa shell

Scientific classification
- Kingdom: Animalia
- Phylum: Mollusca
- Class: Gastropoda
- Subcohort: Panpulmonata
- Superfamily: Pyramidelloidea
- Family: Pyramidellidae
- Genus: Chrysallida; Carpenter, 1856

Type species
- Chrysallida communis C.B. Adams, 1852

Synonyms
- Burkillia Iredale, 1915 (unnecessary replacement name for Tragula Monterosato, 1884); Chrysallida (Pyrgulina) A. Adams, 1864; Elodia de Folin, 1870; Elodiamea de Folin, 1886; Ividella Dall & Bartsch, 1909; Odostomia (Chrysallida) Carpenter, 1856; Partulida Schaufuss, 1869

= Chrysallida =

Genus of gastropods

Chrysallida is a speciose genus of minute sea snails, pyramidellid gastropod mollusks or micromollusks in the family Pyramidellidae within the tribe Chrysallidini.

== Taxonomy ==
The genus Folinella had two preoccupied names - Amoura De Folin, 1873 not J.E. Gray 1847, and Funicularia Monterosato, 1884 not Forbes, 1845.

The genus Chrysallida Carpenter, 1856 has been used as a catchall, particularly in the European literature following a lead by Winckworth (1932), for most pyramidellids having both axial and spiral sculpture but having otherwise little in common with the Californian type species C. communis (C. B. Adams, 1852). A statement that this is incorrect was voiced by van Aartsen, Gittenberger & Goud (2000: 21) who nevertheless still used Chrysallida as the genus to include many Eastern Atlantic species, distributed into several subgenera. Micali, Nofroni & Perna (2012) restored usage of Parthenina Bucquoy, Dautzenberg & Dollfus, 1883 for several species formerly placed in Chrysallida. This move was continued by Høisæter (2014), Peñas, Rolán & Swinnen (2014) and Giannuzzi-Savelli et al. (2014) who are here followed, but there are still many species remaining unduly under Chrysallida. For these, we have refrained from making new combinations not backed by (or implicit from) a published source. Nevertheless, all the species that were already "accepted" under a subgenus, now raised to full genus, have been marked as "accepted" under that full genus.

== Distribution ==
Species within the genus Chrysallida are commonly distributed in all oceans from the tropics to the polar regions, the Arctic and the Antarctic. It is mainly known from coastal areas, and is uncommon in deep elevations such as trenches in the sea.

The members of Chrysallida are ectoparasites on serpulid polychaetes.

== Species ==
There are multiple species within the genus Chrysallida, these include the following in alphabetical order:

- Chrysallida affinis (Laseron, 1959)
- Chrysallida africana van Aartsen & Corgan, 1996
- Chrysallida angusta Carpenter, 1864
- Chrysallida annobonensis Peñas & Rolán, 2002
- Chrysallida asiatica Corgan, 1970
- Chrysallida australis Thiele, 1930
- Chrysallida bellula A. Adams, 1860
- Chrysallida bjoernssoni Warén, 1991
- Chrysallida boucheti Peñas & Rolán, 1999
- Chrysallida caelatura (Laseron, 1951)
- Chrysallida canariensis Nordsieck & Talavera, 1979
- Chrysallida cancellata (d'Orbigny, 1841)
- † Chrysallida cantaurana Landau & LaFollette, 2015
- Chrysallida carpinei van Aartsen, Gittenberger & Goud, 2000
- Chrysallida castleraghensis Saurin, 1959
- Chrysallida chetelati Saurin, 1962
- Chrysallida communis (C.B. Adams, 1852)
- Chrysallida conifera Pimenta, 2012
- Chrysallida connexa (Dautzenberg, 1912)
- Chrysallida costellata A. Adams, 1861
- Chrysallida culaoniana Saurin, 1959
- † Chrysallida curvicostata (Grant-Mackie & Chapman-Smith, 1971)
- Chrysallida declivata (Laseron, 1959)
- Chrysallida decorata (Philippi, 1849)
- Chrysallida dux (Dall & Bartsch, 1906)
- † Chrysallida eocenica (Laws, 1941)
- Chrysallida epitonoides van Aartsen, Gittenberger E. & Goud, 2000
- Chrysallida erucella A. Adams, 1863
- Chrysallida eugeniae Peñas & Rolán, 1998
- Chrysallida fenestrata (Jeffreys, 1848)
- Chrysallida foveata Robba, Di Geronimo, Chaimanee, Negri & Sanfilippo, 2004
- Chrysallida foveolata (A. Adams, 1860)
- Chrysallida galbula A. Adams, 1863
- Chrysallida gemmulosa (C. B. Adams, 1850)
- Chrysallida genouillyi Saurin, 1962
- Chrysallida gitzelsi van Aartsen, Gittenberger & Goud, 2000
- Chrysallida gubbiolii Peñas & Rolán, 1998
- Chrysallida gunnamatta (Laseron, 1951)
- Chrysallida herosae Peñas & Rolán, 1998
- Chrysallida hoeisaeteri Warén, 1991
- Chrysallida hoenselaari van Aartsen, Gittenberger & Goud, 2000
- Chrysallida honnorati Saurin, 1959
- Chrysallida horii van Aartsen, gittenberger & Goud, 2000
- Chrysallida impercepta Schander, 1994
- Chrysallida indistincta (Henn & Brazier, 1894)
- Chrysallida innocua Corgan, 1970
- Chrysallida insularis (Oliver, 1915)
- Chrysallida intorta Hoffman & Freiwald, 2017
- Chrysallida intumescens Schander, 1994
- Chrysallida kesteveni (Hedley, 1907)
- Chrysallida kymatodes (Watson, 1886)
- Chrysallida leoni Fernández-Garcés, Peñas & Rolán, 2011
- Chrysallida littoralis (A. Adams, 1861)
- Chrysallida lucida (Laseron, 1950)
- Chrysallida maoria (Powell, 1940)
- Chrysallida mayii (Tate, 1898)
- Chrysallida mcmillanae van Aartsen, Gittenberger & Goud, 2000
- Chrysallida medialuna Faber, 2008
- Chrysallida megembryon Saurin, 1958
- Chrysallida menkhorsti van Aartsen, Gittenberger E. & Goud, 2000
- Chrysallida metula A. Adams, 1860
- Chrysallida minna A. Adams, 1860
- Chrysallida minutissima (Dautzenberg & H. Fischer, 1906)
- Chrysallida mirationis (Laseron, 1959)
- Chrysallida multicostata (Laseron, 1959)
- Chrysallida multituberculata (Castellanos, 1982)
- Chrysallida munda A. Adams, 1860
- Chrysallida nana (A. Adams, 1861)
- Chrysallida navisa (Dall & Bartsch, 1907)
- Chrysallida nioba (Dall & Bartsch, 1911)
- Chrysallida ovalis Thiele, 1930
- Chrysallida pelorcei Peñas & Rolán, 1998
- Chrysallida phanthietina Saurin, 1958
- Chrysallida projectura (Laseron, 1959)
- Chrysallida pura (Saurin, 1962)
- Chrysallida pusio A. Adams, 1861
- Chrysallida pygmaea A. Adams, 1861
- Chrysallida pyrgulina Peñas & Rolán, 1998
- Chrysallida ryalli Peñas & Rolán, 2002
- Chrysallida saurini Robba, Di Geronimo, Chaimanee, Negri & Sanfilippo, 2004
- Chrysallida seamounti Peñas & Rolán, 1999
- Chrysallida semiplicata A. Adams, 1860
- Chrysallida semipunctata Nomura, 1937
- Chrysallida sibana (Yokoyama, 1927)
- Chrysallida simulans (Chaster, 1898) (taxon inquirendum)
- Chrysallida sixtoi Peñas & Rolán, 1998
- Chrysallida spiralis (Laseron, 1959)
- Chrysallida stefanisi (Jeffreys, 1869)
- Chrysallida stupa Hori & Fukuda, 1999
- Chrysallida sublustris (Friele, 1886)
- Chrysallida subtantilla Golikov in Golikov & Scarlato, 1967
- Chrysallida terebra A. Adams, 1861
- Chrysallida thetisae Espinosa & Ortea, 2011
- Chrysallida trachis (Dall & Bartsch, 1909)
- Chrysallida tribulationis (Hedley, 1909)
- Chrysallida trifuniculata (Saurin, 1962)
- Chrysallida turbonillaeformis van Aartsen, Gittenberger & Goud, 2000
- Chrysallida typica (Laseron, 1959)
- Chrysallida vanbruggeni van Aartsen & Corgan, 1996
- Chrysallida verdensis Peñas & Rolán, 1998
- Chrysallida vignali (Lamy, 1910)
- Chrysallida vincentina (Tryon, 1886)
- Chrysallida vincula (Laseron, 1951)
- Chrysallida zea (Hedley, 1902)
- † Chrysallida zecarinata Laws, 1948

== Synonyms ==
The following species were brought into synonymy

List of synonyms
- Chrysallida alleryi (Kobelt, 1903): synonym of Parthenina monterosatii (Clessin, 1900)
- Chrysallida angulosa (Monterosato, 1889): synonym of Parthenina angulosa (Monterosato, 1889)
- Chrysallida anselmoi Peñas & Rolán, 1998: synonym of Parthenina anselmoi (Peñas & Rolán, 1998)
- Chrysallida antimaiae Schander, 1994: synonym of Parthenina obesa (Dautzenberg, 1912)
- Chrysallida approximans (Dautzenberg, 1912): synonym of Kongsrudia approximans (Dautzenberg, 1912)
- Chrysallida brattstroemi Warén, 1991: synonym of Parthenina brattstroemi (Warén, 1991)
- Chrysallida brevicula (Jeffreys, 1883): synonym of Turbonilla amoena (Monterosato, 1878)
- Chrysallida brusinai (Cossmann, 1921): synonym of Spiralinella incerta (Milaschewitsch, 1916)
- Chrysallida buijsei De Jong & Coomans, 1988: synonym of Fargoa bushiana (Bartsch, 1909)
- Chrysallida casta A. Adams, 1861: synonym of Pyrgulina casta (A. Adams, 1861)
- Chrysallida clathrata (Jeffreys, 1848): synonym of Parthenina clathrata (Jeffreys, 1848)
- Chrysallida columna: synonym of Pyrgulina columna (Laseron, 1959)
- Chrysallida colungiana F. Nordsieck, 1972: synonym of Parthenina dollfusi (Kobelt, 1903)
- Chrysallida consobrina A. Adams, 1861: synonym of Pyrgulina consobrina (A. Adams, 1861)
- Chrysallida convexa (Carpenter, 1857): synonym of Besla convexa (Carpenter, 1857)
- Chrysallida dantarti Peñas & Rolán, 2008: synonym of Parthenina dantarti (Peñas & Rolán, 2008)
- Chrysallida decussata (Montagu, 1803): synonym of Parthenina decussata (Montagu, 1803)
- Chrysallida dekkeri van Aartsen, Gittenberger E. & Goud, 2000: synonym of Parthenina dekkeri (van Aartsen, Gittenberger & Goud, 2000)
- Chrysallida dimidiata Schander, 1994: synonym of Pyrgulina dimidiata (Schander, 1994)
- Chrysallida doliolum (Philippi, 1844): synonym of Odostomella doliolum (Philippi, 1844)
- Chrysallida dollfusi (Kobelt, 1903): synonym of Parthenina dollfusi (Kobelt, 1903)
- Chrysallida elegans (de Folin, 1870): synonym of Liamorpha elegans (de Folin, 1870)
- Chrysallida emaciata (Brusina, 1866): synonym of Parthenina emaciata (Brusina, 1866)
- Chrysallida ersei Schander, 1994: synonym of Kongsrudia ersei (Schander, 1994)
- Chrysallida excavata (Philippi, 1836): synonym of Folinella excavata (Phillippi, 1836)
- Chrysallida eximia (Jeffreys, 1849): synonym of Parthenina eximia (Jeffreys, 1849)
- Chrysallida faberi van Aartsen, Gittenberger & Goud, 2000: synonym of Parthenina faberi (van Aartsen, Gittenberger & Goud, 2000)
- Chrysallida falcifera (Watson, 1881): synonym of Tragula falcifera (Watson, 1881)
- Chrysallida farolita F. Nordsieck, 1972: synonym of Parthenina interstincta (Adams J., 1797)
- Chrysallida feldi van Aartsen, Gittenberger & Goud, 2000: synonym of Parthenina feldi (van Aartsen, Gittenberger & Goud, 2000)
- Chrysallida fenestrata (Jeffreys, 1848): synonym of Tragula fenestrata (Jeffreys, 1848)
- Chrysallida fischeri (Hornung & Mermod, 1925): synonym of Pyrgulina fischeri Hornung & Mermod, 1925
- Chrysallida flexuosa (Monterosato, 1874): synonym of Parthenina flexuosa (Monterosato, 1874)
- Chrysallida gabmulderi van Aartsen, Gittenberger & Goud, 2000: synonym of Parthenina gabmulderi (van Aartsen, Gittenberger & Goud, 2000)
- Chrysallida ghisottii (van Aartsen, 1984): synonym of Folinella ghisottii van Aartsen, 1984
- Chrysallida gruveli (Dautzenberg, 1910): synonym of Kongsrudia gruveli (Dautzenberg, 1910)
- Chrysallida humilis (Preston, 1905): synonym of Quirella humilis (Preston, 1905)
- Chrysallida incerta (Milaschewitsch, 1916): synonym of Spiralinella incerta (Milaschewich, 1916)
- Chrysallida inconspicua A. Adams, 1861: synonym of Chrysallida innocua Corgan, 1970
- Chrysallida indistincta (Montagu, 1808): synonym of Parthenina indistincta (Montagu, 1808)
- Chrysallida intermixta (Monterosato, 1884): synonym of Parthenina monozona (Brusina, 1869)
- Chrysallida interspatiosa van der Linden & Eikenboom, 1992: synonym of Parthenina flexuosa (Monterosato, 1874)
- Chrysallida interstincta (Adams J., 1797): synonym of Parthenina interstincta (J. Adams, 1797)
- Chrysallida jadisi (Olsson & McGinty, 1958): synonym of Boonea jadisi (Olsson & McGinty, 1958)
- Chrysallida jeffreysiana (Monterosato, 1884): synonym of Trabecula jeffreysiana Monterosato, 1884
- Chrysallida jordii Peñas & Rolán, 1998: synonym of Folinella moolenbeeki van Aartsen, Gittenberger E. & Goud, 1998
- Chrysallida josae van Aartsen, Gittenberger & Goud, 2000: synonym of Parthenina josae (van Aartsen, Gittenberger & Goud, 2000)
- Chrysallida juliae (de Folin, 1872): synonym of Parthenina juliae (de Folin, 1872)
- Chrysallida jullieni (Dautzenberg, 1912): synonym of Pyrgulina jullieni Dautzenberg, 1912
- Chrysallida kempermani van Aartsen, Gittenberger E. & Goud, 2000: synonym of Pyrgulina kempermani (van Aartsen, Gittenberger & Goud, 2000)
- Chrysallida kronenbergi van Aartsen, Gittenberger & Goud, 2000: synonym of Trabecula kronenbergi (van Aartsen, Gittenberger & Goud, 2000)
- Chrysallida lacourti F. Nordsieck, 1972: synonym of Spiralinella spiralis (Dillwyn, 1817)
- Chrysallida limitum (Brusina in de Folin & Périer, 1876): synonym of Parthenina limitum (Brusina in de Folin & Périer, 1876)
- Chrysallida maiae (Hornung & Mermod, 1924): synonym of Pyrgulina maiae Hornung & Mermod, 1924
- Chrysallida manonegra Peñas & Rolán, 1998: synonym of Chrysallida minutissima (Dautzenberg & H. Fischer, 1906)
- Chrysallida mariella (A. Adams, 1860): synonym of Egilina mariella (A. Adams, 1860)
- Chrysallida mariellaeformis: synonym of Babella mariellaeformis (Nomura, 1938)
- Chrysallida marthinae Nofroni & Schander, 1994: synonym of Spiralinella marthinae (Nofroni & Schander, 1994)
- Chrysallida mauritanica Peñas & Rolán, 1998: synonym of Parthenina mauritanica (Peñas & Rolán, 1998)
- Chrysallida micronana Ozturk & van Aartsen, 2006: synonym of Pyrgulina nana Hornung & Mermod, 1924
- Chrysallida monozona (Brusina, 1869): synonym of Parthenina monozona (Brusina, 1869)
- Chrysallida monterosatii (Clessin, 1900): synonym of Parthenina monterosatii (Clessin, 1900)
- Chrysallida moolenbeeki Amati, 1987: synonym of Parthenina moolenbeeki (Amati, 1987)
- Chrysallida muinaiensis (Saurin, 1962): synonym of Spiralinella muinaiensis Saurin, 1962
- Chrysallida multicostata (Jeffreys, 1884): synonym of Parthenina multicostata (Jeffreys, 1884)
- Chrysallida mumia A. Adams, 1861: synonym of Turbonilla mumia (A. Adams, 1861)
- Chrysallida mutata (Dautzenberg, 1912): synonym of Kongsrudia mutata (Dautzenberg, 1912)
- Chrysallida nanodea (Monterosato, 1878): synonym of Parthenina juliae (de Folin, 1872)
- Chrysallida nivosa (Montagu, 1803): synonym of Jordaniella nivosa (Montagu, 1803)
- Chrysallida obesa (Dautzenberg, 1912): synonym of Pyrgulina obesa Dautzenberg, 1912
- Chrysallida obtusa (Brown, 1827): synonym of Chrysallida interstincta (Adams J., 1797), synonym of Parthenina interstincta (J. Adams, 1797)
- Chrysallida oodes (Watson, 1886): synonym of Pyrgulina oodes (Watson, 1886)
- Chrysallida opaca Hedley, 1906: synonym of Odostomella opaca (Hedley, 1906)
- Chrysallida palazzii Micali, 1984: synonym of Parthenina palazzii (Micali, 1984)
- Chrysallida parasigmoidea Schander, 1994: synonym of Parthenina parasigmoidea (Schander, 1994)
- Chrysallida pellucida (Dillwyn, 1817): synonym of Spiralinella spiralis (Montagu, 1803)
- Chrysallida penchynati: synonym of Parthenina penchynati (Bucquoy, 1883)
- Chrysallida perscalata (Hedley, 1909): synonym of Linopyrga perscalata (Hedley, 1909)
- Chrysallida pinguis Peñas & Rolán, 1998: synonym of Pyrgulina pinguis (Peñas & Rolán, 1998)
- Chrysallida pirinthella (Melvill, 1910): synonym of Pyrgulina pirinthella Melvill, 1910
- Chrysallida plicata A. Adams, 1860: synonym of Pyrgulina plicata (A. Adams, 1860)
- Chrysallida pontica Grossu, 1986: synonym of Parthenina pontica (Grossu, 1986)
- Chrysallida pseudalveata Nomura, 1936: synonym of Pyrgulina pseudalveata (Nomura, 1936)
- Chrysallida pulchella A. Adams, 1860: synonym of Pyrgulina pulchella (A. Adams, 1860)
- Chrysallida pulchra Gaglini, 1992: synonym of Miralda elegans (de Folin, 1870): synonym of Liamorpha elegans (de Folin, 1870)
- Chrysallida punctigera (A. Adams, 1860): synonym of Linopyrga punctigera (A. Adams, 1860)
- Chrysallida pupula (A. Adams, 1861): synonym of Pyrgulina pupula (A. Adams, 1861)
- Chrysallida pyttelilla Schander, 1994: synonym of Parthenina pyttelilla (Schander, 1994)
- Chrysallida rinaldii Micali & Nofroni, 2004: synonym of Parthenina rinaldii (Micali & Nofroni, 2004)
- Chrysallida rufolineata A. Adams, 1863: synonym of Odostomella rufolineata (A. Adams, 1863)
- Chrysallida sarsi: synonym of Parthenina sarsi (Nordsieck, 1972)
- Chrysallida sergei Nofroni & Schander, 1994: synonym of Parthenina sergei (Nofroni & Schander, 1994)
- Chrysallida sigma: synonym of Kunopia sigma (Hedley, 1907)
- Chrysallida sigmoidea (Monterosato, 1880): synonym of Strioturbonilla sigmoidea (Monterosato, 1880)
- Chrysallida spiralis (Montagu, 1803): synonym of Spiralinella spiralis (Dillwyn, 1817)
- Chrysallida suturalis (Philippi, 1844): synonym of Parthenina suturalis (Philippi, 1844)
- Chrysallida tantilla (A. Adams, 1863): synonym of Linopyrga tantilla (A. Adams, 1863)
- Chrysallida terebellum (Philippi, 1844): synonym of Parthenina terebellum (Philippi, 1844)
- Chrysallida terryi (Olsson & McGinty, 1958): synonym of Ivara terryi (Olsson & McGinty, 1958)
- Chrysallida toroensis (Olsson & McGinty, 1958): synonym of Mumiola gradatula (Mörch, 1876)
- Chrysallida tricincta (Jeffreys, 1856): synonym of Odostomella doliolum (Philippi, 1844)
- Chrysallida truncatula (Jeffreys, 1850): synonym of Jordaniella truncatula (Jeffreys, 1850)
- Chrysallida ultralaeta Nomura, 1936: synonym of Parthenina ultralaeta (Nomura, 1936)
- Chrysallida undata (Watson, 1897): synonym of Trabecula jeffreysiana Monterosato, 1884
- Chrysallida vanderlindeni van Aartsen, Gittenberger & Goud, 2000: synonym of Pyrgulina vanderlindeni (van Aartsen, Gittenberger & Goud, 2000)
- Chrysallida willeminae van Aartsen, Gittenberger E. & Goud, 2000: synonym of Parthenina willeminae (van Aartsen, Gittenberger & Goud, 2000)

== Ecology ==
Little is known about the ecology of the members of this genus. As is true of most members of the Pyramidellidae sensu lato, they are most likely ectoparasites.
