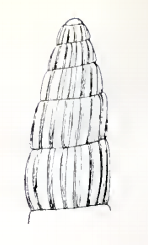
- Fragment of a shell of Turbonilla gibbosa

Scientific classification
- Kingdom: Animalia
- Phylum: Mollusca
- Class: Gastropoda
- Family: Pyramidellidae
- Genus: Turbonilla
- Species: T. gibbosa

Binomial name
- Turbonilla gibbosa (Carpenter, 1857)

Synonyms
- Chemnitzia gibbosa Carpenter, 1856 (basionym); Turbonilla (Pyrgolampros) gibbosa (Carpenter, 1857)

= Turbonilla gibbosa =

Species of gastropod

Turbonilla gibbosa is a species of sea snail, a marine gastropod mollusk in the family Pyramidellidae, the pyrams and their allies.

== Description ==
The reddish brown shell has an irregular pupiform shape. The length of its shell measures 6.75 mm. (The whorls of the protoconch are decollated.) The ten whorls of the teleoconch are flattened,. They are marked with about eighteen poorly developed, more or less rounded, vertical axial ribs and smooth intercostal spaces. This species is described, although from a solitary and very imperfect specimen, in consequence of its great peculiarity of form, in which it resembles Chrysallida. It is short, stumpy, and very broad; without any trace of fold on the columella or notch on the base.

== Distribution ==
The type specimen was found in the Pacific Ocean off Mazatlán, Baja California.
