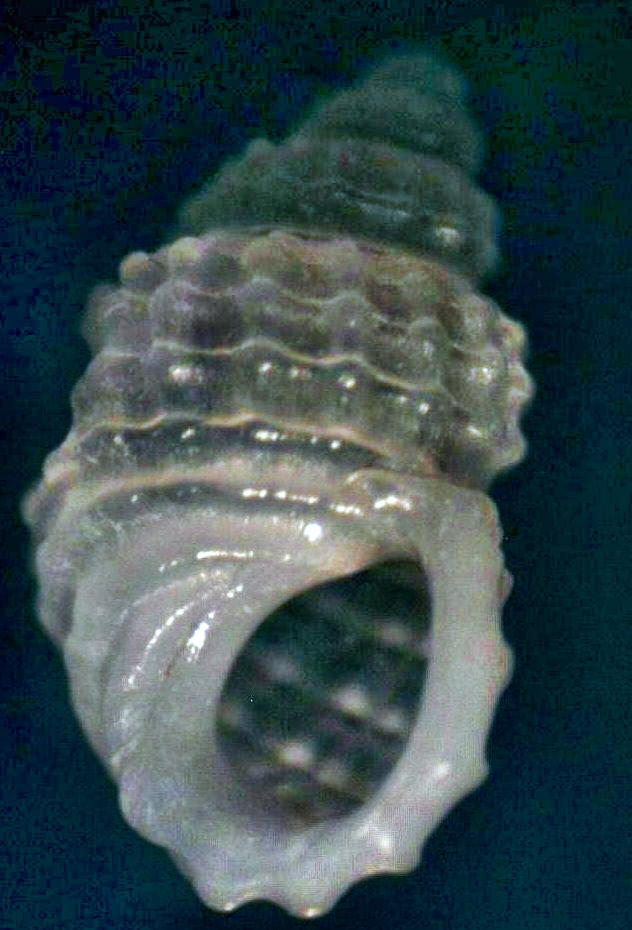
- Apertural view of a shell of Alvania subcrenulata

Scientific classification
- Kingdom: Animalia
- Phylum: Mollusca
- Class: Gastropoda
- Subclass: Caenogastropoda
- Order: Littorinimorpha
- Family: Rissoidae
- Genus: Alvania
- Species: A. subcrenulata

Binomial name
- Alvania subcrenulata (Bucquoy, Dautzenberg & Dollfus, 1884)

Synonyms
- Acinopsis subcrenulata (Bucquoy, Dautzenberg & Dollfus, 1884); Alvania (Alvania) subcrenulata (Bucquoy, Dautzenberg & Dollfus, 1884); Rissoa crenulata var. minor R. A. Philippi, 1844; Rissoa subcrenulata Bucquoy, Dautzenberg & Dollfus 1884 (basionym)

= Alvania subcrenulata =

Species of gastropod

Alvania subcrenulata is a species of small sea snail, a marine gastropod mollusk or micromollusk in the family Rissoidae.

== Description ==
The length of shell varies between 2.5 mm and 4 mm.

== Distribution ==
This species occurs in the Mediterranean Sea off Capri, Sicily, Corsica, and Greece.
