= Great Stupa =

Great Stupa may refer to:

- Great Stupa of Dharmakaya, a Buddhist monument in Colorado, United States
- Great Stupa of Universal Compassion, a Buddhist monument in Victoria, Australia
- Great Stupa at Sanchi, a Buddhist complex in India

== See also ==
- Stupa
- Stupa (disambiguation)
