= Stupa (disambiguation) =

Stupa is a mound-like structure containing Buddhist relics, used as a place of meditation.

Stupa may also refer to:

- Ice stupa, an artificial glacier mound for storing water
- Jain stupa, a structure erected by the Jains for devotional purposes
- Stupa, Croatia, a village in Dubrovačko Primorje

== Science ==
- A Latin word used in scientific names of animals:
  - Conus stupa, a species of sea snail
  - Gemmula stupa, a species of sea snail
  - Chrysallida stupa, a species of sea snail

== See also ==
- Dagoba (disambiguation)
