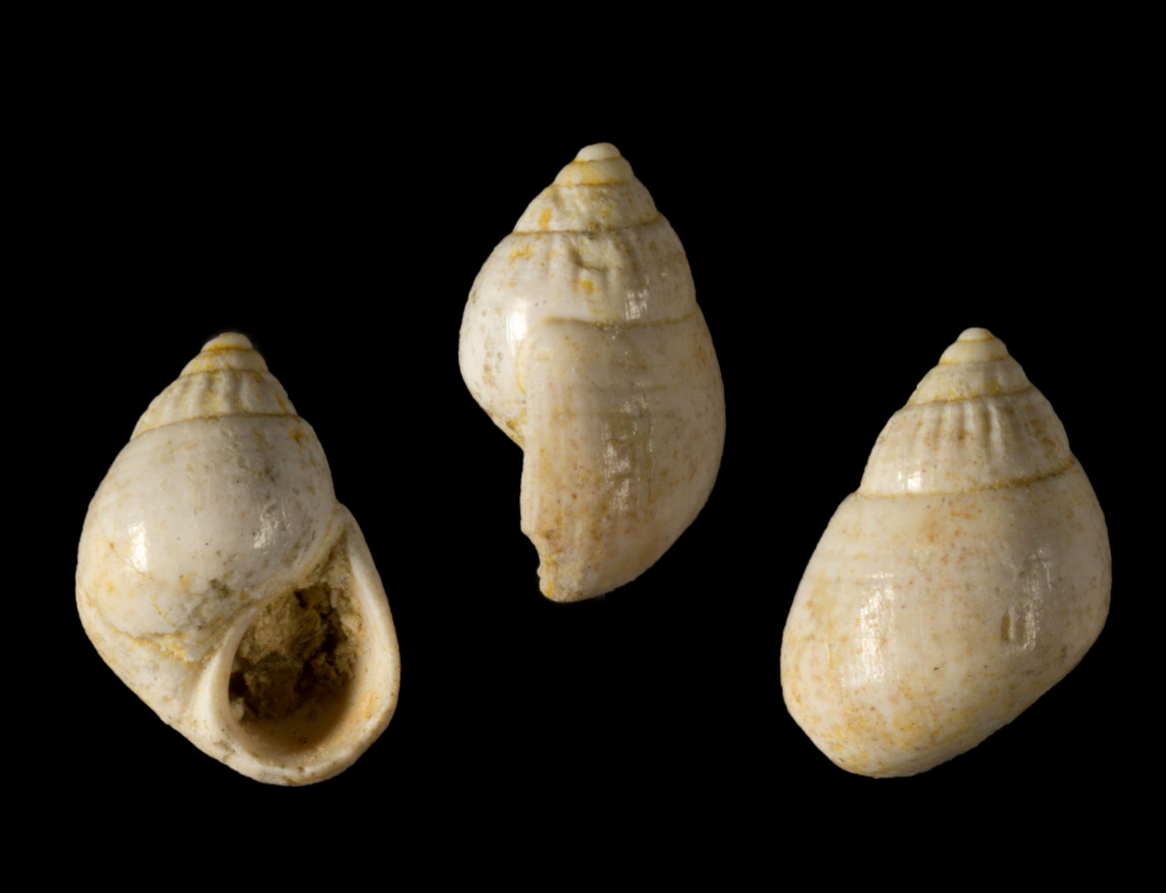
- Shell of Alvania ziziphina (specimen at MNHN, Paris)

Scientific classification
- Kingdom: Animalia
- Phylum: Mollusca
- Class: Gastropoda
- Subclass: Caenogastropoda
- Order: Littorinimorpha
- Superfamily: Rissooidea
- Family: Rissoidae
- Genus: Alvania
- Species: †A. ziziphina

Binomial name
- †Alvania ziziphina Dollfus, 1949

= Alvania ziziphina =

Species of gastropod

Alvania ziziphina is an extinct species of minute sea snail, a marine gastropod mollusk or micromollusk in the family Rissoidae.

== Distribution ==
Fossils have been found in Pliocene strata in Brittany, France.
