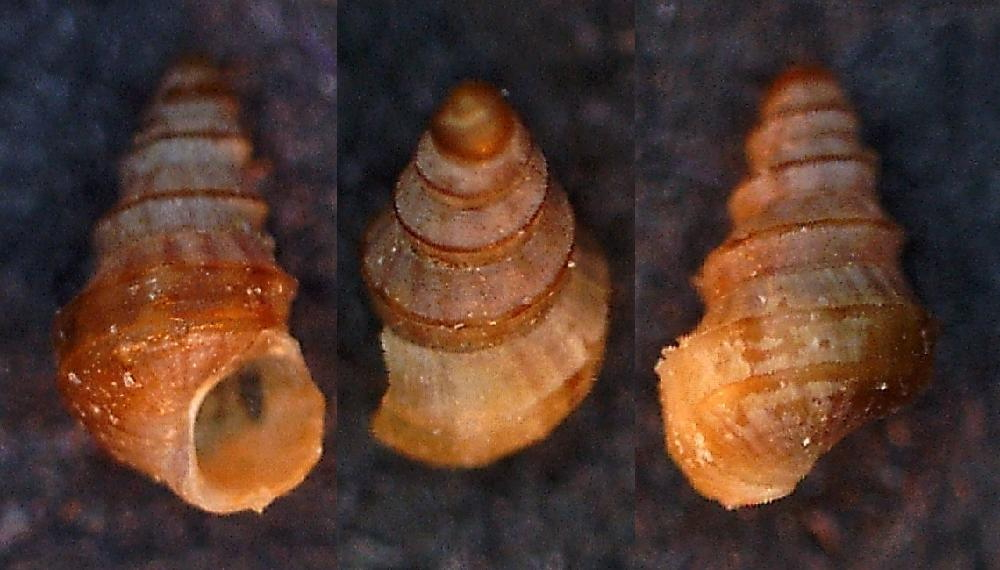
- Shell of Alvania pagodula

Scientific classification
- Kingdom: Animalia
- Phylum: Mollusca
- Class: Gastropoda
- Subclass: Caenogastropoda
- Order: Littorinimorpha
- Superfamily: Rissooidea
- Family: Rissoidae
- Genus: Alvania
- Species: A. pagodula

Binomial name
- Alvania pagodula (Bucquoy, Dautzenberg & Dollfus, 1884)

Synonyms
- Rissoa pagodula Bucquoy, Dautzenberg & Dollfus, 1884 · unaccepted; Rissoa philippiana Jeffreys, 1856 (junior homonym of Rissoa philippiana Nyst, 1845)

= Alvania pagodula =

Species of gastropod

Alvania pagodula is a species of small sea snail, a marine gastropod mollusk or micromollusk in the family Rissoidae.

== Description ==
The length of the shell varies between 1.7 mm and 4 mm.

- Elevated, turreted spire composed of six convex whorls
- Smooth embryonic whorls followed by whorls with characteristic sculpture
- Composed of raised longitudinal ribs (nodulous intersection points)
- Last whorl: longitudinal ribs stop abruptly at the rounded base of the aperture
- Lower part of this whorl has three strong decurrent cords
- Rounded aperture
- Light brown uniform coloration
- Horny, thin, pauci-spiral operculum

== Distribution ==
This species occurs in the Western Mediterranean Sea.
