= Chrysallida mayii =

May's pyramid-shell

Scientific classification
- Kingdom: Animalia
- Phylum: Mollusca
- Class: Gastropoda
- Family: Pyramidellidae
- Genus: Chrysallida
- Species: C. mayii

Binomial name
- Chrysallida mayii (Tate, 1898)

Synonyms
- Odostomia mayii (Tate, 1898); Odostomia (Egila) mayii (Tate, 1898); Odontostomia (Pyrgulina) mayii Tate, 1898 (basionym)

Species of gastropod

Chrysallida mayii, common name the May's pyramid-shell, is a species of sea snail, a marine gastropod mollusk in the family Pyramidellidae, the pyrams and their allies.

== Description ==
The length of the shell measures 2.5 mm.

== Distribution ==
This endemic species occurs in the littoral zone and offshore off Tasmania, and South Australia, New South Wales and Western Australia.
