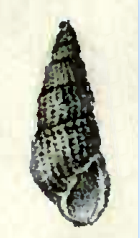
- Mumiola spirata

Scientific classification
- Kingdom: Animalia
- Phylum: Mollusca
- Class: Gastropoda
- Subcohort: Panpulmonata
- Superfamily: Pyramidelloidea
- Family: Pyramidellidae
- Genus: Mumiola; A. Adams, 1864

Type species
- Monoptygma spirata A. Adams, 1853

Synonyms
- Chrysallida (Mumiola) A. Adams, 1864

= Mumiola =

Genus of gastropods

Mumiola is a genus of sea snails, marine gastropod mollusks in the family Pyramidellidae, the pyrams and their allies.

== Species ==
Species within the genus Mumiola include:

- Mumiola carbasea Melvill, 1904
- Mumiola crispata Peñas & Rolán, 2017
- Mumiola epibathra Melvill, 1906
- Mumiola gradatula (Mörch, 1876)
- Mumiola julioferreri Peñas & Rolán, 2017
- Mumiola marquesensis Peñas & Rolán, 2017
- Mumiola myrnae Poppe, Tagaro & Stahlschmidt, 2015
- Mumiola reticosa A. Adams, 1863
- Mumiola spirata (A. Adams, 1860)
- Mumiola tesselata A. Adams, 1863

Species brought into synonymy

- Mumiola epentroma (Melvill, 1896): synonym of Costabieta epentroma (Melvill, 1896)
- Mumiola megacheilos (de Folin, 1878): synonym of Mumiola tessellata A. Adams, 1863
- Mumiola superba Saurin, 1959: synonym of Mumiola tessellata A. Adams, 1863
