= Chrysallida cancellata =

Scientific classification
- Kingdom: Animalia
- Phylum: Mollusca
- Class: Gastropoda
- Family: Pyramidellidae
- Genus: Chrysallida
- Species: C. cancellata

Binomial name
- Chrysallida cancellata (d'Orbigny, 1841)

Species of gastropod

Chrysallida cancellata is a species of sea snail, a marine gastropod mollusk in the family Pyramidellidae, the pyrams and their allies. The species is one of many species within the Chrysallida genus of gastropods.

== Distribution ==
This marine species mainly occurs throughout American waters, these include the following locations:

- Caribbean Sea
- Cuba
- Gulf of Mexico
- Lesser Antilles
- North West Atlantic Ocean

The species ranges from approximately 36.5°N to 12°N; 93.5°W to 65°W, these coordinates cover the United States, Virginia, North Carolina, Louisiana; Cuba; Virgin Islands and St. Thomas.
