= Chrysallida connexa =

Scientific classification
- Kingdom: Animalia
- Phylum: Mollusca
- Class: Gastropoda
- Family: Pyramidellidae
- Genus: Chrysallida
- Species: C. connexa

Binomial name
- Chrysallida connexa (Dautzenberg, 1912)

Synonyms
- Pyrgulina connexa Dautzenberg, 1912

Species of gastropod

Chrysallida connexa is a species of sea snail, a marine gastropod mollusk in the family Pyramidellidae, the pyrams and their allies. The species is one of a number within the genus Chrysallida.
