= Fargoa =

Scientific classification
- Kingdom: Animalia
- Phylum: Mollusca
- Class: Gastropoda
- Family: Pyramidellidae
- Genus: Fargoa; Bartsch, 1955

Species
- See text

Genus of gastropods

Fargoa is a genus of very small sea snails, marine gastropod mollusks in the tribe Chrysallidini within the family Pyramidellidae.

== Life habits ==
The members of Fargoa are ectoparasites on the serpulid polychaete Hydroides.

== Species ==
Species within the genus Fargoa include:

- Fargoa calesi (Bartsch, 1955) = Fargoa bushiana (Bartsch, 1909) - as Odostomia bushiana, type species
- Fargoa bartschi (Winkley, 1909)
- Fargoa buijsei (de Jong & Coomans, 1988)
- Fargoa dianthophila (H. W. Wells & M. J. Wells, 1961)
- Fargoa dux (Dall & Bartsch, 1906)
- Fargoa gaudens Odé, 1993
- Fargoa gibbosa (Bush, 1909)
