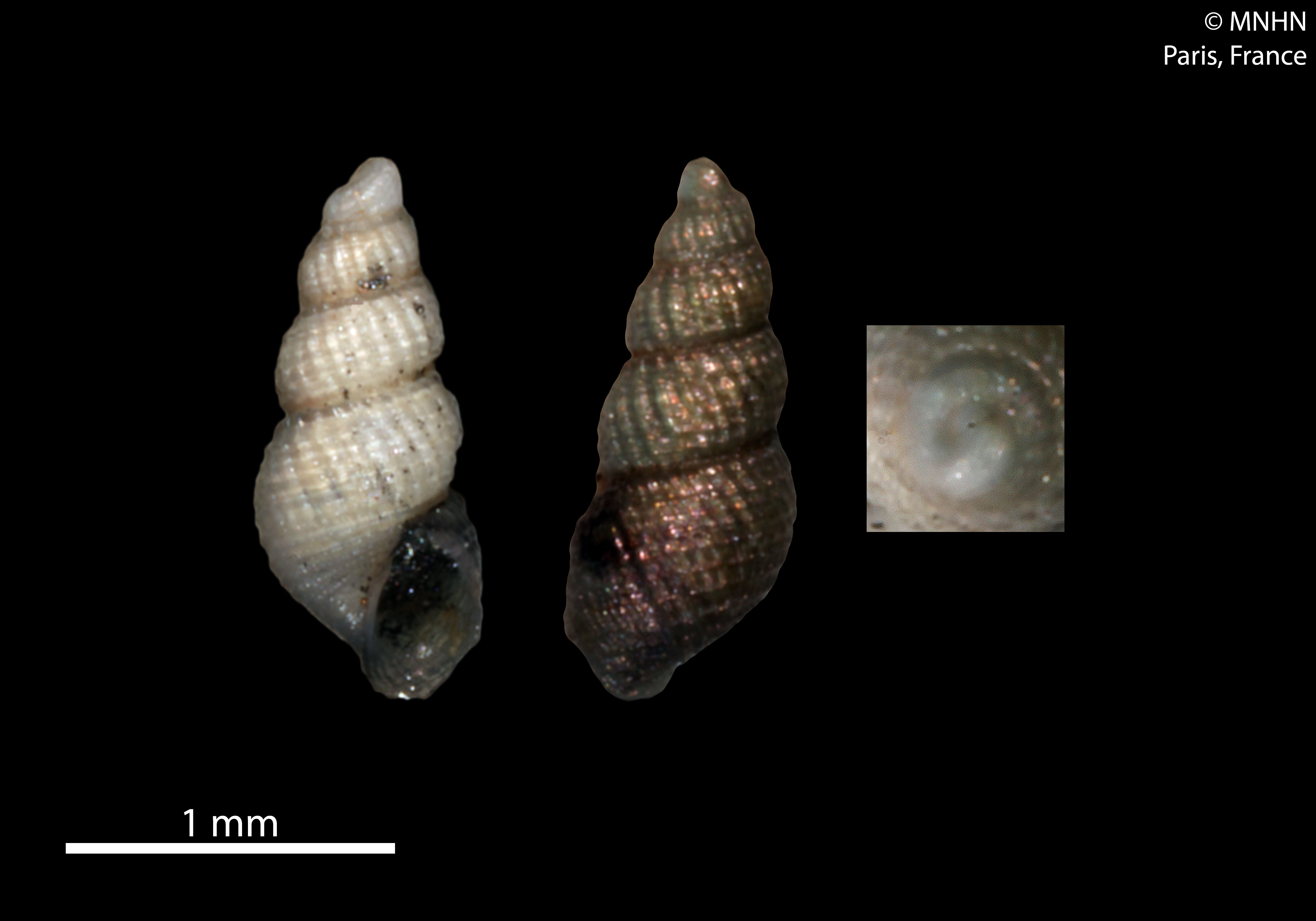
- Shell of Chrysallida leoni (paratype at MNHN, Paris)

Scientific classification
- Kingdom: Animalia
- Phylum: Mollusca
- Class: Gastropoda
- Family: Pyramidellidae
- Genus: Chrysallida
- Species: C. leoni

Binomial name
- Chrysallida leoni Fernández-Garcés, Peñas & Rolán, 2011

= Chrysallida leoni =

Species of gastropod

Chrysallida leoni is a species of sea snail, a marine gastropod mollusk in the family Pyramidellidae, the pyrams and their allies. The species is one of a number within the genus Chrysallida.

== Distribution ==
This marine species occurs in the Caribbean Sea off Cuba.
