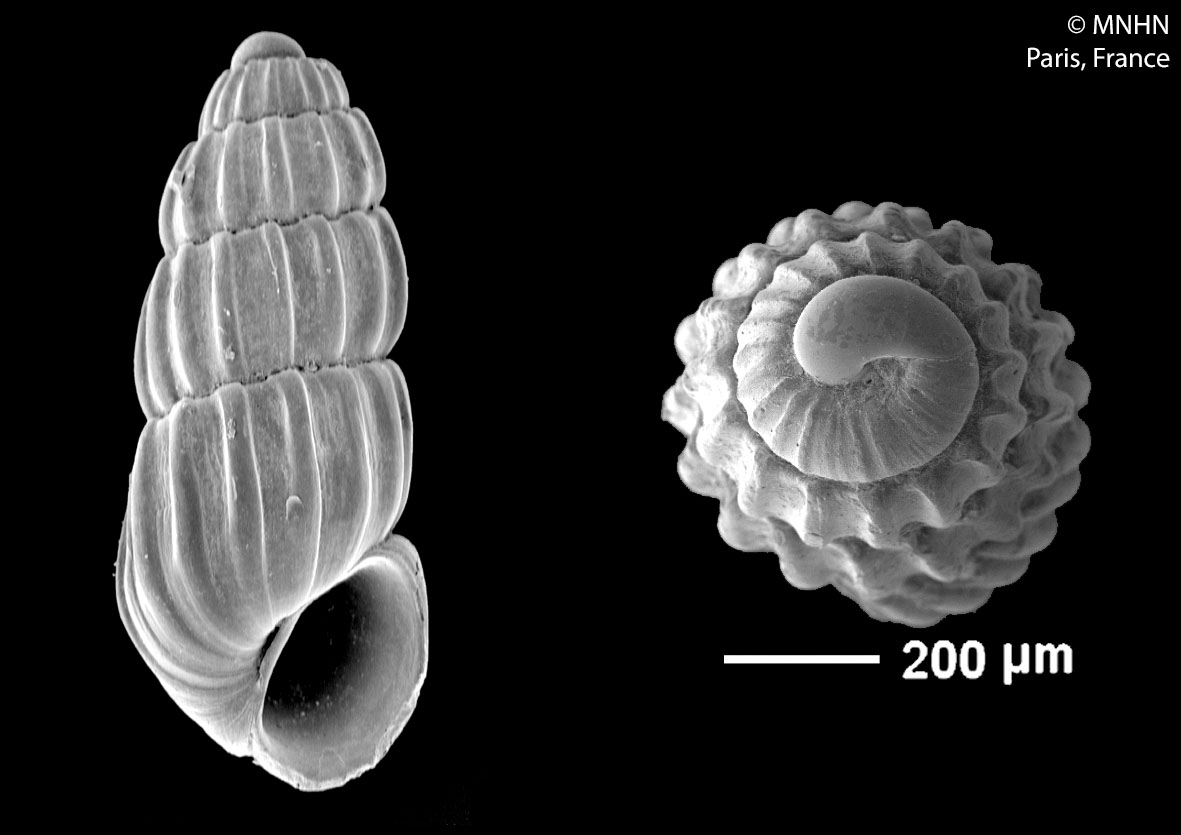
- shell of Trabecula aequilibritas (holotype at MNHN, Paris)

Scientific classification
- Kingdom: Animalia
- Phylum: Mollusca
- Class: Gastropoda
- Subcohort: Panpulmonata
- Superfamily: Pyramidelloidea
- Family: Pyramidellidae
- Genus: Trabecula; Monterosato, 1884

Type species
- Trabecula jeffreysiana Monterosato, 1884

Synonyms
- Chrysallida (Trabecula) Monterosato, 1884; Odostomia (Salassiella) Dall & Bartsch, 1909 (a junior synonym); Salassiella Dall & Bartsch, 1909

= Trabecula (gastropod) =

Genus of gastropods

Trabecula is a genus of very small sea snails, marine gastropod molluscs or micromolluscs in the family Pyramidellidae, the pyrams and their allies, and the subfamily Chrysallidinae, a large taxon of minute marine gastropods with an intorted protoconch.

== Taxonomy ==
Dall & Bartsch (1904: 10) misinterpreted this genus and described it with “intercostal spaces crossed by equally spaced, raised spiral threads, sculpture reticulated”, despite that Monterosato (1884) wrote that there is no apparent spiral sculpture. This may explain why Dall & Bartsch (1909) described a new genus Salassiella with a type species extremely similar to that of Trabecula

== General description ==
The whorls of the teleoconch are rounded, and longitudinally lamellose. The aperture is semicircular, with an exterior rib. There is no apparent spiral sculpture. The apex is retrorse. The columella lacks a fold or tooth.

== Species ==
- Trabecula abei (Nomura, 1938)
- Trabecula aequilibritas Peñas & Rolán, 2017
- † Trabecula awaeusis (Nomura, 1938)
- †Trabecula hossakuensis (Nomura, 1938)
- Trabecula jeffreysiana Monterosato, 1884
- Trabecula kronenbergi (van Aartsen, Gittenberger & Goud, 2000)
- Trabecula krumpermani (Jong & Coomans, 1988)
- Trabecula laxa (Dall & Bartsch, 1909) (synonym : Odostomia (Salasiella) laxa Dall & Bartsch, 1909)
- † Trabecula numaensis (Nomura, 1938)
- † Trabecula perpupoidea (Nomura, 1938)
- Trabecula tani (Saurin, 1959)
- Trabecula tantilloides (Nomura, 1938)
- Trabecula truncatelliformis (Hori & Fukuda, 1999)
- Trabecula yositunei (Nomura, 1938)

Species brought into synonymy

- Trabecula montforti (Corgan, 1972): synonym of Nesiodostomia montforti Corgan, 1972
- Trabecula plicata (A. Adams, 1860): synonym of Pyrgulina plicata (A. Adams, 1860)
- Trabecula punctigera (A. Adams, 1860): synonym of Linopyrga punctigera (A. Adams, 1860)
- Trabecula tantilla (A. Adams, 1863): synonym of Linopyrga tantilla (A. Adams, 1863)
