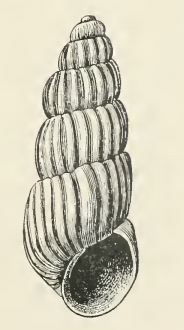

Scientific classification
- Kingdom: Animalia
- Phylum: Mollusca
- Class: Gastropoda
- Family: Pyramidellidae
- Genus: Trabecula
- Species: T. laxa

Binomial name
- Trabecula laxa (Dall & Bartsch, 1909)

Synonyms
- Chrysallida (Trabecula) jeffreysiana (Monterosato, T.A. de M. di, 1884); Odostomia (Salasiella) laxa Dall & Bartsch, 1909; Salassia balchi Bartsch, 1955

= Trabecula laxa =

Species of gastropod

Trabecula laxa is a species of sea snail, a marine gastropod mollusk in the family Pyramidellidae, the pyrams and their allies.

== Description ==
The milk-white, smooth shell has a pupiform shape. The length of the shell varies between 3 mm and 4.3 mm. There are at least two small whorls in the protoconch. They form a depressed helicoid spire, whose axis is at right angles to that of the succeeding turns, in the first of which it is about two-thirds immersed. The six whorls of the teleoconch are inflated and sculptured similarly throughout. They are contracted at the sutures, and strongly roundedly shouldered at the summit. A spiral sculpture is wanting. They are marked by sublamellar, flexuose axial ribs, which are only feebly expressed on the first. On the second there are 18, on the third 20, 22 upon the fourth, and 28 upon the penultimate turn, upon which there is a strong varix. The intercostal spaces are about one and one-half times as wide as the ribs, and well impressed. The sutures are constricted. The periphery and the base of the body whorl well rounded. They are marked by the continuations of the axial ribs. The aperture is broadly oval. The posterior angle is obtuse. The outer lip is thin, showing the external sculpture within. The columella is slender, strongly curved, and slightly revolute. It is provided with a weak fold at its insertion.

== Distribution ==
This marine species occurs in the following locations:

- Gulf of Mexico at depths between 17 mm and 73 m.
