= Kongsrudia =

Scientific classification
- Kingdom: Animalia
- Phylum: Mollusca
- Class: Gastropoda
- Family: Pyramidellidae
- Tribe: Chrysallidini
- Genus: Kongsrudia; Lygre & Schander, 2010

Type species
- Actaeopyramis gruveli Dautzenberg, 1910

Genus of gastropods

Kongsrudia is a genus of sea snails, marine gastropod mollusks in the family Pyramidellidae, the pyrams and their allies.

== Species ==
Species within the genus Kongsrudia include:

- Kongsrudia approximans (Dautzenberg, 1912)
- Kongsrudia ersei (Schander, 1994)
- Kongsrudia gruveli (Dautzenberg, 1910)
- Kongsrudia mutata (Dautzenberg, 1912)
- Kongsrudia rolani Lygre & Schander, 2010
