= Chrysallida canariensis =

Scientific classification
- Kingdom: Animalia
- Phylum: Mollusca
- Class: Gastropoda
- Family: Pyramidellidae
- Genus: Chrysallida
- Species: C. canariensis

Binomial name
- Chrysallida canariensis Nordsieck & Talavera, 1979

Species of gastropod

Chrysallida canariensis is a species of sea snail, a marine gastropod mollusk in the family Pyramidellidae, the pyrams and their allies. The species is one of multiple species within the Chrysallida genus of gastropods.

== Distribution ==
This marine species occurs in European waters.
