= Chrysallida nana =

Scientific classification
- Kingdom: Animalia
- Phylum: Mollusca
- Class: Gastropoda
- Family: Pyramidellidae
- Genus: Chrysallida
- Species: C. nana

Binomial name
- Chrysallida nana (A. Adams, 1861)

Species of gastropod

Chrysallida nana is a species of sea snail, a marine gastropod mollusk in the family Pyramidellidae, the pyrams and their allies. The species is one of a number within the genus Chrysallida.

== Distribution ==
This species occurs in the following locations:

- Indian Ocean
- Pacific Ocean
