= Fargoa dianthophila =

Serpulid odostome

Scientific classification
- Kingdom: Animalia
- Phylum: Mollusca
- Class: Gastropoda
- Family: Pyramidellidae
- Genus: Fargoa
- Species: F. dianthophila

Binomial name
- Fargoa dianthophila (Wells & Wells, 1961)

Synonyms
- Odostomia (Fargoa) dianthophila (Wells & Wells, 1961)

Species of gastropod

Fargoa dianthophila, common name the serpulid odostome, is a species of sea snail, a marine gastropod mollusk in the family Pyramidellidae, the pyrams and their allies.

== Description ==
The shell grows to a length of 1.8 mm.

== Distribution ==
This species occurs in the following locations:

- Gulf of Mexico (Texas)
- North West Atlantic (Massachusetts)

== Notes ==
Additional information regarding this species:

- Distribution: Range: 41.5°N to 25°N; 96°W to 70.7°W. Distribution: USA: Massachusetts, North Carolina, Florida; Florida: East Florida, West Florida; USA: Texas
