= Chrysallida medialuna =

Scientific classification
- Kingdom: Animalia
- Phylum: Mollusca
- Class: Gastropoda
- Family: Pyramidellidae
- Genus: Chrysallida
- Species: C. medialuna

Binomial name
- Chrysallida medialuna Faber, 2008

Species of gastropod

Chrysallida medialuna is a species of sea snail, a marine gastropod mollusk in the family Pyramidellidae, the pyrams and their allies. The species is one of a number within the genus Chrysallida.
