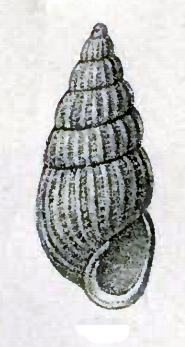
- Apertural view of a shell of Chrysallida decorata

Scientific classification
- Kingdom: Animalia
- Phylum: Mollusca
- Class: Gastropoda
- Family: Pyramidellidae
- Genus: Chrysallida
- Species: C. decorata

Binomial name
- Chrysallida decorata (Philippi, 1849)

Synonyms
- Odontostomia decorata Philippi, 1849 (basionym)

= Chrysallida decorata =

Species of gastropod

Chrysallida decorata is a species of sea snail, a marine gastropod mollusk in the family Pyramidellidae, the pyrams and their allies. The species is one of a number within the genus Chrysallida.

== Description ==
The shell is longitudinally plicated. The wider interstices are spirally striated. The plicae continue to the base. The six whorls of the teleoconch are slightly convex, with a well-impressed suture and a small plait. The length of the shell measures 3 mm.

== Distribution ==
The vast majority of this species is mainly distributed within the Red Sea.
