= Chrysallida hoenselaari =

Scientific classification
- Kingdom: Animalia
- Phylum: Mollusca
- Class: Gastropoda
- Family: Pyramidellidae
- Genus: Chrysallida
- Species: C. hoenselaari

Binomial name
- Chrysallida hoenselaari van Aartsen, Gittenberger & Goud, 2000

Species of gastropod

Chrysallida hoenselaari is a species of sea snail, a marine gastropod mollusk in the family Pyramidellidae, the pyrams and their allies. The species is one of a number within the genus Chrysallida.

== Distribution ==
This species occurs in the following locations:

- Cape Verde
