= Chrysallida angusta =

Scientific classification
- Kingdom: Animalia
- Phylum: Mollusca
- Class: Gastropoda
- Family: Pyramidellidae
- Genus: Chrysallida
- Species: C. angusta

Binomial name
- Chrysallida angusta Carpenter, 1864

Synonyms
- Turbonilla angusta (P. P. Carpenter, 1864)

Species of gastropod

Chrysallida angusta is a species of sea snail, a marine gastropod mollusk in the family Pyramidellidae, the pyrams and their allies.
