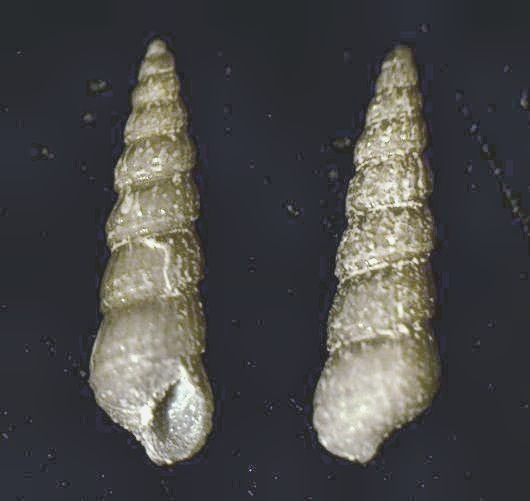

Scientific classification
- Kingdom: Animalia
- Phylum: Mollusca
- Class: Gastropoda
- Family: Pyramidellidae
- Genus: Chrysallida
- Species: C. fenestrata

Binomial name
- Chrysallida fenestrata (A. Adams, 1860)

Synonyms
- Parthenia fenestrata A. Adams, 1860

= Chrysallida fenestrata =

Species of gastropod

Chrysallida fenestrata is a species of sea snail, a marine gastropod mollusk in the family Pyramidellidae, the pyrams and their allies. The species is one of a number within the genus Chrysallida.
