= Chrysallida verdensis =

Scientific classification
- Kingdom: Animalia
- Phylum: Mollusca
- Class: Gastropoda
- Family: Pyramidellidae
- Genus: Chrysallida
- Species: C. verdensis

Binomial name
- Chrysallida verdensis Peñas & Rolán, 1998

Synonyms
- Chrysallida verdensis Penas & Rolan, 1998

Species of gastropod

Chrysallida verdensis is a species of sea snail, a marine gastropod mollusk in the family Pyramidellidae, the pyrams and their allies. The species is one of a number within the genus Chrysallida

== Distribution ==
This species occurs in the following locations:

- Cape Verde archipelago
