= Chrysallida vanbruggeni =

Scientific classification
- Kingdom: Animalia
- Phylum: Mollusca
- Class: Gastropoda
- Family: Pyramidellidae
- Genus: Chrysallida
- Species: C. vanbruggeni

Binomial name
- Chrysallida vanbruggeni van Aartsen & Corgan, 1996

Synonyms
- Odostomia ornata W.H. Turton, 1932

Species of gastropod

Chrysallida vanbruggeni is a species of sea snail, a marine gastropod mollusk in the family Pyramidellidae, the pyrams and their allies. The species is one of a number within the genus Chrysallida.
