= Kongsrudia rolani =

Scientific classification
- Kingdom: Animalia
- Phylum: Mollusca
- Class: Gastropoda
- Family: Pyramidellidae
- Genus: Kongsrudia
- Species: K. rolani

Binomial name
- Kongsrudia rolani Lygre & Schander, 2010

Species of gastropod

Kongsrudia rolani is a species of sea snail, a marine gastropod mollusk in the family Pyramidellidae, the pyrams and their allies.
