= Tragula =

Scientific classification
- Kingdom: Animalia
- Phylum: Mollusca
- Class: Gastropoda
- Subcohort: Panpulmonata
- Superfamily: Pyramidelloidea
- Family: Pyramidellidae
- Genus: Tragula; Monterosato, 1884

Type species
- Odostomia fenestrata Jeffreys, 1848

Synonyms
- Burkillia Iredale, 1915 (unnecessary replacement name for Tragula Monterosato, 1884); Pyrgulina (Tragula) Monterosato, 1884 superseded rank; Turbonilla (Tragula) Monterosato, 1884 superseded rank

Genus of gastropods

Tragula is a genus of very small sea snails, marine gastropod molluscs or micromolluscs in the family Pyramidellidae, the pyrams and their allies, and the subfamily Chrysallidinae, a large taxon of minute marine gastropods with an intorted protoconch.

== Species ==
- Tragula falcifera (Watson, 1881)
- Tragula fenestrata (Jeffreys, 1848)
- † Tragula saccoi Bongiardino & Micali, 2018

Species brought into synonymy

- Tragula trifuniculata Saurin, 1962: synonym of Chrysallida trifuniculata (Saurin, 1962)
- Tragula unilirata Saurin, 1959: synonym of Turbolidium uniliratum (Saurin, 1959)
