= Trabecula krumpermani =

Scientific classification
- Kingdom: Animalia
- Phylum: Mollusca
- Class: Gastropoda
- Family: Pyramidellidae
- Genus: Trabecula
- Species: T. krumpermani

Binomial name
- Trabecula krumpermani (Jong & Coomans, 1988)

Synonyms
- Turbonilla krumpermani Jong & Coomans, 1988

Species of gastropod

Trabecula krumpermani is a species of sea snail, a marine gastropod mollusk in the family Pyramidellidae, the pyrams and their allies.

== Description ==
The shell grows to a length of 8.6 mm.

== Distribution ==
This marine species occurs off Curacao; in the Atlantic Ocean off Brazil: Pernambuco, Bahia, Abrolhos Archipelago, Espirito Santo, Rio de Janeiro.
