= Dagoba =

Dagoba may refer to:

- Dagobah, a fictional planet in the Star Wars universe
- Dagoba (temple), another name for a Buddhist stupa, particularly the white form common in China under the Qing dynasty
- Dagoba (band), a French metal band
- Dagoba Chocolate, a brand of organic chocolate
- Dağoba, Bayramiç, a village in Turkey

== See also ==
- Stupa (disambiguation)
