= Chrysallida gubbiolii =

Scientific classification
- Kingdom: Animalia
- Phylum: Mollusca
- Class: Gastropoda
- Family: Pyramidellidae
- Genus: Chrysallida
- Species: C. gubbiolii

Binomial name
- Chrysallida gubbiolii Peñas & Rolán, 1998

Species of gastropod

Chrysallida gubbiolii is a species of sea snail, a marine gastropod mollusk in the family Pyramidellidae, the pyrams and their allies. The species is one of a number within the genus Chrysallida.
