= Chrysallida foveata =

Scientific classification
- Kingdom: Animalia
- Phylum: Mollusca
- Class: Gastropoda
- Family: Pyramidellidae
- Genus: Chrysallida
- Species: C. foveata

Binomial name
- Chrysallida foveata Robba, Di Geronimo, Chaimanee, Negri & Sanfilippo, 2004

Species of gastropod

Chrysallida foveata is a species of sea snail, a marine gastropod mollusk in the family Pyramidellidae, the pyrams and their allies. The species is one of a number within the genus Chrysallida.
