= Chrysallida trachis =

Scientific classification
- Kingdom: Animalia
- Phylum: Mollusca
- Class: Gastropoda
- Family: Pyramidellidae
- Genus: Chrysallida
- Species: C. trachis

Binomial name
- Chrysallida trachis (Dall & Bartsch, 1909)

Species of gastropod

Chrysallida trachis is a species of sea snail, a marine gastropod mollusc in the family Pyramidellidae, the pyrams and their allies. The species is one of a number within the genus Chrysallida.
