= Chrysallida africana =

Scientific classification
- Kingdom: Animalia
- Phylum: Mollusca
- Class: Gastropoda
- Family: Pyramidellidae
- Genus: Chrysallida
- Species: C. africana

Binomial name
- Chrysallida africana van Aartsen & Corgan, 1996

Synonyms
- Odostomia formosa W.H. Turton, 1932

Species of gastropod

Chrysallida africana is a species of sea snail, a marine gastropod mollusk in the family Pyramidellidae, the pyrams and their allies. It is one of many species of the large Chrysallida genus of gastropods. The species was named 'Africana' in honor of the continent, Africa, as the species is mostly distributed throughout marine terrain off the coasts of South Africa and the Cape of Good Hope.
