= Fargoa bartschi =

Scientific classification
- Kingdom: Animalia
- Phylum: Mollusca
- Class: Gastropoda
- Family: Pyramidellidae
- Genus: Fargoa
- Species: F. bartschi

Binomial name
- Fargoa bartschi (Winkley, 1909)

Synonyms
- Odostomia modesta (Stimpson, 1851)

Species of gastropod

Fargoa bartschi is a species of sea snail, a marine gastropod mollusk in the family Pyramidellidae, the pyrams and their allies.

== Distribution ==
This species occurs in the following locations:

- Cobscook Bay
- Gulf of Maine
- Gulf of Mexico
- North West Atlantic

== Notes ==
Additional information regarding this species:

- Distribution: Range: 45°N to 28°N; 97°W to 68°W. Distribution: Cobscook Bay to Massachusetts, New Jersey, North Carolina, South Carolina, Texas
