= Fargoa gibbosa =

Scientific classification
- Kingdom: Animalia
- Phylum: Mollusca
- Class: Gastropoda
- Family: Pyramidellidae
- Genus: Fargoa
- Species: F. gibbosa

Binomial name
- Fargoa gibbosa (Bush, 1909)

Synonyms
- Odostomia (Fargoa) gibbosa (Bush, 1909)

Species of gastropod

Fargoa gibbosa is a species of sea snail, a marine gastropod mollusk in the family Pyramidellidae, the pyrams and their allies.

== Description ==
The shell grows to a length of 0.5 cm and is in the shape of a cone-like whorl. They are found within depths of 0 to 57 meters, and live in tropical climates. They are also known to live in reefs.

== Distribution ==
This species occurs in the following locations:

- Gulf of Maine
- Gulf of Mexico
- North West Atlantic

== Notes ==
Additional information regarding this species:

- Distribution: Maine to North Carolina, Georgia, Florida; Florida: West Florida
