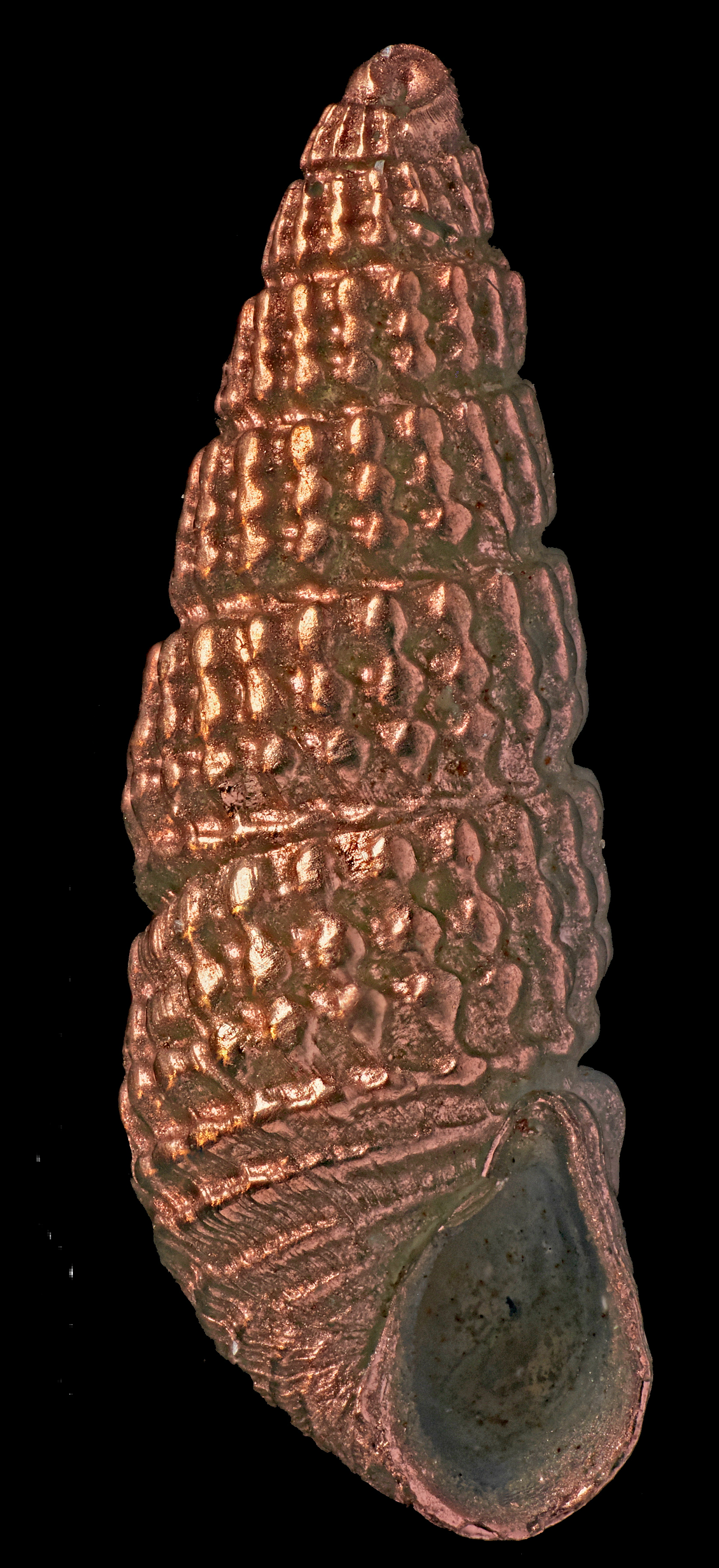
- Shell of Chrysallida minutissima (neotype at MNHN, Paris)

Scientific classification
- Kingdom: Animalia
- Phylum: Mollusca
- Class: Gastropoda
- Family: Pyramidellidae
- Genus: Chrysallida
- Species: C. minutissima

Binomial name
- Chrysallida minutissima (Dautzenberg & H. Fischer, 1906)

Synonyms
- Actaeopyramis minutissima Dautzenberg & H. Fischer, 1906 (original combination); Chrysallida manonegra Peñas & Rolán, 1998

= Chrysallida minutissima =

Species of gastropod

Chrysallida minutissima is a species of sea snail, a marine gastropod mollusk in the family Pyramidellidae, the pyrams and their allies. The species is one of a number within the genus Chrysallida.

== Distribution ==
This species occurs in the following locations:

- Cape Verde archipelago
