= Chrysallida maoria =

Scientific classification
- Kingdom: Animalia
- Phylum: Mollusca
- Class: Gastropoda
- Family: Pyramidellidae
- Genus: Chrysallida
- Species: C. maoria

Binomial name
- Chrysallida maoria (Powell, 1940)

Synonyms
- Ividella maoria Powell, 1940

Species of gastropod

Chrysallida maoria is a species of sea snail, a marine gastropod mollusk in the family Pyramidellidae, the pyrams and their allies. The species is one of a number within the genus Chrysallida.

== Distribution ==
This species occurs in the following locations:

- New Zealand Exclusive Economic Zone
