= Chrysallida subtantilla =

Scientific classification
- Kingdom: Animalia
- Phylum: Mollusca
- Class: Gastropoda
- Family: Pyramidellidae
- Genus: Chrysallida
- Species: C. subtantilla

Binomial name
- Chrysallida subtantilla Golikov in Golikov & Scarlato, 1967

Species of gastropod

Chrysallida subtantilla is a species of sea snail, a marine gastropod mollusk in the family Pyramidellidae, the pyrams and their allies. The species is one of a number within the genus Chrysallida.

== Distribution ==
This species occurs in the following locations:

- Russian waters
- Laptev Sea

== Habitat ==
This species is found in the following habitats:

- Brackish
- Marine
