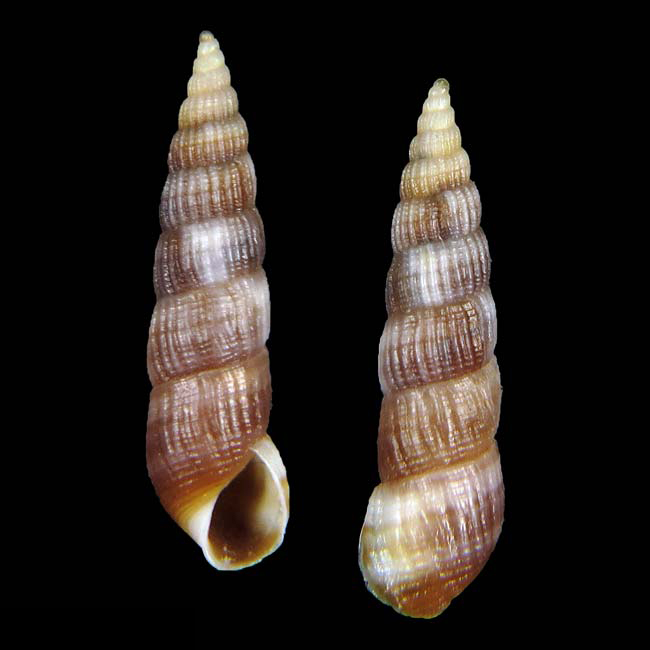

Scientific classification
- Kingdom: Animalia
- Phylum: Mollusca
- Class: Gastropoda
- Family: Pyramidellidae
- Genus: Mumiola
- Species: M. myrnae

Binomial name
- Mumiola myrnae Poppe, Tagaro & Stahlschmidt, 2015

= Mumiola myrnae =

Species of gastropod

Mumiola myrnae is a species of sea snail, a marine gastropod mollusk in the family Pyramidellidae.

== Original description ==
- Poppe G.T., Tagaro S.P. & Stahlschmidt P. (2015). New shelled molluscan species from the central Philippines I. Visaya. 4(3): 15-59.

page(s): 29, pl. 11 figs 1-2.
