= Fargoa gaudens =

Scientific classification
- Kingdom: Animalia
- Phylum: Mollusca
- Class: Gastropoda
- Family: Pyramidellidae
- Genus: Fargoa
- Species: F. gaudens

Binomial name
- Fargoa gaudens Odé, 1993

Synonyms
- Odostomia (Fargoa) gaudens (Odé, 1993)

Species of gastropod

Fargoa gaudens is a species of sea snail, a marine gastropod mollusk in the family Pyramidellidae, the pyrams and their allies.

== Description ==
The shell of this micromollusc grows to a length of 0.7 mm.

== Distribution ==
This species occurs in the following locations:

- Gulf of Mexico from Louisiana to Texas.
