= Spiralinella =

Scientific classification
- Domain: Eukaryota
- Kingdom: Animalia
- Phylum: Mollusca
- Class: Gastropoda
- Subcohort: Panpulmonata
- Superfamily: Pyramidelloidea
- Family: Pyramidellidae
- Genus: Spiralinella; Chaster, 1901

Type species
- Turbo spiralis Montagu, 1803

Synonyms
- Partulida Schaufuss, 1869 (unavailable name); Pyrgulina (Partulida) Schaufuss, 1869; Spiralina Chaster, 1898

Genus of gastropods

Spiralinella is a genus of very small sea snails, pyramidellid gastropod mollusks, or micromollusks.

== Nomenclature ==
Both this genus and its type species have had a very complicated synonymy. The status of the generic name Spiralinella in contrast to the names Partulida and Spiralina was clarified by Corgan (1973), and the nomenclatorical problems around the type species were discussed by van Aartsen & Gianuzzi-Savelli (1991).

== Life habits ==
Little is known about the biology of the members of this genus. As is true of most members of the Pyramidellidae sensu lato, they are most likely to be ectoparasites.

== Species ==
Species within the genus Spiralinella include:

- Spiralinella incerta (Milaschewich, 1916)
- Spiralinella marthinae (Nofroni & Schander, 1994)
- Spiralinella muinaiensis Saurin, 1962
- Spiralinella spiralis (Montagu, 1803) (Type species) (as Turbo spiralis)
