= Trabecula tani =

Scientific classification
- Kingdom: Animalia
- Phylum: Mollusca
- Class: Gastropoda
- Family: Pyramidellidae
- Genus: Trabecula
- Species: T. tani

Binomial name
- Trabecula tani Saurin, 1959

Synonyms
- Chrysallida (Trabecula) tani (Saurin, 1959)

Species of gastropod

Trabecula tani is a species of sea snail, a marine gastropod mollusk in the family Pyramidellidae, the pyrams and their allies.

== Distribution ==
This marine species occurs off Vietnam.
