= Chrysallida communis =

Scientific classification
- Kingdom: Animalia
- Phylum: Mollusca
- Class: Gastropoda
- Family: Pyramidellidae
- Genus: Chrysallida
- Species: C. communis

Binomial name
- Chrysallida communis (C.B. Adams, 1852)

Synonyms
- Chemnitzia communis C.B. Adams, 1852

Species of gastropod

Chrysallida communis is a species of sea snail, a marine gastropod mollusk in the family Pyramidellidae, the pyrams and their allies. The species is one of multiple species within the Chrysallida genus of gastropods.
