= Chrysallida annobonensis =

Scientific classification
- Kingdom: Animalia
- Phylum: Mollusca
- Class: Gastropoda
- Family: Pyramidellidae
- Genus: Chrysallida
- Species: C. annobonensis

Binomial name
- Chrysallida annobonensis Peñas & Rolán, 2002

Species of gastropod

Chrysallida annobonensis is a species of sea snail, a marine gastropod mollusk in the family Pyramidellidae, the pyrams and their allies. The species is one of multiple species within the large Chrysallida genus of gastropods.

== Distribution ==
This species only occurs on the island of Annobón, Equatorial Guinea.
