= Strioturbonilla =

Scientific classification
- Kingdom: Animalia
- Phylum: Mollusca
- Class: Gastropoda
- Subcohort: Panpulmonata
- Superfamily: Pyramidelloidea
- Family: Pyramidellidae
- Genus: Strioturbonilla; Sacco, 1892

Genus of gastropods

Strioturbonilla is a small genus of very small sea snails, marine gastropod molluscs or micromolluscs in the family Pyramidellidae, the pyrams and their allies, and the subfamily Chrysallidinae, a large taxon of minute marine gastropods with an intorted protoconch.

== Species ==
- † Strioturbonilla flexicostata (Maxwell, 1992)
- Strioturbonilla sigmoidea (Monterosato, 1880)
