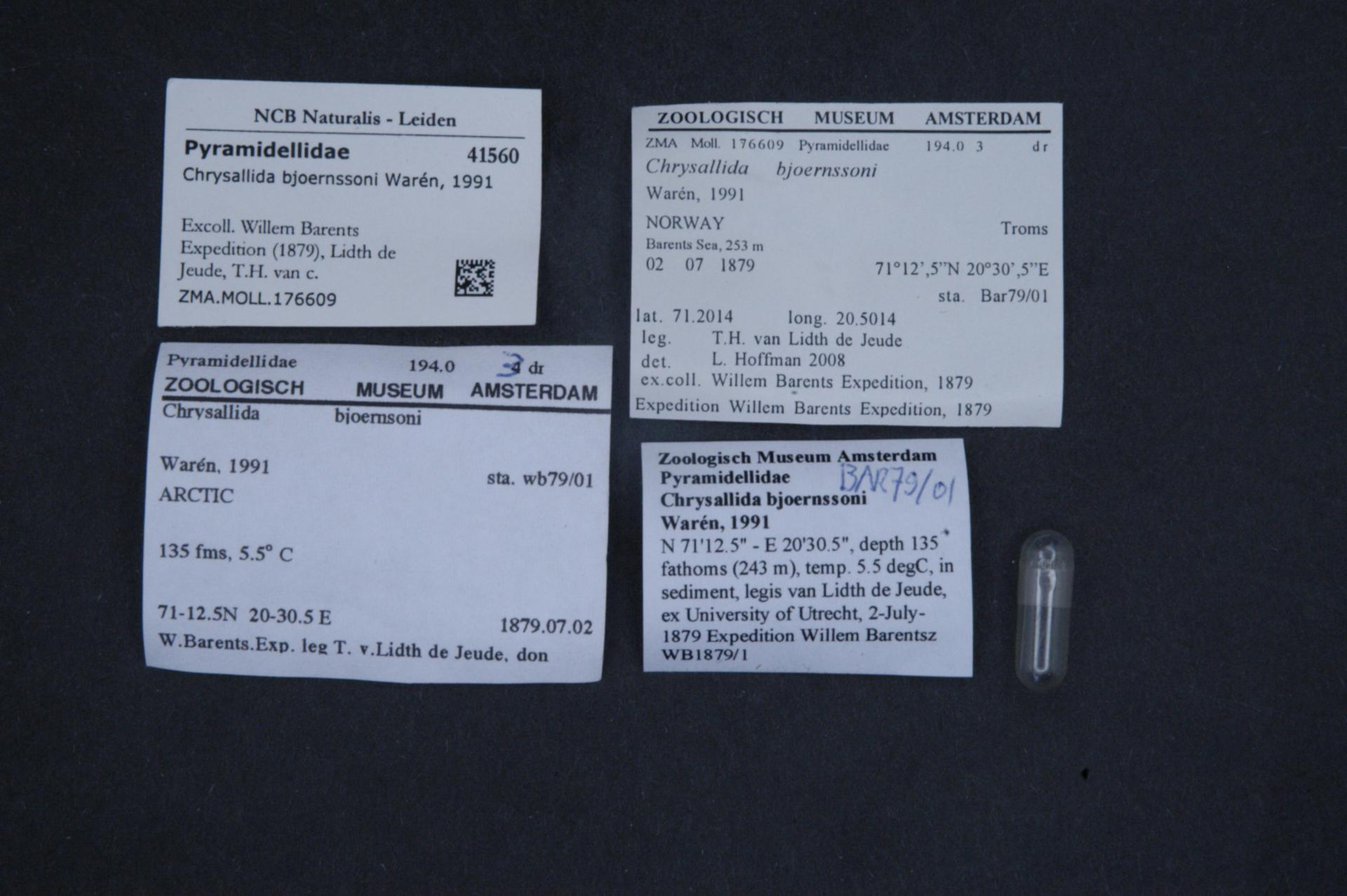

Scientific classification
- Kingdom: Animalia
- Phylum: Mollusca
- Class: Gastropoda
- Family: Pyramidellidae
- Genus: Chrysallida
- Species: C. bjoernssoni

Binomial name
- Chrysallida bjoernssoni Warén, 1991

= Chrysallida bjoernssoni =

Species of gastropod

Chrysallida bjoernssoni is a species of sea snail, a marine gastropod mollusk in the family Pyramidellidae, the pyrams and their allies. The species is one of many species within the Chrysallida genus of gastropods.

== Distribution ==
This species occurs in the following locations:

- European waters (ERMS scope), formerly the Mediterranean Sea.
