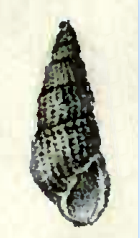
- Drawing of a shell of Mumiola spirata

Scientific classification
- Kingdom: Animalia
- Phylum: Mollusca
- Class: Gastropoda
- Family: Pyramidellidae
- Genus: Mumiola
- Species: M. spirata

Binomial name
- Mumiola spirata (A. Adams, 1853)

Synonyms
- Chrysallida (Mumiola) spirata (Adams, 1853); Monoptygma spirata Adams, 1853 (basionym)

= Mumiola spirata =

Species of gastropod

Mumiola spirata is a species of sea snail, a marine gastropod mollusk in the family Pyramidellidae, the pyrams and their allies.

== Description ==
The white shell is covered under a yellowish or brownish epidermis. Its length measures 7 mm. It is longitudinally plicate and transversely grooved. The sutures are channeled. The teleoconch contains eight gradate whorls. The columella has an oblique fold.

== Distribution ==
This species occurs in the Pacific Ocean off the Philippines and Japan.
