= Chrysallida vignali =

Scientific classification
- Kingdom: Animalia
- Phylum: Mollusca
- Class: Gastropoda
- Family: Pyramidellidae
- Genus: Chrysallida
- Species: C. vignali

Binomial name
- Chrysallida vignali (Lamy, 1910)

Synonyms
- Chrysallida (Pyrgulina) vignali Lamy, 1910

Species of gastropod

Chrysallida vignali is a species of sea snail, a marine gastropod mollusk in the family Pyramidellidae, the pyrams and their allies. The species is one of a number within the genus Chrysallida.

== Distribution ==
This species occurs in the following locations:

- Madagascar
