= Chrysallida ryalli =

Scientific classification
- Kingdom: Animalia
- Phylum: Mollusca
- Class: Gastropoda
- Family: Pyramidellidae
- Genus: Chrysallida
- Species: C. ryalli

Binomial name
- Chrysallida ryalli Peñas & Rolán, 2002

Species of gastropod

Chrysallida ryalli is a species of sea snail, a marine gastropod mollusk in the family Pyramidellidae, the pyrams and their allies. The species is one of a number within the gastropod genus Chrysallida.
