= Chrysallida turbonillaeformis =

Scientific classification
- Kingdom: Animalia
- Phylum: Mollusca
- Class: Gastropoda
- Family: Pyramidellidae
- Genus: Chrysallida
- Species: C. turbonillaeformis

Binomial name
- Chrysallida turbonillaeformis van Aartsen, Gittenberger & Goud, 2000

Species of gastropod

Chrysallida turbonillaeformis is a species of sea snail, a marine gastropod mollusk in the family Pyramidellidae, the pyrams and their allies. The species is one of a number within the gastropod genus Chrysallida.

== Distribution ==
This species occurs in the following locations:

- Cape Verde archipelago
