= Trabecula truncatelliformis =

Scientific classification
- Kingdom: Animalia
- Phylum: Mollusca
- Class: Gastropoda
- Family: Pyramidellidae
- Genus: Trabecula
- Species: T. truncatelliformis

Binomial name
- Trabecula truncatelliformis Hori & Fukuda, 1999

Species of gastropod

Trabecula truncatelliformis is a species of sea snail, a marine gastropod mollusk in the family Pyramidellidae, the pyrams and their allies.

== Distribution ==
This marine species occurs off Japan.
