= Chrysallida boucheti =

Scientific classification
- Kingdom: Animalia
- Phylum: Mollusca
- Class: Gastropoda
- Family: Pyramidellidae
- Genus: Chrysallida
- Species: C. boucheti

Binomial name
- Chrysallida boucheti Peñas & Rolán, 1999

Species of gastropod

Chrysallida boucheti is a species of sea snail, a marine gastropod mollusk in the family Pyramidellidae, the pyrams and their allies. The species is one of multiple species within the Chrysallida genus of gastropods.

== Distribution ==
This species occurs in the Irving and Hyères Seamounts, Northern Atlantic Ocean, between 670 and 1060 m depth.

== Habitat ==
The species is known from seamounts and underwater knolls.
