= Chrysallida thetisae =

Scientific classification
- Kingdom: Animalia
- Phylum: Mollusca
- Class: Gastropoda
- Family: Pyramidellidae
- Genus: Chrysallida
- Species: C. thetisae

Binomial name
- Chrysallida thetisae Espinosa & Ortea, 2011

Species of gastropod

Chrysallida thetisae is a species of sea snail, a marine gastropod mollusk in the family Pyramidellidae, the pyrams and their allies. The species is one of a number within the genus Chrysallida.
