= Chrysallida stefanisi =

Scientific classification
- Kingdom: Animalia
- Phylum: Mollusca
- Class: Gastropoda
- Family: Pyramidellidae
- Genus: Chrysallida
- Species: C. stefanisi

Binomial name
- Chrysallida stefanisi (Jeffreys, 1869)

Synonyms
- Rissoa stefanisi Jeffreys, 1869

Species of gastropod

Chrysallida stefanisi is a species of sea snail, a marine gastropod mollusk in the family Pyramidellidae, the pyrams and their allies. The species is one of a number within the gastropod genus Chrysallida.

== Distribution ==
This species occurs in the following locations:

- Azores Exclusive Economic Zone
- European waters (ERMS scope)
