= Chrysallida gemmulosa =

Scientific classification
- Kingdom: Animalia
- Phylum: Mollusca
- Class: Gastropoda
- Family: Pyramidellidae
- Genus: Chrysallida
- Species: C. gemmulosa

Binomial name
- Chrysallida gemmulosa (C. B. Adams, 1850)

Species of gastropod

Chrysallida gemmulosa is a species of sea snail, a marine gastropod mollusk in the family Pyramidellidae, the pyrams and their allies. The species is one of a number within the genus Chrysallida.

== Distribution ==
This species occurs in the following locations:

- Caribbean Sea
- Colombia
- Cuba
- Gulf of Mexico
- Jamaica
- Mexico
- Panama
- Puerto Rico
