= Chrysallida pelorcei =

Scientific classification
- Kingdom: Animalia
- Phylum: Mollusca
- Class: Gastropoda
- Family: Pyramidellidae
- Genus: Chrysallida
- Species: C. pelorcei

Binomial name
- Chrysallida pelorcei Peñas & Rolán, 1998

Species of gastropod

Chrysallida pelorcei is a species of sea snail, a marine gastropod mollusk in the family Pyramidellidae, the pyrams and their allies. The species is one of a number within the genus Chrysallida.

== Distribution ==
- Marine
