= Turbonilla amoena =

Scientific classification
- Kingdom: Animalia
- Phylum: Mollusca
- Class: Gastropoda
- Family: Pyramidellidae
- Genus: Turbonilla
- Species: T. amoena

Binomial name
- Turbonilla amoena (Monterosato, 1878)

Synonyms
- Chrysallida brevicula (Jeffreys, 1883); Odostomia (Turbonilla) venusta Monterosato, 1875; Odostomia amoena Monterosato, 1878 (original combination); Odostomia brevicula Jeffreys, 1883 (invalid: junior homonym of Odostomia brevicula A. Adams, 1861); Odostomia compressa (Jeffreys, 1884); Odostomia venusta Monterosato, 1875 (Invalid: junior secondary homonym of Turbonilla venusta Issel, 1869; Odostomia amoena is a replacement name); Pyrgulina abbreviata Monterosato, 1884; Turbonilla compressa (Jeffreys, 1884)

Species of gastropod

Turbonilla amoena is a species of sea snail, a marine gastropod in the family Pyramidellidae, the pyrams and their allies.

== Distribution ==
This species occurs in the following locations:

- Atlantic (Europe)
- Azores
- Canary Islands
- Cape Verde
- European waters (ERMS scope)
- Mediterranean Sea
- Morocco

== Description ==
(Original description of Odostomia brevicula, Jeffreys, 1883) The conical shell is solid, opaque, and glossy. The sculpture is short, strong, and straight. It shows rather sharp longitudinal ribs, of which there are about a dozen on the body whorl. They terminate abruptly at the periphery, which is bluntly angulated. The interstices of the ribs have an excavated appearance. Under the microscope, the whole surface is covered lengthwise with very fine and close-set striae. The apex is quite smooth and polished. The color is clear white. The spire is short. It contains four whorls (besides the bulbous and heterostrophe embryonic nucleus), compressed, and gradually enlarging. The body whorl is almost equal to half the spire. The suture is shallow and nearly straight. The aperture is oval, pointed at the base. The tooth is small and indistinct, tubercular, and placed on the upper part of the columella. There is no umbilicus.
