= Mumiola gradatula =

Scientific classification
- Kingdom: Animalia
- Phylum: Mollusca
- Class: Gastropoda
- Family: Pyramidellidae
- Genus: Mumiola
- Species: M. gradatula

Binomial name
- Mumiola gradatula (Mörch, 1876)

Synonyms
- Odostomia toroensis (Olsson & McGinty, 1958); Rissoa toroensis Olsson & McGinty, 1958

Species of gastropod

Mumiola gradatula is a species of sea snail, a marine gastropod mollusk in the family Pyramidellidae, the pyrams and their allies.

== Distribution ==
This species occurs in the following locations:

- Caribbean Sea
- Costa Rica
- Gulf of Mexico
- Hispaniola
- Jamaica
- Lesser Antilles
- Panama
