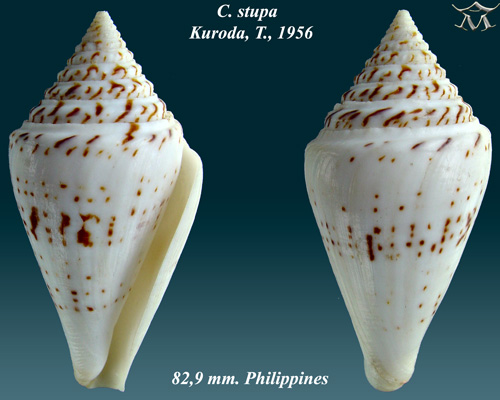
- Apertural and abapertural views of shell of Conus stupa Kuroda, T., 1956

Conservation status
- Least Concern (IUCN 3.1)

Scientific classification
- Kingdom: Animalia
- Phylum: Mollusca
- Class: Gastropoda
- Subclass: Caenogastropoda
- Order: Neogastropoda
- Superfamily: Conoidea
- Family: Conidae
- Genus: Conus
- Species: C. stupa

Binomial name
- Conus stupa (Kuroda, 1956)

Synonyms
- Conus (Turriconus) stupa (Kuroda, 1956) · accepted, alternate representation; Embrikena stupa Kuroda, 1956; Kurodaconus stupa (Kuroda, 1956); Turriconus (Kurodaconus) stupa (Kuroda, 1956)

= Conus stupa =

Species of sea snail

Conus stupa is a species of sea snail, a marine gastropod mollusk in the family Conidae, the cone snails and their allies.

Like all species within the genus Conus, these snails are predatory and venomous; they are capable of stinging humans.

== Description ==
The size of the shell varies between 43 mm and 100 mm. Conus Stupa, members of the order Neogastropoda are mostly gonochoric and broadcast spawners. Their life cycle consists of embryos developing into planktonic trochophore larvae, later into juvenile veligers, and then fully grown adults.

== Distribution ==
This marine species occurs from Vietnam and the Philippines to Japan; off the Solomon Islands and the Loyalty Islands.

== Bibliography ==
- Tucker J.K. & Tenorio M.J. (2009) Systematic classification of Recent and fossil conoidean gastropods. Hackenheim: Conchbooks. 296 pp.
- Monnier E., Limpalaër L., Robin A. & Roux C. (2018). A taxonomic iconography of living Conidae. Harxheim: ConchBooks. 2 vols. 1205 pp.page(s): 343
- Puillandre N., Duda T.F., Meyer C., Olivera B.M. & Bouchet P. (2015). One, four or 100 genera? A new classification of the cone snails. Journal of Molluscan Studies. 81: 1–23
