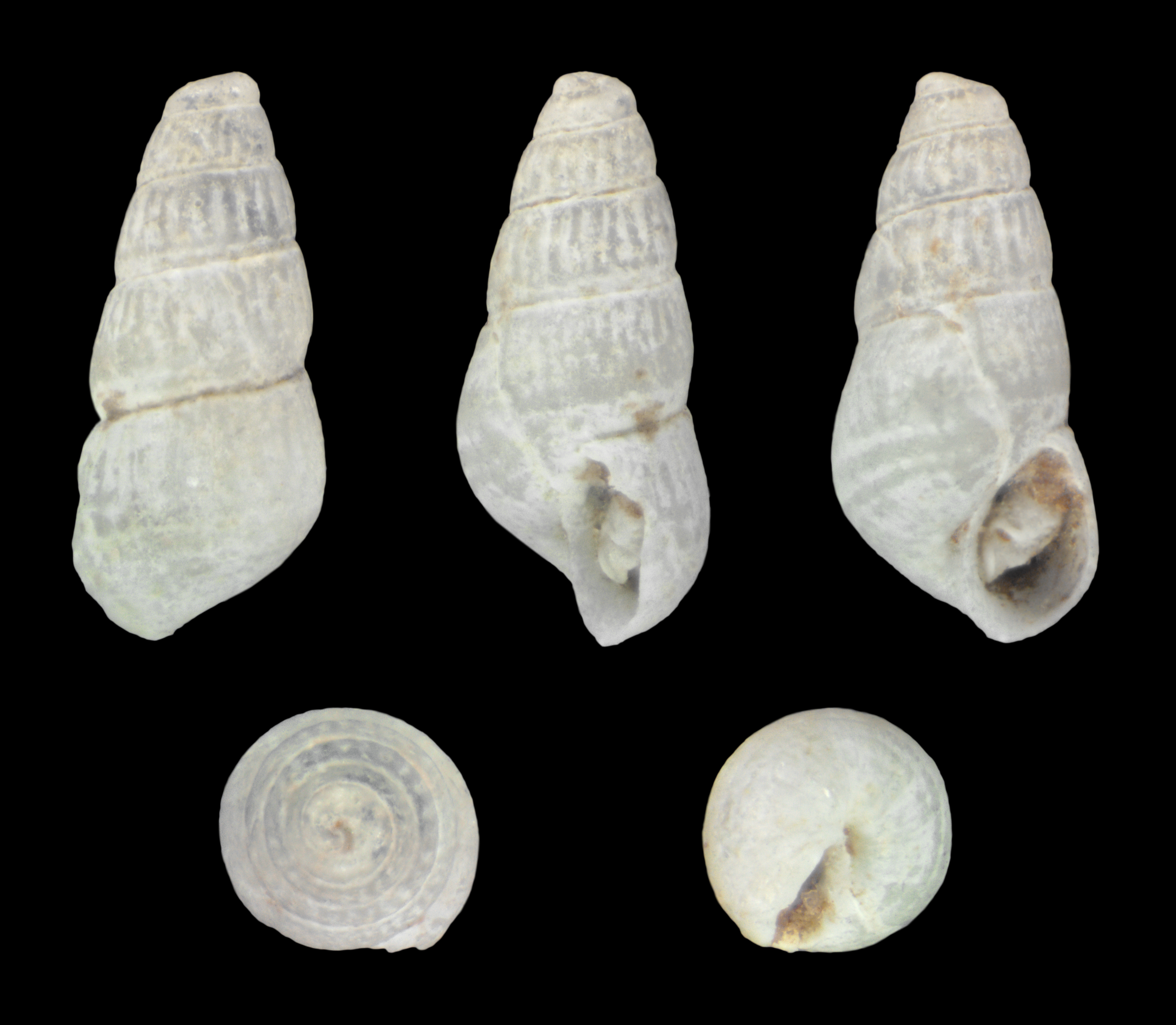

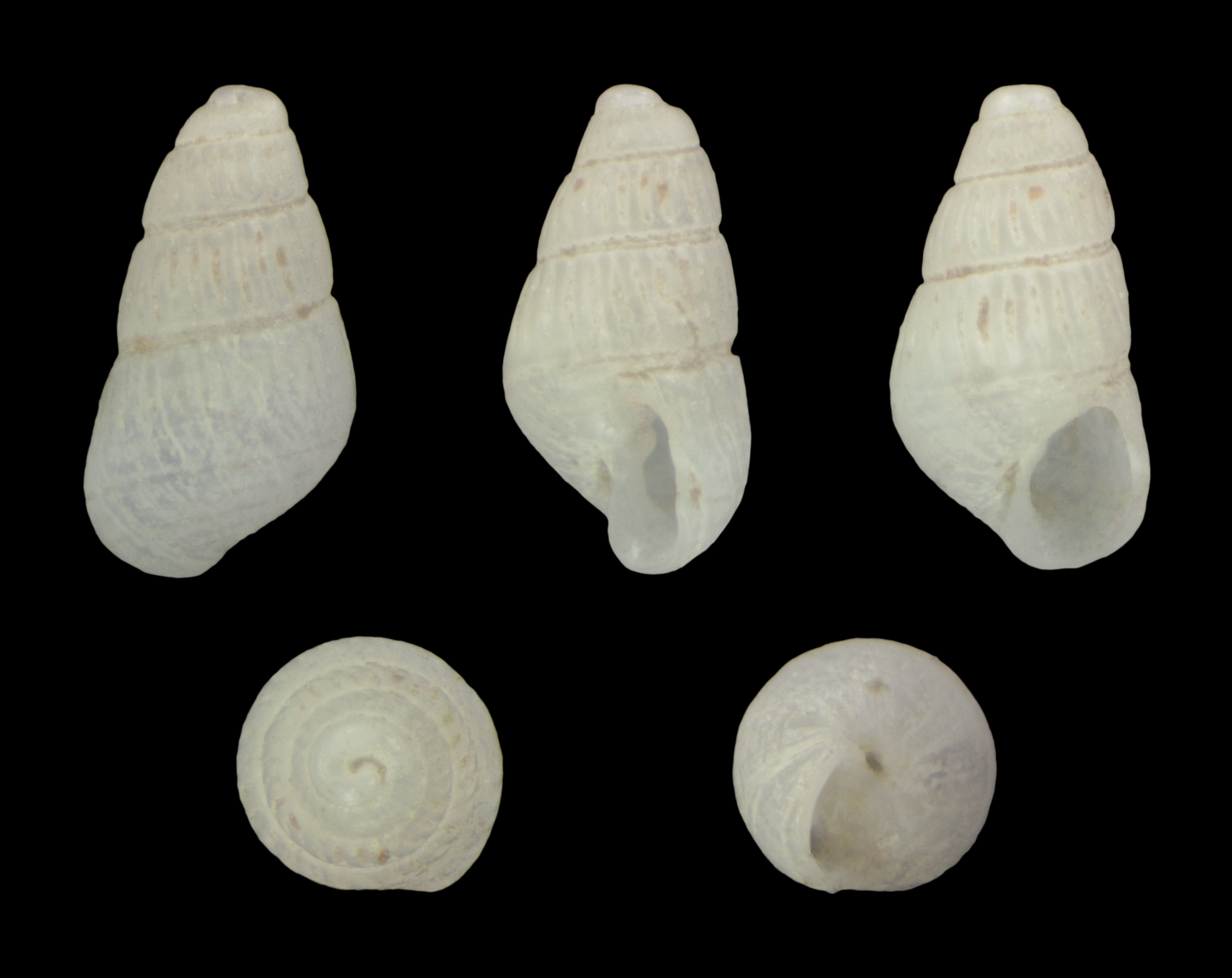

Scientific classification
- Kingdom: Animalia
- Phylum: Mollusca
- Class: Gastropoda
- Family: Pyramidellidae
- Genus: Spiralinella
- Species: S. spiralis

Binomial name
- Spiralinella spiralis (Montagu, 1803)

Synonyms
- Chrysallida lacourti F. Nordsieck, 1972; Chrysallida pellucida (Dillwyn, 1817); Chrysallida spiralis (Montagu, 1803); Odostomia plicatula MacGillivray, 1843; Partulida pellucida (Dillwyn, 1817); Partulida spiralis (Montagu, 1803); Turbo spiralis Montagu, 1803; Voluta pellucida Dillwyn, 1817

= Spiralinella spiralis =

Species of gastropod

Spiralinella spiralis is a species of sea snail, a marine gastropod mollusk in the family Pyramidellidae, the pyrams and their allies.

== Nomenclature ==
Høisæter (2014) advocated using the well-known specific name spiralis (Montagu, 1803) for this species, although Turbo spiralis Montagu, 1803 is a primary homonym of Turbo spiralis Poiret, 1801. The latter name could meet the conditions for being declared nomen oblitum but so far Høisæter (2014) did not provide the citations required by ICZN Art. 23.9 to make the declaration effective.

== Distribution ==
This marine species occurs in the following locations:

- Belgian Exclusive Economic Zone
- British Isles
- European waters (ERMS scope)
- Goote Bank
- Irish Exclusive economic Zone
- Portuguese Exclusive Economic Zone
- Spanish Exclusive Economic Zone
- United Kingdom Exclusive Economic Zone
- West Coast of Norway
- Wimereux
