= Kongsrudia ersei =

Scientific classification
- Kingdom: Animalia
- Phylum: Mollusca
- Class: Gastropoda
- Family: Pyramidellidae
- Genus: Kongsrudia
- Species: K. ersei

Binomial name
- Kongsrudia ersei (Schander, 1994)

Synonyms
- Chrysallida ersei Schander, 1994

Species of gastropod

Kongsrudia ersei is a species of sea snail, a marine gastropod mollusk in the family Pyramidellidae, the pyrams and their allies.
