= Kongsrudia mutata =

Scientific classification
- Kingdom: Animalia
- Phylum: Mollusca
- Class: Gastropoda
- Family: Pyramidellidae
- Genus: Kongsrudia
- Species: K. mutata

Binomial name
- Kongsrudia mutata (Dautzenberg, 1912)

Synonyms
- Chrysallida mutata (Dautzenberg, 1912); Pyrgulina mutata Dautzenberg, 1912

Species of gastropod

Kongsrudia mutata is a species of sea snail, a marine gastropod mollusk in the family Pyramidellidae, the pyrams and their allies.
