= Spiralinella marthinae =

Scientific classification
- Kingdom: Animalia
- Phylum: Mollusca
- Class: Gastropoda
- Family: Pyramidellidae
- Genus: Spiralinella
- Species: S. marthinae

Binomial name
- Spiralinella marthinae (Nofroni & Schander, 1994)

Synonyms
- Chrysallida marthinae Nofroni & Schander, 1994 (original combination); Partulida marthinae (Nofroni & Schander, 1994)

Species of gastropod

Spiralinella marthinae is a species of sea snail, a marine gastropod mollusk in the family Pyramidellidae, the pyrams and their allies.

== Taxonomy ==
Following Giannuzzi-Savelli et al. (2014) for generic allocation, but taking into account that Spiralinella is the valid generic name, not Partulida Schaufuss, 1869 (unavailable)

== Distribution ==
This marine species occurs in the following locations:

- European waters (ERMS scope)
- Portuguese Exclusive Economic Zone
- Spanish Exclusive Economic Zone
