= Kongsrudia approximans =

Scientific classification
- Kingdom: Animalia
- Phylum: Mollusca
- Class: Gastropoda
- Family: Pyramidellidae
- Genus: Kongsrudia
- Species: K. approximans

Binomial name
- Kongsrudia approximans (Dautzenberg, 1912)

Synonyms
- Chrysallida approximans (Dautzenberg, 1912); Pyrgulina approximans Dautzenberg, 1912

Species of gastropod

Kongsrudia approximans is a species of sea snail, a marine gastropod mollusk in the family Pyramidellidae, the pyrams and their allies.

== Description ==
The shell grows to a length of 5 mm.

== Distribution ==
This species occurs in the Atlantic Ocean off Senegal.
