= Tragula falcifera =

Scientific classification
- Kingdom: Animalia
- Phylum: Mollusca
- Class: Gastropoda
- Family: Pyramidellidae
- Genus: Tragula
- Species: T. falcifera

Binomial name
- Tragula falcifera (Watson, 1881)

Synonyms
- Chrysallida falcifera (Watson, 1881); Dunkeria falcifera Watson, 1881; Turbonilla falcifera (Watson, 1881)

Species of gastropod

Tragula falcifera is a species of sea snail, a marine gastropod mollusk in the family Pyramidellidae, the pyrams and their allies.

== Description ==
The shell grows to a length of approximately 6.6 millimeters, relatively larger in size than the vast majority of other shells within this genus.

== Distribution ==
The type specimen of this marine species was found off the coast of Bermudas at a depth of 1966 meters, an exceedingly deep elevation for this genus of Pyramidellidae, considering most of these mollusks do not exceed such depths as 1.966 kilometers.
