= Parthenina flexuosa =

Scientific classification
- Kingdom: Animalia
- Phylum: Mollusca
- Class: Gastropoda
- Family: Pyramidellidae
- Genus: Parthenina
- Species: P. flexuosa

Binomial name
- Parthenina flexuosa (Monterosato, 1874)

Synonyms
- Chrysallida flexuosa (Monterosato, 1874); Chrysallida interspatiosa van der Linden & Eikenboom, 1992; Odostomia flexuosa Monterosato, 1874 (original combination)

Species of gastropod

Parthenina flexuosa is a species of sea snail, a marine gastropod mollusk in the family Pyramidellidae, the pyrams and their allies.

== Distribution ==
This marine species occurs in the following locations:

- European waters (ERMS scope)
- Greek Exclusive Economic Zone
- Portuguese Exclusive Economic Zone
- Spanish Exclusive Economic Zone

== Notes ==
Additional information regarding this species:

- Habitat: Known from seamounts and knolls
