= Tragula fenestrata =

Scientific classification
- Kingdom: Animalia
- Phylum: Mollusca
- Class: Gastropoda
- Family: Pyramidellidae
- Genus: Tragula
- Species: T. fenestrata

Binomial name
- Tragula fenestrata (Jeffreys, 1848)

Synonyms
- Chemnitzia rigacci Conti, A., 1864; Chrysallida fenestrata (Jeffreys, 1848); Odostomia fenestrata Jeffreys, 1848; Turbonilla weinkauffi Dunker, R.W., 1862

Species of gastropod

Tragula fenestrata is a species of sea snail, a marine gastropod mollusk in the family Pyramidellidae, the pyrams and their allies.

== Distribution ==
This species has a wide distribution and occurs in the following locations:

- Eastern Mediterranean Sea (Greece)
- Western Mediterranean Sea (Spain)
- Atlantic Ocean (Portugal)
