= Chrysallida stupa =

Scientific classification
- Kingdom: Animalia
- Phylum: Mollusca
- Class: Gastropoda
- Family: Pyramidellidae
- Genus: Chrysallida
- Species: C. stupa

Binomial name
- Chrysallida stupa Hori & Fukuda, 1999

Species of gastropod

Chrysallida stupa is a species of sea snail, a marine gastropod mollusk in the family Pyramidellidae, the pyrams and their allies. The species is one of a number within the genus Chrysallida.
