= Fargoa bushiana =

Scientific classification
- Kingdom: Animalia
- Phylum: Mollusca
- Class: Gastropoda
- Family: Pyramidellidae
- Genus: Fargoa
- Species: F. bushiana

Binomial name
- Fargoa bushiana (Bartsch, 1909)

Synonyms
- Odostomia bushiana (Bartsch, 1909)

Species of gastropod

Fargoa bushiana is a species of sea snail, a marine gastropod mollusk in the family Pyramidellidae, the pyrams and their allies.

== Description ==
The shell grows to a length of 3.7 mm.

== Distribution ==
This species occurs in the following locations:

- Caribbean Sea
- Colombia
- Gulf of Mexico
- Lesser Antilles
- Atlantic Ocean (Massachusetts to Central Brazil)

== Notes ==
Additional information regarding this species:

- Distribution: Cape Cod to Rhode Island; Texas
