= Spiralinella incerta =

Scientific classification
- Kingdom: Animalia
- Phylum: Mollusca
- Class: Gastropoda
- Family: Pyramidellidae
- Genus: Spiralinella
- Species: S. incerta

Binomial name
- Spiralinella incerta (Milaschewich, 1916)

Synonyms
- Chrysallida brusinai (Cossmann, 1921); Chrysallida incerta (Milaschewitsch, 1916); Odostomia turbonilloides Brusina, 1869 (junior homonym of Odostomia turbonilloides Deshayes, 1861); Parthenia incerta Milaschewitsch, 1916; Partulida incerta (Milaschewich, 1916); Pyrgulina brusinai Cossmann, 1921

Species of gastropod

Spiralinella incerta is a rather widely distributed species of sea snail, a marine gastropod mollusk in the family Pyramidellidae, the pyrams and their allies.

== Taxonomy ==
Following Giannuzzi-Savelli et al. (2014) for generic allocation, but taking into account that Spiralinella is the valid generic name, not Partulida Schaufuss, 1869 (unavailable).

== Distribution ==
This marine species occurs in the following locations:

- Angola
- Canary Islands
- Cape Verde
- European waters (ERMS scope)
- Greek Exclusive Economic Zone
- Mediterranean Sea
- Portuguese Exclusive Economic Zone
- Principe Archipelagos
- São Tomé
- South West Coast of Apulia
- Spanish Exclusive Economic Zone
