= Trabecula kronenbergi =

Scientific classification
- Kingdom: Animalia
- Phylum: Mollusca
- Class: Gastropoda
- Family: Pyramidellidae
- Genus: Trabecula
- Species: T. kronenbergi

Binomial name
- Trabecula kronenbergi van Aartsen, Gittenberger & Goud, 2000

Synonyms
- Chrysallida (Trabecula) kronenbergi van Aartsen, Gittenberger & Goud, 2000

Species of gastropod

Trabecula kronenbergi is a species of sea snail, a marine gastropod mollusk in the family Pyramidellidae, the pyrams and their allies.
