= Parthenina interstincta =

Scientific classification
- Kingdom: Animalia
- Phylum: Mollusca
- Class: Gastropoda
- Family: Pyramidellidae
- Genus: Parthenina
- Species: P. interstincta

Binomial name
- Parthenina interstincta (Adams J., 1797)

Synonyms
- Chrysallida farolita F. Nordsieck, 1972; Chrysallida interstincta (J. Adams, 1797); Chrysallida obtusa (Brown, 1827); Elodia hortensiae de Nansouty in de Folin & Périer, 1872; Jaminia obtusa T. Brown, 1827; Odostomia interstincta (Adams J., 1797); Odostomia jeffreysi var. flexicosta Bucquoy, Dautzenberg & Dollfus, 1883; Parthenina flexicosta Locard, 1886; Tiberia pretiosa Coen, 1933; Tiberiella pretiosa Coen, 1933; Turbo interstinctus J. Adams, 1797 (original combination)

Species of gastropod

Parthenina interstincta is a rather widely distributed species of sea snail, a marine gastropod mollusk in the family Pyramidellidae, the pyrams and their allies.

== Distribution ==
This marine species occurs in the following locations:

- Northern Atlantic Ocean off the west coasts of the continent Europe
- Belgian Exclusive Economic Zone (50°51′N 4°21′E)
- Canary Islands (28°1′N 15°4′W)
- Cape Verde archipelago (14°55′N 23°31′W)
- European waters (ERMS scope)
- Greek Exclusive Economic Zone (37°58′N 23°43′E)
- Irish Exclusive economic Zone (53°20′N 8°00′W)
- Italy (41°54′N 12°29′E)
- Madeira (32°39′4″N 16°54′35″W)
- Mediterranean Sea (35°N 18°E)
- Morocco
- Portuguese Exclusive Economic Zone (38°46′N 9°9′W)
- Spanish Exclusive Economic Zone (40°26′N 3°42′W)
- Ukrainian Exclusive Economic Zone (50°27′N 30°30′E)
- United Kingdom Exclusive Economic Zone (51°30′N 0°7′W)
- Wimereux
