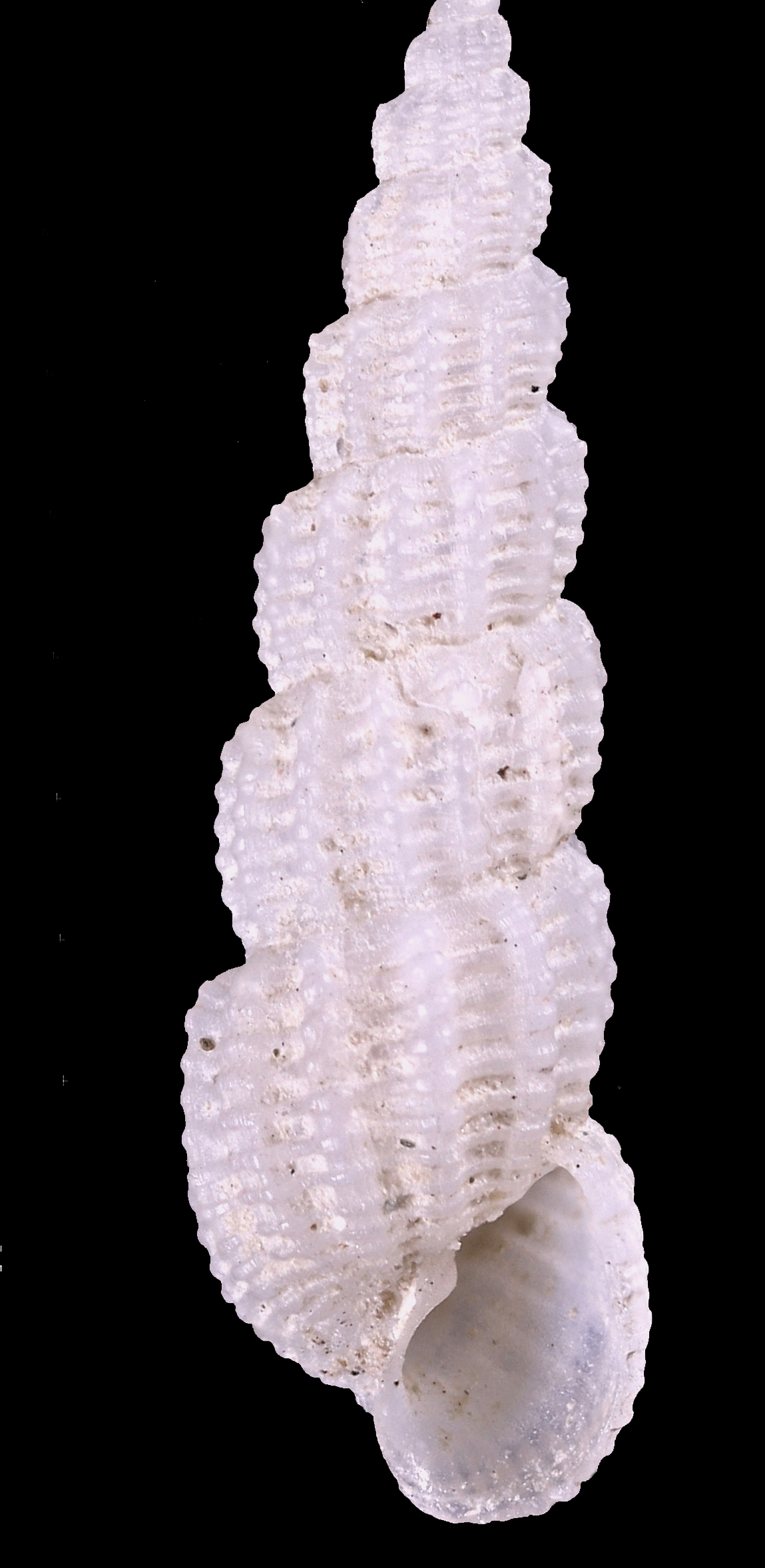
- Shell of Kongsrudia gruveli (lectotype at MNHN, Paris)

Scientific classification
- Kingdom: Animalia
- Phylum: Mollusca
- Class: Gastropoda
- Family: Pyramidellidae
- Genus: Kongsrudia
- Species: K. gruveli

Binomial name
- Kongsrudia gruveli (Dautzenberg, 1910)

Synonyms
- Actaeopyramis gruveli Dautzenberg, 1910; Chrysallida gruveli (Dautzenberg, 1910); Pyrgulina bavayi Dautzenberg, 1912

= Kongsrudia gruveli =

Species of gastropod

Kongsrudia gruveli is a species of sea snail, a marine gastropod mollusk in the family Pyramidellidae, the pyrams and their allies.

== Etymology ==
The snail is named after Jean Abel Gruvel.

== Description ==
The length of the shell attains 4 mm.

== Distribution ==
This marine species occurs off Senegal.
