= Parthenina monozona =

Scientific classification
- Kingdom: Animalia
- Phylum: Mollusca
- Class: Gastropoda
- Family: Pyramidellidae
- Genus: Parthenina
- Species: P. monozona

Binomial name
- Parthenina monozona (Brusina, 1869)

Synonyms
- Chrysallida intermixta (Monterosato, 1884); Chrysallida monozona (Brusina, 1869); Odostomia jeffreysi Bucquoy, Dautzenberg & Dollfus, 1883; Odostomia monozona Brusina, 1869 (original combination); Odostomia (Pyrgulina) monozona- Monterosato,1877b; Parthenina intermixta (Monterosato, 1884) (senior synonymy); Pyrgulina intermixta Monterosato, 1884

Species of gastropod

Parthenina monozona is a species of sea snail, a marine gastropod mollusk in the family Pyramidellidae, the pyrams and their allies.

== Distribution ==
This marine species occurs in the following locations:

- European waters (ERMS scope)
- Greek Exclusive Economic Zone
- Italy
- Mediterranean Sea
- Portuguese Exclusive Economic Zone
- Spanish Exclusive Economic Zone
- United Kingdom Exclusive Economic Zone

== Notes ==
Additional information regarding this species:

- Habitat: Known from rocky shores.
