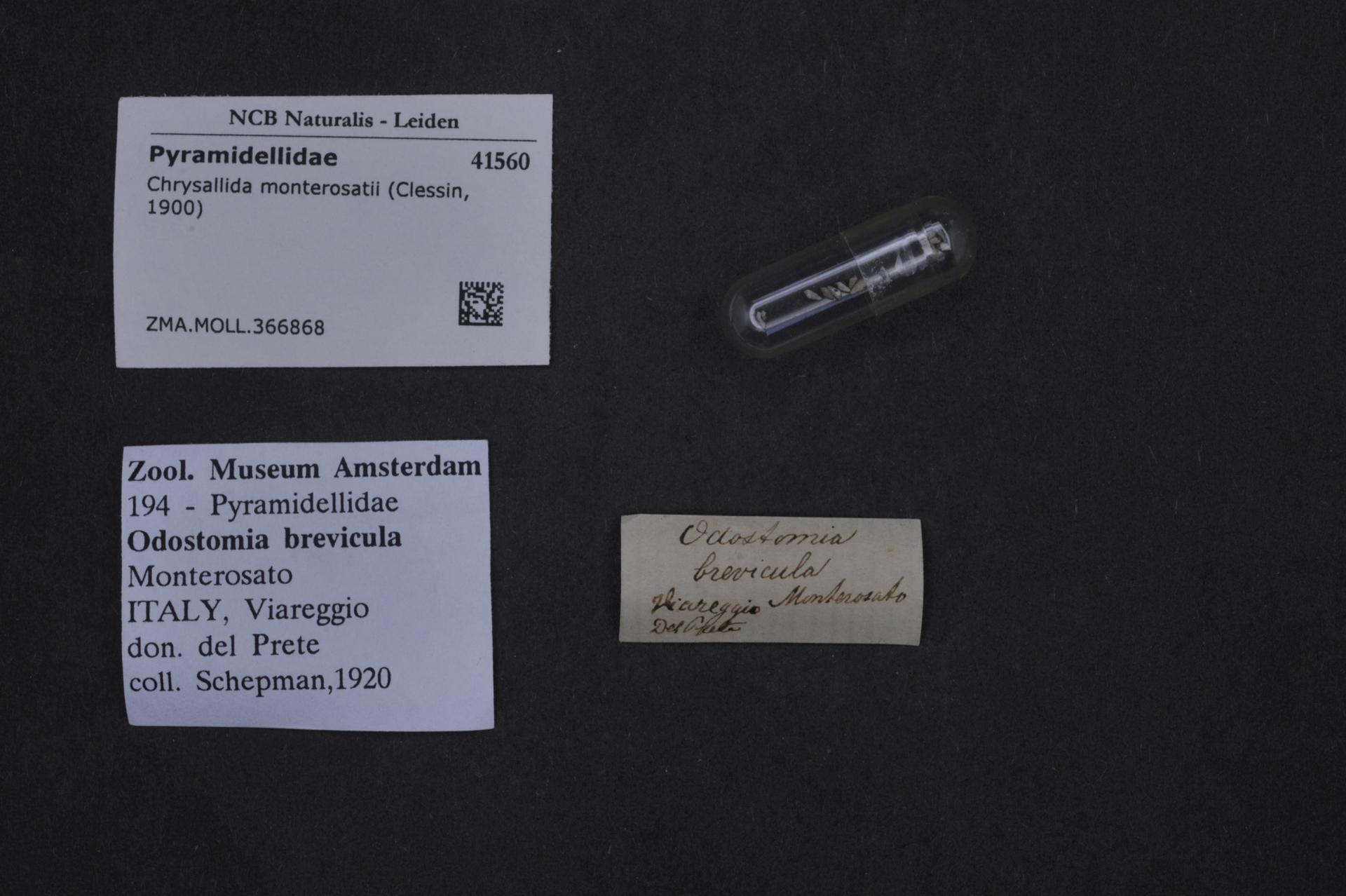
- Chrysallida monterosatii (Clessin, 1900)

Scientific classification
- Kingdom: Animalia
- Phylum: Mollusca
- Class: Gastropoda
- Family: Pyramidellidae
- Genus: Parthenina
- Species: P. monterosatii

Binomial name
- Parthenina monterosatii (Clessin, 1900)

Synonyms
- Chrysallida alleryi (Kobelt, 1903); Chrysallida monterosatii (Clessin, 1900); Parthenia (Pyrgulina) alleryi Kobelt, 1903; Parthenia monterosatii Clessin, 1900 (original combination); Pyrgulina brevicula Monterosato, 1884

= Parthenina monterosatii =

Species of gastropod

Parthenina monterosatii is a species of sea snail, a marine gastropod mollusk in the family Pyramidellidae, the pyrams and their allies.

== Distribution ==
This marine species occurs in the following locations:

- European waters (ERMS scope)
- Greek Exclusive Economic Zone
