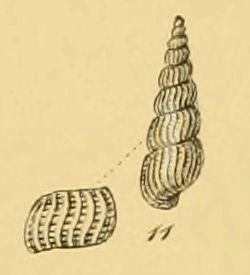

Scientific classification
- Kingdom: Animalia
- Phylum: Mollusca
- Class: Gastropoda
- Family: Pyramidellidae
- Genus: Parthenina
- Species: P. indistincta

Binomial name
- Parthenina indistincta (Montagu, 1808)

Synonyms
- Chrysallida indistincta (Montagu, 1808); Odostomia indistincta (Montagu, 1808); Odostomia indistincta var. brevior Jeffreys, 1867; Pyrgulina indistincta (Montagu, 1808); Terebra speciosa Bean in Thorpe, 1844; Turbo indistinctus Montagu, 1808 (original combination); Turbonilla delpretei Sulliotti, 1889; Turbonilla indistincta (Montagu, 1808)

= Parthenina indistincta =

Species of gastropod

Parthenina indistincta is a species of sea snail, a marine gastropod mollusk in the family Pyramidellidae, the pyrams and their allies.

== Distribution ==
This marine species occurs in the following locations:

- European waters (ERMS scope)
- Greek Exclusive Economic Zone
- Irish Exclusive economic Zone
- Portuguese Exclusive Economic Zone
- Spanish Exclusive Economic Zone
- United Kingdom Exclusive Economic Zone
