= Trabecula jeffreysiana =

Scientific classification
- Kingdom: Animalia
- Phylum: Mollusca
- Class: Gastropoda
- Family: Pyramidellidae
- Genus: Trabecula
- Species: T. jeffreysiana

Binomial name
- Trabecula jeffreysiana Monterosato, 1884

Synonyms
- Chrysallida jeffreysiana (Monterosato, 1884); Chrysallida undata (Watson, 1897); Odostomella jeffreysiana (Monterosato, 1884); Odostomia seguenzai Pallary, 1912

Species of gastropod

Trabecula jeffreysiana is a species of very small sea snail, a marine gastropod mollusk in the family Pyramidellidae, the pyrams and their allies.

== Taxonomy ==
This species has been generally cited in the combinations Chrysallida jeffreysiana or Odostomella jeffreysiana but must be restored to its original combination since Trabecula is currently treated as a valid genus.

== Distribution ==
This marine species occurs in the Mediterranean Sea and in the Atlantic Ocean off Madeira, the Canary Islands and Mauritania.
