= Strioturbonilla sigmoidea =

Scientific classification
- Kingdom: Animalia
- Phylum: Mollusca
- Class: Gastropoda
- Family: Pyramidellidae
- Genus: Strioturbonilla
- Species: S. sigmoidea

Binomial name
- Strioturbonilla sigmoidea (Monterosato, 1880)

Synonyms
- Chrysallida sigmoidea (Monterosato, 1880); Odostomia sigmoidea Monterosato, 1880 (original combination)

Species of gastropod

Strioturbonilla sigmoidea is a species of sea snail, a marine gastropod mollusk in the family Pyramidellidae, the pyrams and their allies.

== Distribution ==
This marine species occurs in the following locations:

- Angola
- Atlantic Europe
- European waters (ERMS scope)
- Mediterranean Sea
- Morocco
- Portuguese Exclusive Economic Zone
- Spanish Exclusive Economic Zone
- United Kingdom Exclusive Economic Zone
- West Africa
