= Parthenina multicostata =

Scientific classification
- Kingdom: Animalia
- Phylum: Mollusca
- Class: Gastropoda
- Family: Pyramidellidae
- Genus: Parthenina
- Species: P. multicostata

Binomial name
- Parthenina multicostata (Jeffreys, 1884)

Synonyms
- Chrysallida multicostata (Jeffreys, 1884); Odostomia interstincta var. multicostata Jeffreys, 1884 (original combination)

Species of gastropod

Parthenina multicostata is a species of sea snail, a marine gastropod mollusk in the family Pyramidellidae, the pyrams and their allies.
