= Parthenina dollfusi =

Scientific classification
- Kingdom: Animalia
- Phylum: Mollusca
- Class: Gastropoda
- Family: Pyramidellidae
- Genus: Parthenina
- Species: P. dollfusi

Binomial name
- Parthenina dollfusi (Kobelt, 1903)

Synonyms
- Chrysallida colungiana F. Nordsieck, 1972; Chrysallida dollfusi (Kobelt, 1903)

Species of gastropod

Parthenina dollfusi is a species of sea snail, a marine gastropod mollusk in the family Pyramidellidae, the pyrams and their allies.

== Distribution ==
This marine species occurs in the following locations:

- European waters (ERMS scope)
- Greek Exclusive Economic Zone
- Portuguese Exclusive Economic Zone
- Spanish Exclusive Economic Zone
