= Gustave Frédéric Dollfus =

French geologist and malacologist

Gustave Frédéric Dollfus (26 November 1850, Paris – 6 November 1931, Paris) was a French geologist and malacologist. He was the father of parasitologist Robert-Philippe Dollfus (1887–1976).

In 1868–70 he studied geology under Edmond Hébert at the Sorbonne, then continued his education in Lille as a pupil of Jules Gosselet. In 1879 he began work at the Service de la carte géologique de la France (Department of French geological cartography).

He was twice chosen as president of the Société de géologie de France (1896 and 1916). In 1923 he was awarded the Lyell Medal by the Geological Society of London.

His name is associated with several species of mollusk, an example being Chrysallida dollfusi, a sea snail described by Wilhelm Kobelt in 1903. The World Register of Marine Species lists 272 marine species named by Dollfus.

== Research ==
Among his various geological studies was analysis of the Cretaceous and Tertiary in the Cotentin Peninsula (mid-1870s). From his research of the Aquitanian stage, he published an important essay titled "Essai sur l'étage Aquitanien" (1909). With Philippe Dautzenberg, he was co-author of the voluminous "Conchyliologie du Miocéne moyen du Bassin de la Loire" (Conchology in regard to the Middle Miocene of the Loire basin). Other significant works by Dollfus include:

- Principes de géologie transformiste, application de la théorie de l'évolution à la géologie, 1874 - Principles of geological transformism, application of the theory of evolution to geology.
- Essai sur l'extension des terrains tertiaires dans le bassin anglo-parisien, 1880 - Essay on the extension of Tertiary terrain in the Anglo-Paris basin.
- Esquisse des terrains tertiaires de la Normandie, 1880 - Sketch involving the Tertiary terrain of Normandy.
- Descriptions de coquilles nouvelles des faluns de la Touraine, 1888 - Descriptions of new coquilles in the faluns of Touraine.
- Recherches géologiques sur les environs de Vichy (Allier), 1894 - Geological research on the environs of Vichy (Allier).
- Mollusques tertiaires du Portugal, 1909 - Terrestrial mollusks of Portugal.
