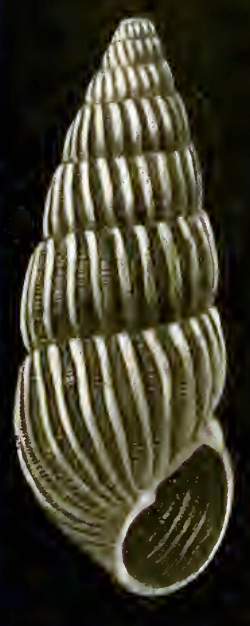
- Apertural view of a shell of Pyrgulina densecostata

Scientific classification
- Kingdom: Animalia
- Phylum: Mollusca
- Class: Gastropoda
- Subcohort: Panpulmonata
- Superfamily: Pyramidelloidea
- Family: Pyramidellidae
- Genus: Pyrgulina; A. Adams, 1864

Type species
- Chrysallida casta A. Adams, 1864

Synonyms
- Chrysallida (Pyrgulina) A. Adams, 1864; Contraxiala Laseron, 1956; Eupyrgulina Melvill, 1910; Odostomia (Pyrgulina) A. Adams, 1863; Parthenia (Pyrgulina) A. Adams, 1863; Pyrgulina (Pyrgulina) A. Adams, 1853; Pyrgulina (Standeniella) Saurin, 1958 · accepted, alternate representation; Standeniella Saurin, 1958

= Pyrgulina =

Genus of gastropods

Pyrgulina is a small genus of very small sea snails, pyramidellid gastropod mollusks or micromollusks. This genus is currently placed in the tribe Chrysallidini in the subfamily Odostomiinae of the family Odostomiidae.

== General description ==
The whorls of the teleoconch are sculptured similarly throughout. Varices are absent. The shell is marked with strong axial ribs which extend from the summit to the umbilical area The spiral markings consist of impressed lines. The fine, incised spiral striations are subequally spaced and present at the intercostal spaces between the sutures and on the base of the whorls.

== Species ==
Species within the genus Pyrgulina include:

- Pyrgulina adducta Peñas & Rolán, 2017
- Pyrgulina affinis Laseron, 1959
- Pyrgulina altiminima Peñas & Rolán, 2017
- Pyrgulina alveata (A. Adams, 1861)
- Pyrgulina alveatoides (Nomura, 1938)
- Pyrgulina amabilis Saurin, 1959
- Pyrgulina anacra Saurin, 1959
- Pyrgulina angustacostae Peñas & Rolán, 2017
- Pyrgulina anodyna Peñas & Rolán, 2017
- Pyrgulina archetypum Peñas & Rolán, 2017
- Pyrgulina arfica (Bartsch, 1915)
- Pyrgulina arguta Peñas & Rolán, 2017
- Pyrgulina bantama van Aartsen & Corgan, 1996
- Pyrgulina bertae Peñas & Rolán, 2017
- Pyrgulina bifariam Peñas & Rolán, 2017
- Pyrgulina brenda (A. Adams, 1860)
- Pyrgulina buriti Saurin, 1961
- Pyrgulina butoli Saurin, 1961
- Pyrgulina caledonica Peñas & Rolán, 2017
- Pyrgulina calendalis Saurin, 1959
- Pyrgulina cambodgiensis Saurin, 1961
- Pyrgulina canalicia Peñas & Rolán, 2017
- Pyrgulina carbonellae Peñas & Rolán, 2017
- Pyrgulina carmeloi Peñas, Rolán & Sabelli, 2020
- Pyrgulina casta (A. Adams, 1861)
- Pyrgulina cataplexis Peñas & Rolán, 2017
- Pyrgulina cheveyi Saurin, 1959
- Pyrgulina circumducta Peñas & Rolán, 2017
- Pyrgulina clatrorum Peñas & Rolán, 2017
- Pyrgulina collectitia Peñas & Rolán, 2017
- Pyrgulina colligata Peñas & Rolán, 2017
- Pyrgulina columna (Laseron, 1959)
- Pyrgulina comacum Melvill, 1910
- Pyrgulina conciliata Peñas & Rolán, 2017
- Pyrgulina concinna (A. Adams, 1860)
- Pyrgulina condensa Peñas & Rolán, 2017
- Pyrgulina condita Peñas, Rolán & Sabelli, 2020
- Pyrgulina congressa Peñas & Rolán, 2017
- Pyrgulina congruens Peñas & Rolán, 2017
- Pyrgulina consimilis (A. Adams, 1861)
- Pyrgulina consobrina (A. Adams, 1861)
- Pyrgulina corpuslevis Peñas & Rolán, 2017
- Pyrgulina cumstantes Peñas & Rolán, 2017
- Pyrgulina dactyliformis Peñas & Rolán, 2017
- Pyrgulina deambulans Peñas & Rolán, 2017
- Pyrgulina debiliformis Peñas & Rolán, 2017
- Pyrgulina decussata A. Adams, 1863
- Pyrgulina densecostata (Garrett, 1873)
- Pyrgulina diductacostae Peñas & Rolán, 2017
- Pyrgulina difficilis Saurin, 1958
- Pyrgulina diffidenter Peñas & Rolán, 2017
- Pyrgulina dilata Peñas & Rolán, 2017
- Pyrgulina dimidia Peñas & Rolán, 2017
- Pyrgulina dimidiata (Schander, 1994)
- Pyrgulina disposita Peñas & Rolán, 2017
- Pyrgulina dissensionis Peñas & Rolán, 2017
- Pyrgulina dissimiliter Peñas & Rolán, 2017
- Pyrgulina districta Peñas & Rolán, 2017
- Pyrgulina divulgata Peñas & Rolán, 2017
- Pyrgulina dominicae Saurin, 1959
- Pyrgulina dozouli Saurin, 1959
- Pyrgulina ductaspiralis Peñas & Rolán, 2017
- Pyrgulina durabilis van Aartsen & Corgan, 1996
- Pyrgulina eccrita Melvill, 1910
- Pyrgulina edana Melvill, 1910
- Pyrgulina elegantisformae Peñas & Rolán, 2017
- Pyrgulina epentromidea Melvill, 1899
- Pyrgulina epitoniformis Peñas & Rolán, 2017
- Pyrgulina erecta Peñas, Rolán & Sabelli, 2020
- Pyrgulina excellenter Peñas & Rolán, 2017
- Pyrgulina exceptionis Peñas & Rolán, 2017
- Pyrgulina exoleta Peñas & Rolán, 2017
- Pyrgulina fasciesfabae Peñas & Rolán, 2017
- Pyrgulina filocincta (A. Adams, 1863)
- Pyrgulina fischeri Hornung & Mermod, 1925
- Pyrgulina flexicostae Peñas & Rolán, 2017
- Pyrgulina formaviscala Peñas & Rolán, 2017
- Pyrgulina fusiformis Peñas & Rolán, 2017
- Pyrgulina granum Peñas & Rolán, 2017
- Pyrgulina grovesi Peñas & Rolán, 2017
- Pyrgulina hervierioides (Melvill, 1906)
- Pyrgulina honmungensis Saurin, 1959
- Pyrgulina interstriata (Souverbie, 1866)
- Pyrgulina isae Peñas, Rolán & Sabelli, 2020
- Pyrgulina jullieni Dautzenberg, 1912
- Pyrgulina kampotensis Saurin, 1961
- Pyrgulina kempermani (van Aartsen, Gittenberger & Goud, 2000)
- Pyrgulina kepensis Saurin, 1962
- Pyrgulina krempfi Saurin, 1959
- Pyrgulina lacrima Peñas, Rolán & Sabelli, 2020
- Pyrgulina lafollettei Peñas & Rolán, 2017
- Pyrgulina lagoenae Peñas & Rolán, 2017
- Pyrgulina lagrandierei Saurin, 1959
- † Pyrgulina latocorrugata Laws, 1941
- Pyrgulina lecta (Dall & Bartsch, 1906)
- Pyrgulina levamisii Saurin, 1959
- Pyrgulina lineotuber Peñas, Rolán & Sabelli, 2020
- Pyrgulina linomicalii Peñas, Rolán & Sabelli, 2020
- Pyrgulina maiae Hornung & Mermod, 1924
- Pyrgulina melvilli Dautzenberg & Fischer, 1906
- Pyrgulina microstriata Peñas & Rolán, 2017
- Pyrgulina microtuber Peñas, Rolán & Sabelli, 2020
- Pyrgulina milicha Melvill, 1910
- Pyrgulina minimalicii Peñas & Rolán, 2017
- Pyrgulina minimelata Peñas & Rolán, 2017
- Pyrgulina miniovalis Peñas & Rolán, 2017
- Pyrgulina minuscoronata Peñas & Rolán, 2017
- Pyrgulina minusgranum Peñas, Rolán & Sabelli, 2020
- Pyrgulina minuta Feng, 1996
- Pyrgulina multinodosa Peñas & Rolán, 2017
- Pyrgulina mundula (A. Adams, 1861)
- Pyrgulina nana Hornung & Mermod, 1924
- Pyrgulina nisitugaruensis (Nomura & Hatai, 1940)
- Pyrgulina noviportus Saurin, 1961
- Pyrgulina obesa Dautzenberg, 1912
- Pyrgulina obliqua (Laseron, 1956)
- Pyrgulina oodes (Watson, 1886)
- Pyrgulina opimasculpta Peñas & Rolán, 2017
- Pyrgulina ovumformis (Nomura, 1938)
- Pyrgulina partimcostae Peñas & Rolán, 2017
- Pyrgulina perdiminuta Peñas & Rolán, 2017
- Pyrgulina permanens Peñas, Rolán & Sabelli, 2020
- Pyrgulina permansa Peñas, Rolán & Sabelli, 2020
- Pyrgulina perscalata (Hedley, 1909)
- Pyrgulina philippinensis Peñas & Rolán, 2017
- Pyrgulina phohaiensis Saurin, 1958
- Pyrgulina pinguis (Peñas & Rolán, 1998)
- Pyrgulina pirinthella Melvill, 1910
- Pyrgulina plicata (A. Adams, 1860)
- Pyrgulina pluricircumversa Peñas & Rolán, 2017
- Pyrgulina problema Peñas & Rolán, 2017
- Pyrgulina pronacostae Peñas & Rolán, 2017
- Pyrgulina propepuncti Peñas & Rolán, 2017
- Pyrgulina prosoribs Peñas, Rolán & Sabelli, 2020
- Pyrgulina proximitatis Peñas & Rolán, 2017
- Pyrgulina pseudalveata (Nomura, 1936)
- Pyrgulina pulchella (A. Adams, 1860)
- Pyrgulina pupaeformis (Souverbie, 1865)
- Pyrgulina pupula (A. Adams, 1861)
- Pyrgulina pura (A. Adams, 1861)
- Pyrgulina puriae Peñas & Rolán, 2017
- Pyrgulina pyrgomella (Melvill, 1896)
- Pyrgulina quasicylindrica Peñas & Rolán, 2017
- Pyrgulina quinqueflexaPeñas, Rolán & Sabelli, 2020
- Pyrgulina raricostae Peñas & Rolán, 2017
- Pyrgulina rectangularis Peñas & Rolán, 2017
- Pyrgulina redempta (Melvill, 1910)
- Pyrgulina reekmansae Peñas, Rolán & Swinnen, 2014
- Pyrgulina robustissima Peñas & Rolán, 2017
- Pyrgulina rudicostae Peñas & Rolán, 2017
- Pyrgulina santaisabelensis Peñas & Rolán, 2017
- Pyrgulina satistriata Peñas & Rolán, 2017
- Pyrgulina scabra Peñas, Rolán & Sabelli, 2020
- Pyrgulina scapulata Peñas & Rolán, 2017
- Pyrgulina scripta van Aartsen & Corgan, 1996
- Pyrgulina shigeyasui (Yokoyama, 1927)
- Pyrgulina simokitana (Nomura, 1939)
- Pyrgulina sowerbyi van Aartsen & Corgan, 1996
- Pyrgulina spifunifortis Peñas & Rolán, 2017
- Pyrgulina spissa Laseron, 1959
- Pyrgulina standeni Dautzenberg & Fischer, 1906
- Pyrgulina sykesi Dautzenberg & Fischer, 1906
- Pyrgulina taravaensis Peñas & Rolán, 2017
- Pyrgulina tenerrima (Melvill, 1907)
- Pyrgulina textilisculpta Peñas & Rolán, 2017
- Pyrgulina thelxinoa (Melvill, 1906)
- Pyrgulina tongaensis Peñas & Rolán, 2017
- Pyrgulina traiecta Peñas & Rolán, 2017
- Pyrgulina trochiformis Saurin, 1959
- Pyrgulina tutubaensis Peñas & Rolán, 2017
- Pyrgulina vanderlindeni (van Aartsen, Gittenberger & Goud, 2000)
- Pyrgulina vanvelthoveni Peñas, Rolán & Swinnen, 2014
- Pyrgulina ventricosa Hornung & Mermod, 1924
- Pyrgulina venuste Peñas & Rolán, 2017
- Pyrgulina verticalis Peñas & Rolán, 2017
- Pyrgulina whitechurchi (W.H. Turton, 1932)
- Pyrgulina yersini Saurin, 1959
- Pyrgulina zidora Melvill, 1910

Species brought into synonymy

- Pyrgulina abbreviata Monterosato, 1884: synonym of Turbonilla amoena (Monterosato, 1878)
- Pyrgulina angulosa Monterosato, 1889: synonym of Parthenina angulosa (Monterosato, 1889)
- Pyrgulina approximans Dautzenberg, 1912: synonym of Kongsrudia approximans (Dautzenberg, 1912)
- Pyrgulina bavayi Dautzenberg, 1912: synonym of Kongsrudia gruveli (Dautzenberg, 1910)
- Pyrgulina bartschi Dautzenberg & Fischer, 1906: synonym of Egilina callista (Melvill, 1893)
- Pyrgulina bavayi Dautzenberg, 1912: synonym of Kongsrudia gruveli (Dautzenberg, 1910)
- Pyrgulina brevicula Monterosato, 1884: synonym of Chrysallida monterosatii (Clessin, 1900): synonym of Parthenina monterosatii (Clessin, 1900)
- Pyrgulina brusinai Cossmann, 1921: synonym of Chrysallida incerta (Milaschewitsch, 1916)
- Pyrgulina callista Mevill, 1893: synonym of Egilina callista (Melvill, 1893)
- Pyrgulina claudoni Dautzenberg & Fischer, 1906: synonym of Numaegilina claudoni (Dautzenberg & Fischer, 1906)
- Pyrgulina connexa Dautzenberg, 1912: synonym of Chrysallida connexa (Dautzenberg, 1912)
- Pyrgulina cossmanni Hornung & Mermod, 1924: synonym of Besla cossmanni (Hornung & Mermod, 1924)
- Pyrgulina costulata (Dunker, 1860): synonym of Pyrgulina pupaeformis (Souverbie, 1865)
- Pyrgulina crystallopecta Melvill, 1910: synonym of Pyrgiscus crystallopectus (Melvill, 1910)
- Pyrgulina dautzenbergi Melvill, 1910: synonym of Polemicella dautzenbergi (Melvill, 1910) (original combination)
- Pyrgulina decorata (Philippi, 1849): synonym of Chrysallida decorata (Philippi, 1849)
- Pyrgulina denticula Coen, 1933: synonym of Chrysallida terebellum (Philippi, 1844): synonym of Parthenina terebellum (Philippi, 1844)
- Pyrgulina edgarii Melvill, 1896: synonym of Turbonilla edgarii (Melvill, 1896))
- Pyrgulina epentroma (Melvill, 1896)): synonym of Costabieta epentroma (Melvill, 1896))
- Pyrgulina fannyae Saurin, 1959: synonym of Linopyrga fannyae (Saurin, 1959)
- Pyrgulina feriarum Saurin, 1959: synonym of Linopyrga feriarum (Saurin, 1959)
- Pyrgulina gemmifera Dautzenberg & H. Fischer, 1906: synonym of Liamorpha gemmifera (Dautzenberg & H. Fischer, 1906)
- Pyrgulina germaini Dautzenberg & Fischer, 1906: synonym of Odostomella germaini (Dautzenberg & Fischer, 1906)
- Pyrgulina germaini Dautzenberg, 1912: synonym of Pyrgulina substituta Dautzenberg, 1913
- Pyrgulina givenchyi Dautzenberg, 1912: synonym of Chrysallida jullieni (Dautzenberg, 1912)
- Pyrgulina gliriella Melvill & Standen, 1896: synonym of Herviera gliriella (Melvill & Standen, 1896)
- Pyrgulina humilis (Preston, 1905): synonym of Quirella humilis (Preston, 1905)
- Pyrgulina indistincta (Montagu, 1808): synonym of Parthenina indistincta (Montagu, 1808)
- Pyrgulina infrasulcata Dautzenberg, 1912: synonym of Odetta sulcata (de Folin, 1870)
- Pyrgulina lamyi Dautzenberg, 1912 : synonym of Pyrgulina mutata Dautzenberg, 1912
- Pyrgulina lamyi Dautzenberg & Fischer, 1906: synonym of Egilina lamyi (Dautzenberg & Fischer, 1906)
- Pyrgulina manorae (Melvill, 1898): synonym of Turbonilla manorae Melvill, 1898: synonym of Turbonilla mumia (A. Adams, 1861)
- Pyrgulina monicae Saurin, 1958: synonym of Parthenina monicae (Saurin, 1958)
- Pyrgulina montbruni Saurin, 1959: synonym of Pyrgulina pupaeformis (Souverbie, 1865) (doubyful synonym)
- Pyrgulina muinamensis Saurin, 1959: synonym of Pyrgulina pupaeformis (Souverbie, 1865)
- Pyrgulina mutata Dautzenberg, 1912: synonym of Kongsrudia mutata (Dautzenberg, 1912)
- Pyrgulina nigraerupis Saurin, 1959 : synonym of Pyrgulina tenerrima (Melvill, 1906)
- Pyrgulina perscalata (Hedley, 1909): synonym of Linopyrga perscalata (Hedley, 1909)
- Pyrgulina perspectiva Hedley, 1902: synonym of Egilina callista (Melvill, 1893)
- Pyrgulina polemica Melvill, 1910: synonym of Polemicella polemica (Melvill, 1910)
- Pyrgulina prestoni Dautzenberg & Fischer, 1906: synonym of Egilina prestoni (Dautzenberg & Fischer, 1906)
- Pyrgulina pretiosa Dautzenberg & Fischer, 1906: synonym of Miralda pretiosa (Dautzenberg & Fischer, 1906)
- Pyrgulina pretiosa (Turton, 1932): synonym of Pyrgulina sowerbyi van Aartsen & Corgan, 1996 (secondary junior homonym of Pyrgulina pretiosa Dautzenberg & Fischer, 1907; Pyrgulina sowerbyi is a replacement name.)
- Pyrgulina primitractus Saurin, 1959: synonym of Linopyrga primitractus (Saurin, 1959)
- Pyrgulina pura Saurin, 1961: synonym of Chrysallida pura (Saurin, 1962)
- Pyrgulina pygmaea Thiele, 1925: synonym of Pyrgulina bantama van Aartsen & Corgan, 1996
- Pyrgulina sculptatissima Dautzenberg, 1912: synonym of Miralda elegans (de Folin, 1870): synonym of Liamorpha elegans (de Folin, 1870)
- Pyrgulina sinus Saurin, 1959: synonym of Linopyrga sinus (Saurin, 1959)
- Pyrgulina senex Hedley, 1902: synonym of Miralda senex (Hedley, 1902) (original combination)
- Pyrgulina sowerbyi van Aartsen & Corgan, 1996: synonym of Pyrgulina pretiosa (Turton, 1932)
