= B. cylindrica =

B. cylindrica may refer to:

- Babella cylindrica, a sea snail species
- Bicosoeca cylindrica, a species of bicosoecids in genus Bicosoeca
- Boehmeria cylindrica, a flowering plant species
- Brephulopsis cylindrica, a land snail species
- Bruguiera cylindrica, a mangrove species
- Bythinella cylindrica, a snail species
