= Egilina =

Scientific classification
- Kingdom: Animalia
- Phylum: Mollusca
- Class: Gastropoda
- Family: Pyramidellidae
- Tribe: Chrysallidini
- Genus: Egilina; Dall & Bartsch, 1906

Synonyms
- Egilina (Egilina) Dall & Bartsch, 1906; Egilina (Prestoniella) Saurin, 1958; Miraldella Bartsch, 1955; Pyrgulina (Egilina) Dall & Bartsch, 1906

Genus of gastropods

Egilina is a genus of sea snails, marine gastropod mollusks in the family Pyramidellidae, the pyrams and their allies.

== Description ==
Species in this genus have strong axial ribs between the sutures which are interrupted at the periphery by a deep spiral sulcus. The intercostal spaces are smooth. The base of the shell is ornamented by spiral keels, the spaces between which are marked by many very slender axial threads.

== Species ==
Species within the genus Egilina include:

- Egilina alicae (Hornung & Mermod, 1924)
- Egilina babellina Saurin, 1958
- Egilina callista (Melvill, 1893)
- Egilina chasteriana (Melvill, 1910)
- Egilina gigantea Saurin, 1958
- Egilina glycisma (Melvill, 1899)
- Egilina gracilis (Yokoyama, 1926)
- Egilina kotoeae Hori & Fukuda, 1999
- Egilina lamyi (Dautzenberg & Fischer, 1907)
- Egilina mariella (A.Adams, 1860)
- Egilina mariellaeformis (Nomura, 1938)
- Egilina prestoni (Dautzenberg & Fischer, 1907)
- Egilina tenuis Saurin, 1962

Synonyms

- Egilina yabei Nomura, 1936: synonym of Babella yabei (Nomura, 1936)
