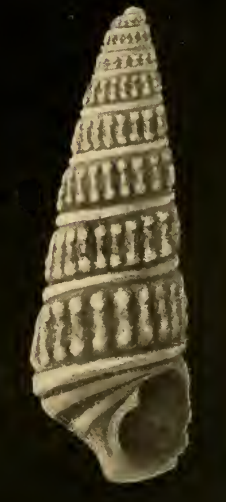
- Apertural view of a shell of Babella caelatior

Scientific classification
- Kingdom: Animalia
- Phylum: Mollusca
- Class: Gastropoda
- Subcohort: Panpulmonata
- Superfamily: Pyramidelloidea
- Family: Pyramidellidae
- Genus: Babella; Dall & Bartsch, 1906

Type species
- Turbonilla (Babella) caelatior Dall & Bartsch, 1906

Synonyms
- Chrysallida (Numaegilina) Nomura, 1938; Egilina (Numaegilina) Nomura, 1938; Numaegilina Nomura, 1938; Paregila Laseron, 1951; Turbonilla (Babella) Dall & Bartsch, 1906 (original rank)

= Babella =

Genus of gastropods

Babella is a genus of very small sea snails, pyramidellid gastropod mollusks or micromollusks in the family Pyramidellidae within the tribe Chrysallidini (sensu taxonomy by Bouchet & Roctroi, 2005).

== General characteristics ==
The shell shows strong axial ribs between the sutures and three spiral keels, two of which are at the periphery, which falls in the deep sulcus between them, and one a little anterior to the middle of the base.

The genus Babella includes species with a solid shell, regular conical profile, axial sculpture formed by robust and very oblique ribs, interrupted by a thick spiral cord which runs above the suture determines a deep groove on the periphery of the body whorl, a spiral microsculpture may exist in the interspaces and on the base. The aperture has a strong, pointed columellar tooth.

== Distribution ==
The genus seems to be limited to tropical and temperate regions of the Pacific Ocean.

== Life habits ==
Little is known about the biology of the members of this genus. As is true of most members of the Pyramidellidae sensu lato, they are ectoparasites.

== Species ==
There are twelve known species within the genus Babella, these include:

- Babella caelatior (Dall & Bartsch, 1906) - synonym: Babella caelata (A. Adams, 1864)
- Babella caledonica Peñas & Rolán, 2017
- Babella ceciriana (Saurin, 1958)
- Babella claudoni (Dautzenberg & H. Fischer, 1907)
- Babella crassicostata (Saurin, 1958)
- Babella cylindrica (Saurin, 1958)
- Babella funiculata (Saurin, 1961)
- Babella gloria (Nomura, S., 1938)
- Babella glycisma (Melvill, 1899)
- Babella hastula (Saurin, 1961)
- Babella henni (Brazier, 1894)
- Babella khmeriana (Saurin, 1962)
- Babella maestratii Peñas, Rolán & Sabelli, 2020
- Babella mariellaeformis (Nomura, 1938)
- Babella micronodulosa Peñas, Rolán & Sabelli, 2020
- Babella nimiaprocostae Peñas, Rolán & Sabelli, 2020
- Babella obliquissima (Saurin, 1959)
- Babella ovalis Peñas, Rolán & Sabelli, 2020
- Babella pallida Peñas & Rolán, 2017
- Babella palmarium Poppe, 2025
- Babella planispiralis Peñas & Rolán, 2017
- Babella prominens Peñas & Rolán, 2017
- Babella ventricosa (Saurin, 1958)
- Babella yabei yabei Nomura 1936
  - Babella yabei perarellia Nomura 1938

Species brought into synonymy

- Babella affectuosa (Yokoyama, 1927): synonym of Parthenina affectuosa (Yokoyama, 1927)
- Babella bartschi (Dautzenberg & Fischer, 1906): synonym of Egilina callista (Melvill, 1893)
- Babella caelata (A. Adams, 1863): synonym of Babella caelatior (Dall & Bartsch, 1906)
