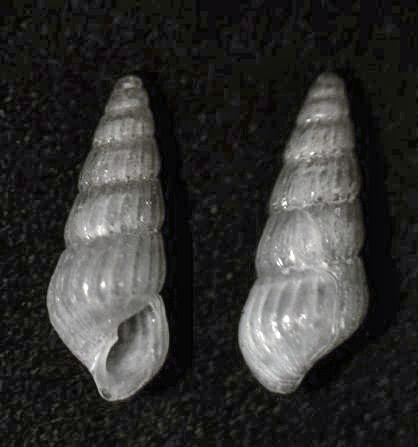
- Two shells of Parthenina terebellum

Scientific classification
- Kingdom: Animalia
- Phylum: Mollusca
- Class: Gastropoda
- Subcohort: Panpulmonata
- Superfamily: Pyramidelloidea
- Family: Pyramidellidae
- Genus: Parthenina; Bucquoy, Dautzenberg & Dollfus, 1883

Synonyms
- Chrysallida (Parthenina) Bucquoy, Dautzenberg & Dollfus, 1883; Egilina (Prestoniella) Saurin, 1958; Elodia de Folin, 1870; Elodiamea de Folin, 1886; Odostomia (Parthenina) Bucquoy, Dautzenberg & Dollfus, 1883; Pselliogyra Dall & Bartsch, 1909; Pyrgulina (Parthenina) Bucquoy, Dautzenberg & Dollfus, 1883; Tiberia (Tiberiella) Coen, 1933; Tiberiella Coen, 1933; Turbonilla (Pselliogyra) Bucquoy, Dautzenberg & Dollfus, 1883 (superseded combination)

= Parthenina =

Genus of gastropods

Parthenina is a genus of very small sea snails, pyramidellid gastropod mollusks or micromollusks.

This genus was previously placed in the subfamily Chrysallidinae of the family Odostomiidae. The name Parthenia was created by Lowe in 1840 for the species in this group, but had to be replaced since it was preoccupied by a name for a group of dipterans described by Roubineau-Desvoidy in 1830.

== Shell description ==
In the original description Bucquoy, Dautzenberg & Dollfus (1833) states (in English translation) that Partnenina is a type of Odostomia with a mesh-like surface or with longitudinal ridges. Between these ridges there are series of spiral ridges. Many of the European species in the genus have for a long time been wrongly placed in the genus Chrysallida, but Schander et al. (2003) showed that they should indeed be placed in the genus Parthenina. This separation was followed by Pimenta et al. (2009) for Brazilian species.

The synonymy with Besla Dall & Bartsch, 1904 proposed by Micali et al. (2012) is debatable. The type species of Besla has a protoconch axis at 90° with that of teleoconch ("type A protoconch") whereas that of Parthenina is tilted nearly 180° ("type C"); this important character suggests that they are unrelated and that their teleoconch sculpture may be convergent

== Taxonomy ==
The Eastern Atlantic and Mediterranean species of the family Pyramidellidae, here listed under the genus Parthenina Bucquoy, Dautzenberg & Dollfus, 1883, have been included by most 20th-century European authors in the genus Chrysallida Carpenter, 1856, following a lead by Winckworth (1932). The first explicit statement that this is incorrect was voiced by van Aartsen, Gittenberger & Goud (2000: 21) "None of the many species from European Atlantic and Mediterranean waters currently included in Chrysallida conforms exactly to the description of the genus sensu stricto", but they still used Chrysallida as a genus and used Parthenina and other names as subgenera. Micali, Nofroni & Perna (2012) formally raised Parthenina to the rank of genus and included a number of European species, whereas other congeners not treated in that paper were still listed in WoRMS and elsewhere as Chrysallida. Hoisaeter (2014) transferred some more species but still listed five species under Chrysallida. The current treatment follows Giannuzzi-Savelli, Pusateri, Micali, Nofroni & Bartolini (2014) who provided a quite sensible treatment and transferred the relevant Mediterranean species to Parthenina and other genera, without any species retained in Chrysallida. This scheme yet has to be tested against a phylogenetic hypothesis based on molecular sequence data.

== Life history ==
The genus is parasitic, manly on serpulid polychaete worms. They are known to have spermatophores.

== Species ==
Species within the genus Parthenina include:

- † Parthenina acuticostata (Sorgenfrei, 1958)
- Parthenina aemulatrix Peñas & Rolán, 2017
- Parthenina affectuosa (Yokoyama, 1927)
- Parthenina alesii Micali, Nofroni & Perna, 2012
- Parthenina altecara Peñas & Rolán, 2017
- Parthenina altinodosa Peñas & Rolán, 2017
- Parthenina altumincile Peñas & Rolán, 2017
- Parthenina angulosa (Monterosato, 1889)
- Parthenina anselmoi (Peñas & Rolán, 1998)
- Parthenina artiumbilici Peñas & Rolán, 2017
- Parthenina assimilis Peñas & Rolán, 2017
- Parthenina basicostata Peñas & Rolán, 2017
- Parthenina basisfuniculata Peñas & Rolán, 2017
- Parthenina biumbilicata Pimenta, 2012
- Parthenina brattstroemi (Warén, 1991)
- Parthenina breviter Peñas & Rolán, 2017
- Parthenina canalesi Peñas & Rolán, 2017
- Parthenina captiosa Peñas & Rolán, 2017
- Parthenina circumsepta Peñas & Rolán, 2017
- Parthenina clathrata (Jeffreys, 1848)
- Parthenina columnalis Peñas & Rolán, 2017
- Parthenina congesta Peñas & Rolán, 2017
- Parthenina conjugata Peñas & Rolán, 2017
- Parthenina connexa (Dautzenberg, 1912)
- Parthenina considerata Peñas & Rolán, 2017
- Parthenina convoluta Peñas, Rolán & Sabelli, 2020
- Parthenina copiosa Peñas & Rolán, 2017
- Parthenina correcta Peñas & Rolán, 2017
- Parthenina curvicostae Peñas & Rolán, 2017
- Parthenina dantarti (Peñas & Rolán, 2008)
- Parthenina decussata (Montagu, 1803)
- Parthenina dekkeri (van Aartsen, Gittenberger & Goud, 2000)
- Parthenina delectabilis Peñas & Rolán, 2017
- Parthenina deminuta Peñas & Rolán, 2017
- Parthenina densesculpta Peñas & Rolán, 2017
- Parthenina digitiformis Peñas & Rolán, 2017
- Parthenina discursa Peñas & Rolán, 2017
- Parthenina dissensa Peñas & Rolán, 2017
- Parthenina dollfusi (Kobelt, 1903)
- Parthenina elegantiae Peñas, Rolán & Sabelli, 2020
- Parthenina emaciata (Brusina, 1866)
- Parthenina excessa Peñas & Rolán, 2017
- Parthenina eximia (Jeffreys, 1849)
- Parthenina expressa Peñas & Rolán, 2017
- Parthenina extenta Peñas & Rolán, 2017
- Parthenina faberi (van Aartsen, Gittenberger & Goud, 2000)
- Parthenina feldi (van Aartsen, Gittenberger & Goud, 2000)
- Parthenina flexuosa (Monterosato, 1874)
- Parthenina gabmulderi (van Aartsen, Gittenberger & Goud, 2000)
- Parthenina indistincta (Montagu, 1908)
- Parthenina intermissa (Thiele, 1925)
- Parthenina interspatiosa (Linden & Eikenboom, 1992)
- Parthenina interstincta (Montagu, 1803) - type species, as Turbo interstinctus
- Parthenina inverta (Laseron, 1959)
- Parthenina iuga (Laseron, 1959)
- Parthenina jeanpaulkrepsi Peñas, Rolán & Swinnen, 2014
- Parthenina josae (van Aartsen, Gittenberger & Goud, 2000)
- Parthenina juliae (de Folin, 1872)
- Parthenina limitum (Brusina in de Folin & Périer, 1876)
- Parthenina marielloides (Yokoyama, 1922)
- Parthenina marquesensis Peñas & Rolán, 2017
- † Parthenina martae Landau & LaFollette, 2015
- Parthenina mauritanica (Peñas & Rolán, 1998)
- Parthenina meta (Dall & Bartsch, 1906)
- Parthenina microsculpta Peñas & Rolán, 2017
- Parthenina monicae (Saurin, 1958)
- Parthenina monozona (Brusina, 1869)
- Parthenina monterosatii (Clessin, 1900)
- Parthenina moolenbeeki (Amati, 1987)
- Parthenina multicostata (Jeffreys, 1884)
- Parthenina nexa Peñas, Rolán & Sabelli, 2020
- Parthenina nullusdens Peñas & Rolán, 2017
- Parthenina opisthecostae Peñas & Rolán, 2017
- Parthenina orientalis (Nomura, 1936)
- Parthenina pagodula (A. Adams, 1860)
- Parthenina palazzii (Micali, 1984)
- Parthenina parasigmoidea (Schander, 1994)
- Parthenina parvispiralis Peñas & Rolán, 2017
- Parthenina penchynati (Bucquoy, Dautzenberg & Dollfus, 1883)
- Parthenina perfilumserrae Peñas & Rolán, 2017
- Parthenina perforata Peñas, Rolán & Sabelli, 2020
- Parthenina perpetua Peñas, Rolán & Sabelli, 2020
- Parthenina pluracostae Peñas & Rolán, 2017
- Parthenina pluricostulata Peñas & Rolán, 2017
- Parthenina plurifuniculata Peñas & Rolán, 2017
- Parthenina pseudofolinella Peñas & Rolán, 2017
- Parthenina pyttelilla (Schander, 1994)
- Parthenina quantoana (Nomura, 1937)
- Parthenina rinaldii (Micali & Nofroni, 2004)
- Parthenina rudisculpta Peñas & Rolán, 2017
- Parthenina sagamiana (Yokoyama, 1922)
- Parthenina sarsi (Nordsieck, 1972)
- Parthenina scalarum Peñas & Rolán, 2017
- Parthenina sergei (Nofroni & Schander, 1994)
- Parthenina shibana (Yokoyama, 1927)
- Parthenina solomonensis Peñas & Rolán, 2017
- Parthenina spiculiformae Peñas & Rolán, 2017
- Parthenina sudanensis Peñas, Rolán & Sabelli, 2020
- Parthenina suturalis (Philippi, 1844)
- Parthenina tavianii Peñas, Rolán & Sabelli, 2020
- Parthenina tenuifuniculata Peñas & Rolán, 2017
- Parthenina terebellum (Philippi, 1844)
- Parthenina trialicii Peñas & Rolán, 2017
- Parthenina typica (Laseron, 1959)
- Parthenina ultralaeta (Nomura, 1936)
- Parthenina unavera Peñas, Rolán & Sabelli, 2020
- Parthenina vanuatuensis Peñas & Rolán, 2017
- Parthenina varia (Odé, 1993)
- Parthenina ventriosa Peñas & Rolán, 2017
- Parthenina vitilevuensis Peñas & Rolán, 2017
- Parthenina wikanderi Høisaeter, 2014
- Parthenina willeminae (van Aartsen, Gittenberger & Goud, 2000)

Species brought into synonymy

- Parthenina atlantica Locard, 1897: synonym of Turbonilla atlantica (Locard, 1897)
- Parthenina bucquoyi Locard, 1886: synonym of Odostomella doliolum (Philippi, 1844)
- Parthenina caduca (Laseron, 1959): synonym of Elodiamea caduca Laseron, 1959
- Parthenina desmoulinsiana Locard, 1886: synonym of Chrysallida terebellum (Philippi, 1844): synonym of
- Parthenina flexicosta Locard, 1886: synonym of Parthenina interstincta (J. Adams, 1797)
- Parthenina gracilis (Yokoyama, 1926): synonym of Egilina gracilis (Yokoyama, 1926)
- Parthenina incerta Milaschewitsch, 1916: synonym of Spiralinella incerta (Milaschewich, 1916)
- Parthenina monocycla (Yokoyama, 1922): synonym of Parthenina pagodula (A. Adams, 1860)
- Parthenina multicostata (Laseron, 1959): synonym of Elodiamea multicostata Laseron, 1959
- Parthenina ora (Laseron, 1959): synonym of Elodiamea ora Laseron, 1959
- Parthenina proiectura (Laseron, 1959): synonym of Elodiamea proiectura Laseron, 1959
- Parthenina tenuistriata Milaschewitsch, 1909: synonym of Parthenina juliae (de Folin, 1872)
