= Pyrgulina maiae =

Scientific classification
- Kingdom: Animalia
- Phylum: Mollusca
- Class: Gastropoda
- Family: Pyramidellidae
- Genus: Pyrgulina
- Species: P. maiae

Binomial name
- Pyrgulina maiae Hornung & Mermod, 1924

Synonyms
- Chrysallida maiae (Hornung & Mermod, 1924); Dunkeria scalaris dentata Nordsieck, 1972; Turbonilla (Dunkeria) scalaris dentata (Nordsieck, 1972)

Species of gastropod

Pyrgulina maiae is a species of sea snail, a marine gastropod mollusk in the family Pyramidellidae, the pyrams and their allies.

== Distribution ==
This marine species occurs in the following locations:

- European waters (ERMS scope)
- Mediterranean Sea
- Mersin Bay
