= Babella planispiralis =

- Shell of Babella planispiralis (holotype at MNHN, Paris)

Scientific classification
- Kingdom: Animalia
- Phylum: Mollusca
- Class: Gastropoda
- Family: Pyramidellidae
- Genus: Babella
- Species: B. planispiralis

Binomial name
- Babella planispiralis Peñas & Rolán, 2017

Species of gastropod

Babella planispiralis is a species of sea snail, a marine gastropod mollusk in the family Pyramidellidae, the pyrams and their allies. The species is one of twelve in the gastropod genus Babella.

== Distribution ==
This marine species occurs in French Polynesia.
