= Parthenina dantarti =

Scientific classification
- Kingdom: Animalia
- Phylum: Mollusca
- Class: Gastropoda
- Family: Pyramidellidae
- Genus: Parthenina
- Species: P. dantarti

Binomial name
- Parthenina dantarti (Peñas & Rolán, 2008)

Synonyms
- Chrysallida dantarti Peñas & Rolán, 2008

Species of gastropod

Parthenina dantarti is a species of sea snail, a marine gastropod mollusk in the family Pyramidellidae, the pyrams and their allies.
