= Babella hastula =

Scientific classification
- Kingdom: Animalia
- Phylum: Mollusca
- Class: Gastropoda
- Family: Pyramidellidae
- Genus: Babella
- Species: B. hastula

Binomial name
- Babella hastula Saurin, 1962

Synonyms
- Chrysallida (Babella) hastula Saurin, 1961

Species of gastropod

Babella hastula is a species of sea snail, a marine gastropod mollusk in the family Pyramidellidae, the pyrams and their allies.

== Distribution ==
This marine species occurs off the coasts of Vietnam and the Gulf of Thailand.
