= Parthenina alesii =

Scientific classification
- Kingdom: Animalia
- Phylum: Mollusca
- Class: Gastropoda
- Family: Pyramidellidae
- Genus: Parthenina
- Species: P. alesii

Binomial name
- Parthenina alesii Micali, Nofroni & Perna, 2012

Species of gastropod

Parthenina alesii is a species of sea snail, a marine gastropod mollusk in the family Pyramidellidae, the pyrams and their allies.
