= Babella funiculata =

- Shell of Babella funiculata (syntype at MNHN, Paris)

Scientific classification
- Kingdom: Animalia
- Phylum: Mollusca
- Class: Gastropoda
- Family: Pyramidellidae
- Genus: Babella
- Species: B. funiculata

Binomial name
- Babella funiculata Saurin, 1962

Synonyms
- Chrysallida (Babella) funiculata (Saurin, 1961)

Species of gastropod

Babella funiculata is a species of sea snail, a marine gastropod mollusk in the family Pyramidellidae, the pyrams and their allies. The species is one of twelve known species within the Babella genus of gastropods.

== Distribution ==
This marine species occurs off the southern coasts of Cambodia and the Gulf of Thailand, southeast Asia.
