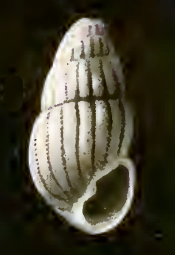
- Apertural view of a shell of Pyrgulina alveata

Scientific classification
- Kingdom: Animalia
- Phylum: Mollusca
- Class: Gastropoda
- Family: Pyramidellidae
- Genus: Pyrgulina
- Species: P. alveata

Binomial name
- Pyrgulina alveata (A. Adams, 1861)

Synonyms
- Chrysallida alveata A. Adams, 1861 (basionym); Odostomia (Pyrgulina) alveata (A. Adams, 1861) (basionym)

= Pyrgulina alveata =

Species of gastropod

Pyrgulina alveata is a species of very small sea snail, a pyramidellid gastropod micromollusk. This genus is currently placed in the subfamily Chrysallidinae of the family Pyramidellidae.

== Description ==
The small shell measures 2 mm. It is oblong, ovate, milk-white. The nuclear whorls are decollated. The five post-nuclear whorls are rather high between the sutures, moderately rounded, strongly shouldered at the summit, which is subtabulated. They are crossed by strong, rounded, almost vertical axial ribs, which render the summit of the whorls crenulate. Eighteen of these ribs occur upon the third, and nineteen upon the penultimate whorl. The intercostal spaces are about one-half as wide as the ribs, crossed by about twelve fine, subequally spaced, incised spiral lines. The summits of succeeding whorls fall a little anterior to the somewhat angulated periphery of the preceding whorl on the earlier volutions, and gives them a somewhat constricted appearance at the deep sutures. The periphery of the body whorl is very faintly angulated. The base of the shell is well rounded, somewhat pinched at the umbilical region. It is marked by the strong continuations of the axial ribs, and about ten spirally incised lines in the spaces between them. The aperture is oval. The posterior angle is obtuse. The outer lip is thick showing seven equally well-developed and equally spaced internal lirations. The columella is short, decidedly curved and revolute, with a strong oblique fold at its insertion. The parietal wall is covered by a thin callus.

== Distribution ==
This species occurs in the Pacific Ocean off Japan.
