= Babella obliquissima =

- Shell of Babella obliquissima (syntype at MNHN, Paris)

Scientific classification
- Kingdom: Animalia
- Phylum: Mollusca
- Class: Gastropoda
- Family: Pyramidellidae
- Genus: Babella
- Species: B. obliquissima

Binomial name
- Babella obliquissima (Saurin, 1959)

Synonyms
- Numaegilina obliquissima Saurin, 1959 (original combination)

Species of gastropod

Babella obliquissima is a species of sea snail, a marine gastropod mollusk in the family Pyramidellidae, the pyrams and their allies.

== Distribution ==
This marine species occurs off Vietnam.
