= Babella pallida =

- Shell of Babella pallida (holotype at MNHN, Paris)

Scientific classification
- Kingdom: Animalia
- Phylum: Mollusca
- Class: Gastropoda
- Family: Pyramidellidae
- Genus: Babella
- Species: B. pallida

Binomial name
- Babella pallida Peñas & Rolán, 2017

Species of gastropod

Babella pallida is a species of sea snail, a marine gastropod mollusk in the family Pyramidellidae, the pyrams and their allies. The species is one of twelve in the gastropod genus Babella.

== Distribution ==
This marine species occurs off Vanuatu.
