= Pyrgulina obliqua =

Scientific classification
- Kingdom: Animalia
- Phylum: Mollusca
- Class: Gastropoda
- Family: Pyramidellidae
- Genus: Pyrgulina
- Species: P. obliqua

Binomial name
- Pyrgulina obliqua (Laseron, 1956)

Synonyms
- Contraxiala obliqua Laseron, 1956

Species of gastropod

Pyrgulina obliqua is a species of sea snail, a marine gastropod mollusk in the family Pyramidellidae, the pyrams and their allies. This species occurs in the Great Barrier Reef, off the northeast coast of Queensland, Australia, Australia.
