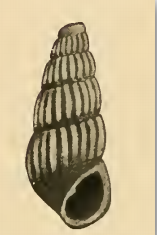
- Apertural view

Scientific classification
- Kingdom: Animalia
- Phylum: Mollusca
- Class: Gastropoda
- Family: Pyramidellidae
- Genus: Parthenina
- Species: P. meta

Binomial name
- Parthenina meta (Dall & Bartsch, 1906)

Synonyms
- Odostomia meta Dall & Bartsch, 1906; Odostomia (Parthenina) meta Dall & Bartsch, 1906

= Parthenina meta =

Species of gastropod

Parthenina meta is a species of sea snail, a marine gastropod mollusk in the family Pyramidellidae, the pyrams and their allies.

== Description ==
The thin, milk-white shell is very small, measuring 2.9 mm. It is turreted, with channeled sutures and an obtuse apex. The nuclear whorls are small, strongly obliquely immersed in the first post-nuclear whorl; only a portion of the last volution is visible. The six post-nuclear whorls overhang somewhat. They are rather high between the sutures, shouldered at the summit, flattened, suddenly contracted below the periphery. The summits of succeeding whorls fall considerably anterior to the periphery, which appears decidedly angular. The whorls are marked by strong axial ribs which extend undiminished over the angular periphery and the base of the body whorl to the umbilical region. Sixteen of these ribs occur upon the second, twenty-two upon the fourth and the penultimate whorl. The ribs are slightly constricted just below the summit, which gives them a beaded appearance. The intercostal spaces are about twice as wide as the ribs, crossed by two closely placed, raised spiral threads, the anterior one of which marks the angulation of the periphery. The junction of ribs and the spiral threads is subnodulose. The base of the shell is moderately long, narrowly umbilicate. The aperture is suboval. The posterior angle is obtuse. The outer lip is rather thick. The columella is strongly curved, with a prominent oblique fold near its insertion. The parietal wall is covered with a heavy callus, which gives the periostracum a completed aspect.

== Distribution ==
This species occurs in the Pacific Ocean off Japan.
