= Pyrgulina dimidiata =

Scientific classification
- Kingdom: Animalia
- Phylum: Mollusca
- Class: Gastropoda
- Family: Pyramidellidae
- Genus: Pyrgulina
- Species: P. dimidiata

Binomial name
- Pyrgulina dimidiata Schander, 1994

Synonyms
- Chrysallida dimidiata Schander, 1994

Species of gastropod

Pyrgulina dimidiata is a species of sea snail, a marine gastropod mollusk in the family Pyramidellidae, the pyrams and their allies.
