= Babella maestratii =

- Shell of Babella maestratii (holotype at MNHN, Paris)

Scientific classification
- Kingdom: Animalia
- Phylum: Mollusca
- Class: Gastropoda
- Family: Pyramidellidae
- Genus: Babella
- Species: B. maestratii

Binomial name
- Babella maestratii Peñas, Rolán & Sabelli, 2020

Species of gastropod

Babella maestratii is a species of sea snail, a marine gastropod mollusk in the family Pyramidellidae, the pyrams and their allies.

== Description ==
(Original description) The shell is very small (less than 2.0 mm), thin-walled, and low-solid, with a conical-pyramidal shape. It is milky white and glossy. The protoconch is of type C, measuring approximately 250 μm in diameter. The teleoconch (H > 65% h) consists of three almost flat whorls, with the body whorl angled at the periphery. The suture is very deep and distinctly canaliculate. The axial sculpture consists of approximately 20 robust ribs, which are almost rectangular in cross-section and about as wide as the interspaces. The ribs are almost invariably prosocline and do not extend to the lower suture. Instead, they abut against a spiral cord situated immediately above the suture, which also prevents their extension onto the base. Consequently, the base bears only growth lines. The spiral sculpture comprises the suprasutural cord, a furrow situated in the adapical portion of the ribs, a thick peripheral cord, and approximately eight additional cords on the base, of which the uppermost is the thickest. The aperture is relatively large and subovate. The columella is slightly arched and opisthocline, bearing a posteriorly directed, pliciform columellar tooth. The outer lip is narrow, and the shell is not umbilicate.

== Distribution ==
This marine species occurs in the Red Sea.
