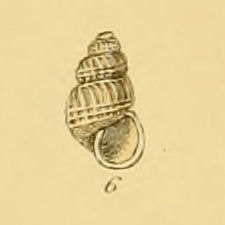

Scientific classification
- Kingdom: Animalia
- Phylum: Mollusca
- Class: Gastropoda
- Family: Pyramidellidae
- Genus: Parthenina
- Species: P. eximia

Binomial name
- Parthenina eximia (Jeffreys, 1849)

Synonyms
- Chrysallida eximia (Jeffreys, 1849); Rissoa eximia Jeffreys, 1849 (original combination)

= Parthenina eximia =

Species of gastropod

Parthenina eximia is a species of sea snail, a marine gastropod mollusk in the family Pyramidellidae, the pyrams and their allies.

== Distribution ==
This marine species occurs in the following locations:

- European waters (ERMS scope)
- United Kingdom Exclusive Economic Zone
