= Parthenina brattstroemi =

Scientific classification
- Kingdom: Animalia
- Phylum: Mollusca
- Class: Gastropoda
- Family: Pyramidellidae
- Genus: Parthenina
- Species: P. brattstroemi

Binomial name
- Parthenina brattstroemi (Warén, 1991)

Synonyms
- Chrysallida brattstroemi Warén, 1991

Species of gastropod

Parthenina brattstroemi is a species of sea snail, a marine gastropod mollusk in the family Pyramidellidae, the pyrams and their allies.

== Distribution ==
This marine species occurs in the following locations:

- European waters (ERMS scope), formerly the Mediterranean Sea
- Portuguese Exclusive Economic Zone
- Spanish Exclusive Economic Zone
