= Babella henni =

- Shell of Babella henni (original image)

Scientific classification
- Kingdom: Animalia
- Phylum: Mollusca
- Class: Gastropoda
- Family: Pyramidellidae
- Genus: Babella
- Species: B. henni

Binomial name
- Babella henni (Brazier, 1894)

Synonyms
- Odostomia (Pyrgulina) henni Brazier, 1894 superseded combination; Odostomia henni Brazier, 1894 superseded combination; Paregila henni (Brazier, 1894) superseded combination

Species of gastropod

Babella henni is a species of sea snail, a marine gastropod mollusk in the family Pyramidellidae, the pyrams and their allies.

== Description ==
The length of the shell varies between 4 mm and 4.5 mm; its diameter 1.5 mm.

(Original description) The shell is fusiformly turreted, solid, and dull white. It has six whorls; the apical whorl is mammillated and smooth, while the remaining whorls are strongly and closely ribbed longitudinally. The spaces between the ribs bear minute transverse striae. The ribs terminate at the periphery, where there is a single deep spiral groove; below this groove, the surface is smooth. The whorls are somewhat flattened, or table-like, at the sutures. The aperture is small and ovate. The columellar plait is transverse, rather sharp, and thickened below; the outer lip is thin.

== Distribution ==
This marine species occurs off Tasmania, Australia.
