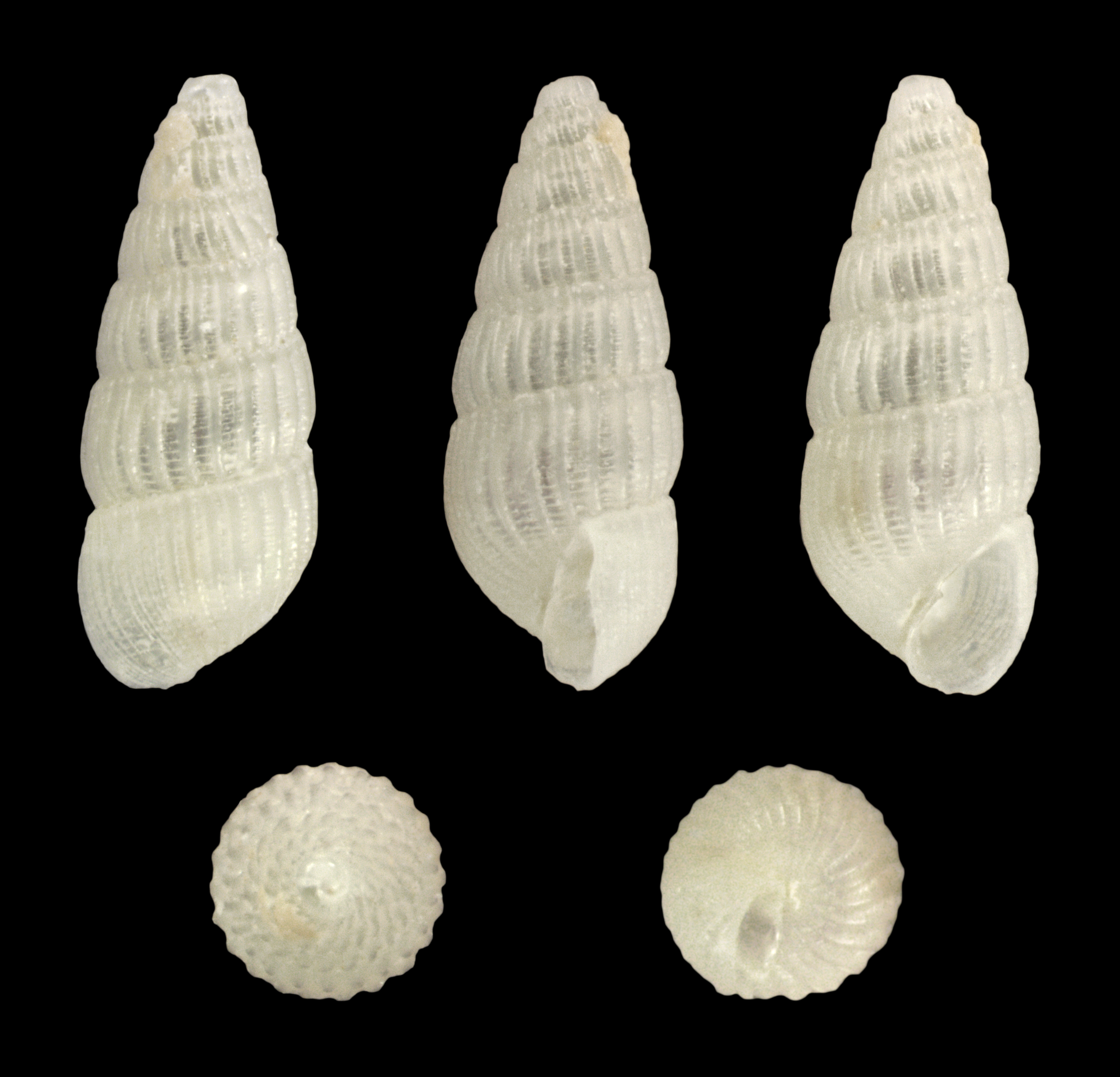

Scientific classification
- Kingdom: Animalia
- Phylum: Mollusca
- Class: Gastropoda
- Family: Pyramidellidae
- Genus: Pyrgulina
- Species: P. pupaeformis

Binomial name
- Pyrgulina pupaeformis (Souverbie, 1865)

Synonyms
- Chrysallida maiae (Hornung & Mermod, 1924); Chrysallida pupula A. Adams, 1861 (doubtful synonym); Dunkeria scalaris dentata F. Nordsieck, 1972 · unaccepted; Linopyrga pascoei (Angas, 1867); Noemia arctelirata de Folin, 1879 · unaccepted; Odostomia costulata Dunker, 1860 (doubtful synonym); Odostomia kreffti Angas, 1867 (doubtful synonym); Odostomia pascoei Angas, 1867 (doubtful synonym); Odostomia pupaeformis (Souverbie, 1865); Pyramidella pupaeformis Souverbie, 1865 (original combination); Pyrgulina costulata (Dunker, 1860); Pyrgulina montbruni Saurin, 1959 (doubyful synonym); Pyrgulina muinamensis Saurin, 1959; Pyrgulina pupula (A. Adams, 1861)

= Pyrgulina pupaeformis =

Species of gastropod

Pyrgulina pupaeformis is a species of sea snail, a marine gastropod mollusk in the family Pyramidellidae, the pyrams and their allies.

== Distribution ==
This marine species occurs in the Gulf of Thailand and off Vietnam; also off New Caledonia.
