= Babella ventricosa =

Scientific classification
- Kingdom: Animalia
- Phylum: Mollusca
- Class: Gastropoda
- Family: Pyramidellidae
- Genus: Babella
- Species: B. ventricosa

Binomial name
- Babella ventricosa (Saurin, 1958)

Synonyms
- Egilina (Numaegilina) ventricosa Saurin, 1958 (basionym); Numaegilina ventricosa (Saurin, 1958)

Species of gastropod

Babella ventricosa is a species of sea snail, a marine gastropod mollusk in the family Pyramidellidae, the pyrams and their allies.

== Distribution ==
This marine species occurs in the Pacific Ocean off the coast of Vietnam.
