= Parthenina palazzii =

Scientific classification
- Kingdom: Animalia
- Phylum: Mollusca
- Class: Gastropoda
- Family: Pyramidellidae
- Genus: Parthenina
- Species: P. palazzii

Binomial name
- Parthenina palazzii (Micali, 1984)

Synonyms
- Chrysallida palazzii Micali, 1984 (basionym)

Species of gastropod

Parthenina palazzii is a species of sea snail, a marine gastropod mollusk in the family Pyramidellidae, the pyrams and their allies.

== Distribution ==
This species occurs in the following locations:

- European waters (ERMS scope)
- Portuguese Exclusive Economic Zone
- Spanish Exclusive Economic Zone
