= Pyrgulina trochiformis =

Scientific classification
- Kingdom: Animalia
- Phylum: Mollusca
- Class: Gastropoda
- Family: Pyramidellidae
- Genus: Pyrgulina
- Species: P. trochiformis

Binomial name
- Pyrgulina trochiformis Saurin, 1959

Synonyms
- Chrysallida (Pyrgulina) trochiformis (Saurin, 1959)

Species of gastropod

Pyrgulina trochiformis is a species of sea snail, a marine gastropod mollusk in the family Pyramidellidae, the pyrams and their allies.

== Distribution ==
This marine species occurs off Vietnam and in the Gulf of Thailand.
