= Pyrgulina obesa =

Scientific classification
- Kingdom: Animalia
- Phylum: Mollusca
- Class: Gastropoda
- Family: Pyramidellidae
- Genus: Pyrgulina
- Species: P. obesa

Binomial name
- Pyrgulina obesa Dautzenberg, 1912

Synonyms
- Chrysallida antimaiae Schander, 1994; Chrysallida obesa (Dautzenberg, 1912)

Species of gastropod

Pyrgulina obesa is a species of sea snail, a marine gastropod mollusk in the family Pyramidellidae, the pyrams and their allies.

== Distribution ==
This species occurs along the Atlantic coast of Africa, and is known from Ghana, Gabon, Republic of the Congo, Angola and Príncipe.
