= Parthenina feldi =

Scientific classification
- Kingdom: Animalia
- Phylum: Mollusca
- Class: Gastropoda
- Family: Pyramidellidae
- Genus: Parthenina
- Species: P. feldi

Binomial name
- Parthenina feldi (van Aartsen, Gittenberger & Goud, 2000)

Synonyms
- Chrysallida (Parthenina) feldi van Aartsen, Gittenberger & Goud, 2000

Species of gastropod

Parthenina feldi is a species of sea snail, a marine gastropod mollusk in the family Pyramidellidae, the pyrams and their allies.

== Distribution ==
This marine species occurs off the following locations:

- Cape Verde
