= Parthenina mauritanica =

Scientific classification
- Kingdom: Animalia
- Phylum: Mollusca
- Class: Gastropoda
- Family: Pyramidellidae
- Genus: Parthenina
- Species: P. mauritanica

Binomial name
- Parthenina mauritanica (Peñas & Rolán, 1998)

Synonyms
- Chrysallida mauritanica Peñas & Rolán, 1998

Species of gastropod

Parthenina mauritanica is a species of sea snail, a marine gastropod mollusk in the family Pyramidellidae, the pyrams and their allies. The specific name mauritanica refers to the country where it was found, Mauritania.
