= Parthenina sergei =

Scientific classification
- Kingdom: Animalia
- Phylum: Mollusca
- Class: Gastropoda
- Family: Pyramidellidae
- Genus: Parthenina
- Species: P. sergei

Binomial name
- Parthenina sergei (Nofroni & Schander, 1994)

Synonyms
- Chrysallida sergei Nofroni & Schander, 1994

Species of gastropod

Parthenina sergei is a species of sea snail, a marine gastropod mollusk in the family Pyramidellidae, the pyrams and their allies.

== Distribution ==
This species occurs in the following locations:

- Known to be located off the west coast of Africa.
