= Pyrgulina sowerbyi =

Scientific classification
- Kingdom: Animalia
- Phylum: Mollusca
- Class: Gastropoda
- Family: Pyramidellidae
- Genus: Pyrgulina
- Species: P. sowerbyi

Binomial name
- Pyrgulina sowerbyi van Aartsen & Corgan, 1996

Synonyms
- Odostomia pretiosa W.H. Turton, 1932; Pyrgulina pretiosa (W. H. Turton, 1932)

Species of gastropod

Pyrgulina sowerbyi is a species of sea snail, a marine gastropod mollusk in the family Pyramidellidae, the pyrams and their allies.

== Homonymy ==
This is a replacement name for Odostomia pretiosa Turtom, 1932 on grounds of secondary homonymy with Pyrgulina pretiosa Dautzenberg & Fischer, 1906, however such homonymy did not exist at the time of replacement as Saurin (1962) had transferred the senior name to Miralda (see ICZN Article 59.2). Aartsen & Corgan's name will be needed if the taxa are regarded as congeneric in the future.
