= Parthenina varia =

Scientific classification
- Kingdom: Animalia
- Phylum: Mollusca
- Class: Gastropoda
- Family: Pyramidellidae
- Genus: Parthenina
- Species: P. varia

Binomial name
- Parthenina varia (Odé, 1993)

Synonyms
- Turbonilla (Pselliogyra) varia Odé, 1993

Species of sea snail

Parthenina varia (previously known as Pselliogyra varia) is a species of sea snail, a marine gastropod mollusk in the family Pyramidellidae, the pyrams and their allies.

== Description ==
The shell grows to a length of 3.1 mm. In terms of its shell, there is great intraspecific variation in the rectilinearity of the whorls with some shells being more convex in profile; in the expression of the axial ribs on the base, with some shells having strong axials while others have evanescent or almost absent axials; and also in the strength of the spiral grooves, which are sometimes especially distinct on the base. The species has great variation in shape (apical angle and slenderness), sculpturing (number of ribs and development of spirals), and the degree of expression of axial ribs on the base.

Parthenina varia is distinguished from P. pyttelilla and P. interstincta by its less distinct spiral thread that is closer to the suture, and the more rectilinear axial ribs, whereas they are rather sinuous in the two European species. In these respects, it is more similar to P.obtusa which also has rectilinear axial ribs, but the spiral cord in this latter species is not located in the transition zone between the whorl and the base as in P.varia, but instead this cord is located on the first fifth of the whorl, forming a suprasutural row of squares

== Behaviour ==
Members of the order Heterostropha are mostly simultaneous hermaphrodites. Similarly, they are associated with ectoparasitism through their family, Pyramidellidae.

== Distribution ==
Observation records indicate that Parthenina varia has a range spanning the Western Atlantic coast, from the north-western Gulf of Mexico to the south of Brazil. Its depth ranges between 16 – 823 m, in soft bottom, Benthic zones
