= Pyrgulina whitechurchi =

Scientific classification
- Kingdom: Animalia
- Phylum: Mollusca
- Class: Gastropoda
- Family: Pyramidellidae
- Genus: Pyrgulina
- Species: P. whitechurchi

Binomial name
- Pyrgulina whitechurchi (W. H. Turton, 1932)

Synonyms
- Turbonilla whitechurchi W.H. Turton, 1932

Species of gastropod

Pyrgulina whitechurchi is a species of sea snail, a marine gastropod mollusk in the family Pyramidellidae, the pyrams and their allies.
