= Pyrgulina bantama =

Scientific classification
- Kingdom: Animalia
- Phylum: Mollusca
- Class: Gastropoda
- Family: Pyramidellidae
- Genus: Pyrgulina
- Species: P. bantama

Binomial name
- Pyrgulina bantama van Aartsen & Corgan, 1996

Synonyms
- Pyrgulina pygmaea Thiele, 1925

Species of gastropod

Pyrgulina bantama is a species of sea snail, a marine gastropod mollusk in the family Pyramidellidae, the pyrams and their allies.
