= Pyrgulina lagrandierei =

Scientific classification
- Kingdom: Animalia
- Phylum: Mollusca
- Class: Gastropoda
- Family: Pyramidellidae
- Genus: Pyrgulina
- Species: P. lagrandierei

Binomial name
- Pyrgulina lagrandierei Saurin, 1959

Synonyms
- Chrysallida (Pyrgulina) lagrandierei (Saurin, 1959)

Species of gastropod

Pyrgulina lagrandierei is a species of sea snail, a marine gastropod mollusk in the family Pyramidellidae, the pyrams and their allies.

== Distribution ==
This marine species occurs off Vietnam.
