= Parthenina moolenbeeki =

Scientific classification
- Kingdom: Animalia
- Phylum: Mollusca
- Class: Gastropoda
- Family: Pyramidellidae
- Genus: Parthenina
- Species: P. moolenbeeki

Binomial name
- Parthenina moolenbeeki (Amati, 1987)

Synonyms
- Chrysallida moolenbeeki Amati, 1987

Species of gastropod

Parthenina moolenbeeki is a species of sea snail, a marine gastropod mollusk in the family Pyramidellidae, the pyrams and their allies.

== Description ==
Original description: "Elongated cone shaped shell, not very robust, whitish coloured. Heterostrophic protoconch with sunken nucleus, sculptured spirally by 4/5 marked cordlets. Teleoconch made up of 3/4 rather convex whorls with an incised suture; these whorls are sculptured axially by slightly wavy prosocline riblets of about the same width as the interspaces. On the body whorl there are 25/30 riblets which extend right up to the base; in adult specimens they are more numerous and closer together. One or, more rarely, two spiral cordlets are present on the superior whorls; always two, well spaced, on the body whorl. Round quadrangular mouth with visible columellar tooth on the inside. Umblical slit evident in adult specimens. Maximum dimensions: height 2 mm. Diameter 1 mm. Operculum and soft parts unknown."

== Distribution ==
Locus typicus: Island of Ponza.

This marine species occurs in the following locations:

- European waters (ERMS scope)
