= Linopyrga rugata =

Scientific classification
- Kingdom: Animalia
- Phylum: Mollusca
- Class: Gastropoda
- Family: Pyramidellidae
- Genus: Linopyrga
- Species: L. rugata

Binomial name
- Linopyrga rugata (Hutton, 1886)

Synonyms
- Odostomia rugata Hutton, 1886

Species of gastropod

Linopyrga rugata is a species of sea snail, a marine gastropod mollusk in the family Pyramidellidae, the pyrams and their allies.
