= Parthenina anselmoi =

Scientific classification
- Kingdom: Animalia
- Phylum: Mollusca
- Class: Gastropoda
- Family: Pyramidellidae
- Genus: Parthenina
- Species: P. anselmoi

Binomial name
- Parthenina anselmoi (Peñas & Rolán, 1998)

Synonyms
- Chrysallida anselmoi Peñas & Rolán, 1998 (original combination)

Species of gastropod

Parthenina anselmoi is a species of sea snail, a marine gastropod mollusk in the family Pyramidellidae, the pyrams and their allies.

== Distribution ==
This species is only known from the coasts of Ghana and the Republic of the Congo.
