= Parthenina sarsi =

Scientific classification
- Kingdom: Animalia
- Phylum: Mollusca
- Class: Gastropoda
- Family: Pyramidellidae
- Genus: Parthenina
- Species: P. sarsi

Binomial name
- Parthenina sarsi (Nordsieck, 1972)

Synonyms
- Chrysallida sarsi Nordsieck, 1972

Species of gastropod

Parthenina sarsi is a species of sea snail, a marine gastropod mollusk in the family Pyramidellidae, the pyrams and their allies. The species is one of a number within the genus Parthenina.

== Distribution ==
This species occurs in the following locations:

- Belgian Exclusive Economic Zone
- European waters (ERMS scope)
- Goote Bank
- United Kingdom Exclusive Economic Zone
- Wimereux
