= Babella ovalis =

- Shell of Babella ovalis (holotype at MNHN, Paris)

Scientific classification
- Kingdom: Animalia
- Phylum: Mollusca
- Class: Gastropoda
- Family: Pyramidellidae
- Genus: Babella
- Species: B. ovalis

Binomial name
- Babella ovalis Peñas, Rolán & Sabelli, 2020

Species of gastropod

Babella ovalis is a species of sea snail, a marine gastropod mollusk in the family Pyramidellidae, the pyrams and their allies.

== Description ==
(Original description) The shell is minute (less than 1.7 mm), yet very solid, sub-oval in outline, milky white, and shiny. The protoconch has a diameter of approximately 200 μm and a nucleus that is exposed over at least three-quarters of its surface. The teleoconch consists of almost four flat whorls (h > 60% H), the last of which is rounded at the periphery. The base is slightly convex, and the suture is deep and canaliculated.

The axial sculpture consists of 16 robust, arched, orthocline to prosocline ribs, which are approximately as wide as the interspaces between them. On the preceding whorls, the ribs extend down to the lower suture, whereas on the last whorl they are abruptly interrupted at the periphery. On the base, only the growth lines are visible.

The spiral sculpture is restricted to the interspaces between the axial ribs. It consists of a well-defined cord immediately above the suture, which does not interrupt the ribs, and several fine cordlets between this main spiral cord and the upper suture. On the body whorl, an additional incipient cordlet is present immediately below the stronger spiral cord, while the base bears four further spiral cords.

The aperture is small and pyriform. The columella is arched and opisthocline, bearing a conspicuous columellar tooth. The outer lip is slightly thickened, and the shell is not umbilicated.

== Distribution ==
This marine species occurs in the Red Sea.
