= Pyrgulina amabilis =

Scientific classification
- Kingdom: Animalia
- Phylum: Mollusca
- Class: Gastropoda
- Family: Pyramidellidae
- Genus: Pyrgulina
- Species: P. amabilis

Binomial name
- Pyrgulina amabilis Saurin, 1959

Synonyms
- Chrysallida (Pyrgulina) amabilis (Saurin, 1959)

Species of gastropod

Pyrgulina amabilis is a species of sea snail, a marine gastropod mollusk in the family Pyramidellidae, the pyrams and their allies.

== Distribution ==
This marine species occurs off Vietnam and the Gulf of Thailand.
