= Pyrgulina pirinthella =

Scientific classification
- Kingdom: Animalia
- Phylum: Mollusca
- Class: Gastropoda
- Family: Pyramidellidae
- Genus: Pyrgulina
- Species: P. pirinthella

Binomial name
- Pyrgulina pirinthella Melvill, 1910

Synonyms
- Chrysallida pirinthella (Melvill, 1910)

Species of gastropod

Pyrgulina pirinthella is a species of sea snail, a marine gastropod mollusk in the family Pyramidellidae, the pyrams and their allies.

== Distribution ==
This marine species occurs in the following locations:

- European waters (ERMS scope)
- Mediterranean Sea
- Mersin Bay
