= Pyrgulina casta =

Scientific classification
- Kingdom: Animalia
- Phylum: Mollusca
- Class: Gastropoda
- Family: Pyramidellidae
- Genus: Pyrgulina
- Species: P. casta

Binomial name
- Pyrgulina casta (A. Adams, 1861)

Synonyms
- Chrysallida casta A. Adams, 1861

Species of gastropod

Pyrgulina casta is a species of sea snail, a marine gastropod mollusk in the family Pyramidellidae, the pyrams and their allies.

== Distribution ==
- Marine
