= Egilina kotoeae =

Scientific classification
- Kingdom: Animalia
- Phylum: Mollusca
- Class: Gastropoda
- Family: Pyramidellidae
- Genus: Egilina
- Species: E. kotoeae

Binomial name
- Egilina kotoeae Hori & Fukuda, 1999

Species of gastropod

Egilina kotoeae is a species of sea snail, a marine gastropod mollusk in the family Pyramidellidae, the pyrams and their allies.
