= Pyrgulina kempermani =

Scientific classification
- Kingdom: Animalia
- Phylum: Mollusca
- Class: Gastropoda
- Family: Pyramidellidae
- Genus: Pyrgulina
- Species: P. kempermani

Binomial name
- Pyrgulina kempermani (van Aartsen, E. Gittenberger & Goud, 2000)

Synonyms
- Chrysallida (Pyrgulina) kempermani van Aartsen, Gittenberger & Goud, 2000

Species of gastropod

Pyrgulina kempermani is a species of sea snail, a marine gastropod mollusk in the family Pyramidellidae, the pyrams and their allies.
