= Parthenina juliae =

Scientific classification
- Kingdom: Animalia
- Phylum: Mollusca
- Class: Gastropoda
- Family: Pyramidellidae
- Genus: Parthenina
- Species: P. juliae

Binomial name
- Parthenina juliae (de Folin, 1872)

Synonyms
- Chrysallida juliae (de Folin, 1872); Chrysallida nanodea (Monterosato, 1878); Odostomia nanodea Monterosato, 1878; Truncatella juliae de Folin, 1872

Species of gastropod

Parthenina juliae is a species of sea snail, a marine gastropod mollusk in the family Pyramidellidae, the pyrams and their allies.

== Distribution ==
This species occurs in the following locations:

- European waters (ERMS scope)
- Greek Exclusive Economic Zone
- Portuguese Exclusive Economic Zone
- South West Coast of Apulia
- Spanish Exclusive Economic Zone
