= Babella mariellaeformis =

- Shell of Babella mariellaeformis

Scientific classification
- Kingdom: Animalia
- Phylum: Mollusca
- Class: Gastropoda
- Family: Pyramidellidae
- Genus: Babella
- Species: B. mariellaeformis

Binomial name
- Babella mariellaeformis (Nomura, 1938)

Synonyms
- Chrysallida (Miralda) mariellaeformis Nomura, 1938; Egilina mariellaeformis (Nomura, 1938); Miralda mariellaeformis Nomura, 1938 (original combination)

Species of gastropod

Babella mariellaeformis is a species of sea snail, a marine gastropod mollusk in the family Pyramidellidae, the pyrams and their allies.

== Distribution ==
This marine species occurs off Japan.
