= Parthenina willeminae =

Scientific classification
- Kingdom: Animalia
- Phylum: Mollusca
- Class: Gastropoda
- Family: Pyramidellidae
- Genus: Parthenina
- Species: P. willeminae

Binomial name
- Parthenina willeminae (van Aartsen, Gittenberger E. & Goud, 2000)

Synonyms
- Chrysallida (Parthenina) willeminae van Aartsen, Gittenberger & Goud, 2000

Species of gastropod

Parthenina willeminae is a species of sea snail, a marine gastropod mollusk in the family Pyramidellidae, the pyrams and their allies.

== Description ==
The size of the shell varies between 2.6 mm and 3 mm.

== Distribution ==
This species occurs in the Atlantic Ocean off Mauritania.
