= Parthenina penchynati =

Scientific classification
- Kingdom: Animalia
- Phylum: Mollusca
- Class: Gastropoda
- Family: Pyramidellidae
- Genus: Parthenina
- Species: P. penchynati

Binomial name
- Parthenina penchynati (Bucquoy, Dautzenberg & Dollfus, 1883)

Synonyms
- Chrysallida penchynati (Bucquoy, Dautzenberg & Dollfus, 1883)

Species of gastropod

Parthenina penchynati is a species of sea snail (a marine gastropod mollusk) in the family Pyramidellidae, the pyrams and their allies. The species is one of a number within the gastropod genus Parthenina.

== Distribution ==
This species occurs in the following locations:

- Portuguese Exclusive Economic Zone
- Spanish Exclusive Economic Zone
