= Pyrgulina dominicae =

Scientific classification
- Kingdom: Animalia
- Phylum: Mollusca
- Class: Gastropoda
- Family: Pyramidellidae
- Genus: Pyrgulina
- Species: P. dominicae

Binomial name
- Pyrgulina dominicae Saurin, 1959

Synonyms
- Chrysallida (Pyrgulina) dominicae (Saurin, 1959)

Species of gastropod

Pyrgulina dominicae is a species of sea snail, a marine gastropod mollusk in the family Pyramidellidae, the pyrams and their allies.

== Distribution ==
This marine species occurs off Vietnam.
