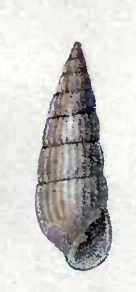
- Drawing of a shell of Pyrgulina interstriata

Scientific classification
- Kingdom: Animalia
- Phylum: Mollusca
- Class: Gastropoda
- Family: Pyramidellidae
- Genus: Pyrgulina
- Species: P. interstriata

Binomial name
- Pyrgulina interstriata (Souverbie, 1866)

Synonyms
- Odostomia densecostata Garrett; Odostomia interstriata Souverbie, 1866 (basionym)

= Pyrgulina interstriata =

Species of gastropod

Pyrgulina interstriata is a species of sea snail, a marine gastropod mollusk in the family Pyramidellidae, the pyrams and their allies.

== Description ==
The thin shell is subpellucid, somewhat glossy, and cinereous. The length of the shell measures 4 mm. The seven whorls of the teleoconch are longitudinally ribbed. The interstices are marked by close spiral striae;. The columella contains a stout fold.

== Distribution ==
This species occurs in the Pacific Ocean off New Caledonia, Samoa and Fiji Islands.
