= Pyrgulina scripta =

Scientific classification
- Kingdom: Animalia
- Phylum: Mollusca
- Class: Gastropoda
- Family: Pyramidellidae
- Genus: Pyrgulina
- Species: P. scripta

Binomial name
- Pyrgulina scripta van Aartsen & Corgan, 1996

Synonyms
- Turbonilla sculpturata W.H. Turton, 1932

Species of gastropod

Pyrgulina scripta is a species of sea snail, a marine gastropod mollusk in the family Pyramidellidae, the pyrams and their allies.
