= Pyrgulina nana =

Scientific classification
- Kingdom: Animalia
- Phylum: Mollusca
- Class: Gastropoda
- Family: Pyramidellidae
- Genus: Pyrgulina
- Species: P. nana

Binomial name
- Pyrgulina nana Hornung & Mermod, 1924

Synonyms
- Chrysallida micronana Öztürk & van Aartsen, 2006

Species of gastropod

Pyrgulina nana is a species of sea snail, a marine gastropod mollusk in the family Pyramidellidae, the pyrams and their allies.

== Distribution ==
This species occurs in the eastern part of the Mediterranean Sea, off the following locations:

- Güllük Bay
- Massawa
- Mersin Bay

It is also found in the Aegean Sea and in the Red Sea off Eritrea.
