= Parthenina josae =

Scientific classification
- Kingdom: Animalia
- Phylum: Mollusca
- Class: Gastropoda
- Family: Pyramidellidae
- Genus: Parthenina
- Species: P. josae

Binomial name
- Parthenina josae (van Aartsen, Gittenberger & Goud, 2000)

Synonyms
- Chrysallida (Parthenina) josae van Aartsen, Gittenberger & Goud, 2000

Species of gastropod

Parthenina josae is a species of sea snail, a marine gastropod mollusk in the family Pyramidellidae, the pyrams and their allies.

== Distribution ==
This marine species occurs in the following locations:

- Cape Verde archipelago
