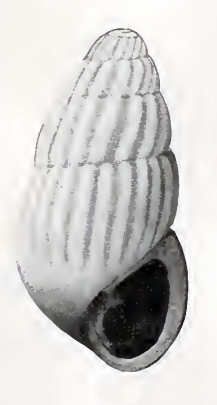
- Drawing of a shell of Pyrgulina arfica

Scientific classification
- Kingdom: Animalia
- Phylum: Mollusca
- Class: Gastropoda
- Family: Pyramidellidae
- Genus: Pyrgulina
- Species: P. arfica

Binomial name
- Pyrgulina arfica (Bartsch, 1915)

Synonyms
- Odostomia (Pyrgulina) arfica Bartsch, 1915 (basionym)

= Pyrgulina arfica =

Species of gastropod

Pyrgulina arfica is a species of sea snail, a marine gastropod mollusk in the family Pyramidellidae, the pyrams and their allies.

== Description ==
The bluish-white, rather solid shell has an elongate-ovate shape. Its length measures 4 mm. The whorls of the protoconch are decollated. The five whorls of the teleoconch are well rounded, and strongly shouldered at the summit. They are marked by stout, well-rounded, somewhat sinuous, decidedly protractive, axial ribs, which are about as wide as the spaces that separate them. Of these ribs, 14 occur upon the first, 16 upon the second, 18 upon the third, and 22 upon the penultimate turn. These ribs render the summit of the whorls decidedly crenulated. In addition to the ribs the intercostal spaces are marked between the sutures by exceedingly fine, closely spaced, spiral striations, of which about 35 are present upon the third turn. The sutures are strongly impressed. The periphery of the body whorl is well rounded. The base of the shell is moderately long, narrowly umbilicated, and well rounded. It is marked by the feeble continuation of the axial ribs, and numerous spiral striations The aperture is oval. The posterior angle is obtuse. The outer lip is rather thick. The inner lip is decidedly curved, and somewhat reflected. It is provided with a very strong, oblique fold at its insertion. The parietal wall is covered by a thick callus, which renders the peritreme practically complete.

== Distribution ==
This marine species occurs off Port Alfred, South Africa.
