= Pyrgulina pinguis =

Scientific classification
- Kingdom: Animalia
- Phylum: Mollusca
- Class: Gastropoda
- Family: Pyramidellidae
- Genus: Pyrgulina
- Species: P. pinguis

Binomial name
- Pyrgulina pinguis (Peñas & Rolán, 1998)

Synonyms
- Chrysallida pinguis Peñas & Rolán, 1998 (original combination)

Species of gastropod

Pyrgulina pinguis is a species of sea snail, a marine gastropod mollusk in the family Pyramidellidae, the pyrams and their allies.
