= Babella khmeriana =

Scientific classification
- Kingdom: Animalia
- Phylum: Mollusca
- Class: Gastropoda
- Family: Pyramidellidae
- Genus: Babella
- Species: B. khmeriana

Binomial name
- Babella khmeriana (Saurin, 1962)

Synonyms
- Numaegilina khmeriana Saurin, 1962 · (original combination)

Species of gastropod

Babella khmeriana is a species of sea snail, a marine gastropod mollusk in the family Pyramidellidae, the pyrams and their allies.

== Distribution ==
This marine species occurs in the Gulf of Thailand
