= Parthenina gabmulderi =

Scientific classification
- Kingdom: Animalia
- Phylum: Mollusca
- Class: Gastropoda
- Family: Pyramidellidae
- Genus: Parthenina
- Species: P. gabmulderi

Binomial name
- Parthenina gabmulderi (van Aartsen, Gittenberger & Goud, 2000)

Synonyms
- Chrysallida (Parthenina) gabmulderi van Aartsen, Gittenberger & Goud, 2000

Species of gastropod

Parthenina gabmulderi is a species of sea snail, a marine gastropod mollusk in the family Pyramidellidae, the pyrams and their allies.

== Distribution ==
This marine species occurs off the following locations:

- Cape Verde
