= Babella micronodulosa =

- Shell of Babella micronodulosa (holotype at MNHN, Paris)

Scientific classification
- Kingdom: Animalia
- Phylum: Mollusca
- Class: Gastropoda
- Family: Pyramidellidae
- Genus: Babella
- Species: B. micronodulosa

Binomial name
- Babella micronodulosa Peñas, Rolán & Sabelli, 2020

Species of gastropod

Babella micronodulosa is a species of sea snail, a marine gastropod mollusk in the family Pyramidellidae, the pyrams and their allies.

== Description ==
(Original description) The shell is minute (less than 1.5 mm in height), relatively thin and not very solid, with a broadly truncate-conical shape and a height-to-diameter ratio (H/D) of 1.8. It is milk-white in colour and has a shiny surface. The protoconch is relatively high, with a diameter of approximately 240 μm. The teleoconch has a very short spire consisting of 2.5 flat whorls, the last of which is angular at the periphery. The suture is deep and canaliculate.

The axial sculpture consists of approximately 18 robust, rounded ribs that are slightly wider than the interspaces and strongly prosocline in orientation. These ribs extend downwards, becoming progressively attenuated towards the lower suture after crossing the spiral cord situated along the suture. On the base, the ribs gradually disappear and are replaced by fine growth lines. The spiral sculpture is dominated by a thick cord running along the suture, which forms distinct nodules where it intersects the axial ribs. The adapical area also bears a spiral groove close to the suture, together with additional nodules on the upper portions of the ribs.

The aperture is relatively large and suboval. The columella is curved and opisthocline, bordering a narrow umbilical chink. No columellar tooth is visible, and the outer lip is not thickened.

== Distribution ==
This marine species occurs in the Red Sea.
