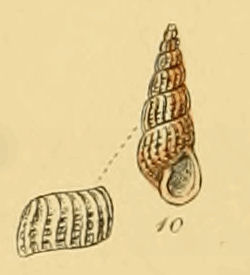

Scientific classification
- Kingdom: Animalia
- Phylum: Mollusca
- Class: Gastropoda
- Family: Pyramidellidae
- Genus: Parthenina
- Species: P. clathrata

Binomial name
- Parthenina clathrata (Jeffreys, 1848)

Synonyms
- Chrysallida clathrata (Jeffreys, 1848); Odostomia clathrata Jeffreys, 1848

= Parthenina clathrata =

Species of gastropod

Parthenina clathrata is a species of sea snail, a marine gastropod mollusk in the family Pyramidellidae, the pyrams and their allies.

== Distribution ==
This marine species occurs in the following locations:

- European waters (ERMS scope)
- Greek Exclusive Economic Zone
- Irish Exclusive economic Zone
- Portuguese Exclusive Economic Zone
- Spanish Exclusive Economic Zone
- United Kingdom Exclusive Economic Zone
