= Parthenina limitum =

Scientific classification
- Kingdom: Animalia
- Phylum: Mollusca
- Class: Gastropoda
- Family: Pyramidellidae
- Genus: Parthenina
- Species: P. limitum

Binomial name
- Parthenina limitum (Brusina in de Folin & Périer, 1876)

Synonyms
- Chrysallida limitum (Brusina in de Folin & Périer, 1876); Turbonilla limitum Brusina in de Folin & Périer, 1876 (original combination)

Species of gastropod

Parthenina limitum is a species of sea snail, a marine gastropod mollusk in the family Pyramidellidae, the pyrams and their allies.

== Distribution ==
This marine species occurs in the following locations:

- European waters (ERMS scope)
