= Pyrgulina epentromidea =

Scientific classification
- Kingdom: Animalia
- Phylum: Mollusca
- Class: Gastropoda
- Family: Pyramidellidae
- Genus: Pyrgulina
- Species: P. epentromidea

Binomial name
- Pyrgulina epentromidea Melvill, 1899

Synonyms
- Chrysallida epentromidea (Melvill, 1899)

Species of gastropod

Pyrgulina epentromidea is a species of sea snail, a marine gastropod mollusk in the family Pyramidellidae, the pyrams and their allies.

== Distribution ==
This marine species occurs in the Red Sea, off Vietnam and in the Gulf of Thailand.
