= Parthenina pyttelilla =

Scientific classification
- Kingdom: Animalia
- Phylum: Mollusca
- Class: Gastropoda
- Family: Pyramidellidae
- Genus: Parthenina
- Species: P. pyttelilla

Binomial name
- Parthenina pyttelilla (Schander, 1994)

Synonyms
- Chrysallida pyttelilla Schander, 1994

Species of gastropod

Parthenina pyttelilla is a species of sea snail, a marine gastropod mollusk in the family Pyramidellidae, the pyrams and their allies.
