= Parthenina rinaldii =

Scientific classification
- Kingdom: Animalia
- Phylum: Mollusca
- Class: Gastropoda
- Family: Pyramidellidae
- Genus: Parthenina
- Species: P. rinaldii

Binomial name
- Parthenina rinaldii (Micali & Nofroni, 2004)

Synonyms
- Chrysallida rinaldii Micali & Nofroni, 2004

Species of gastropod

Parthenina rinaldii is a species of sea snail, a marine gastropod mollusk in the family Pyramidellidae, the pyrams and their allies.
