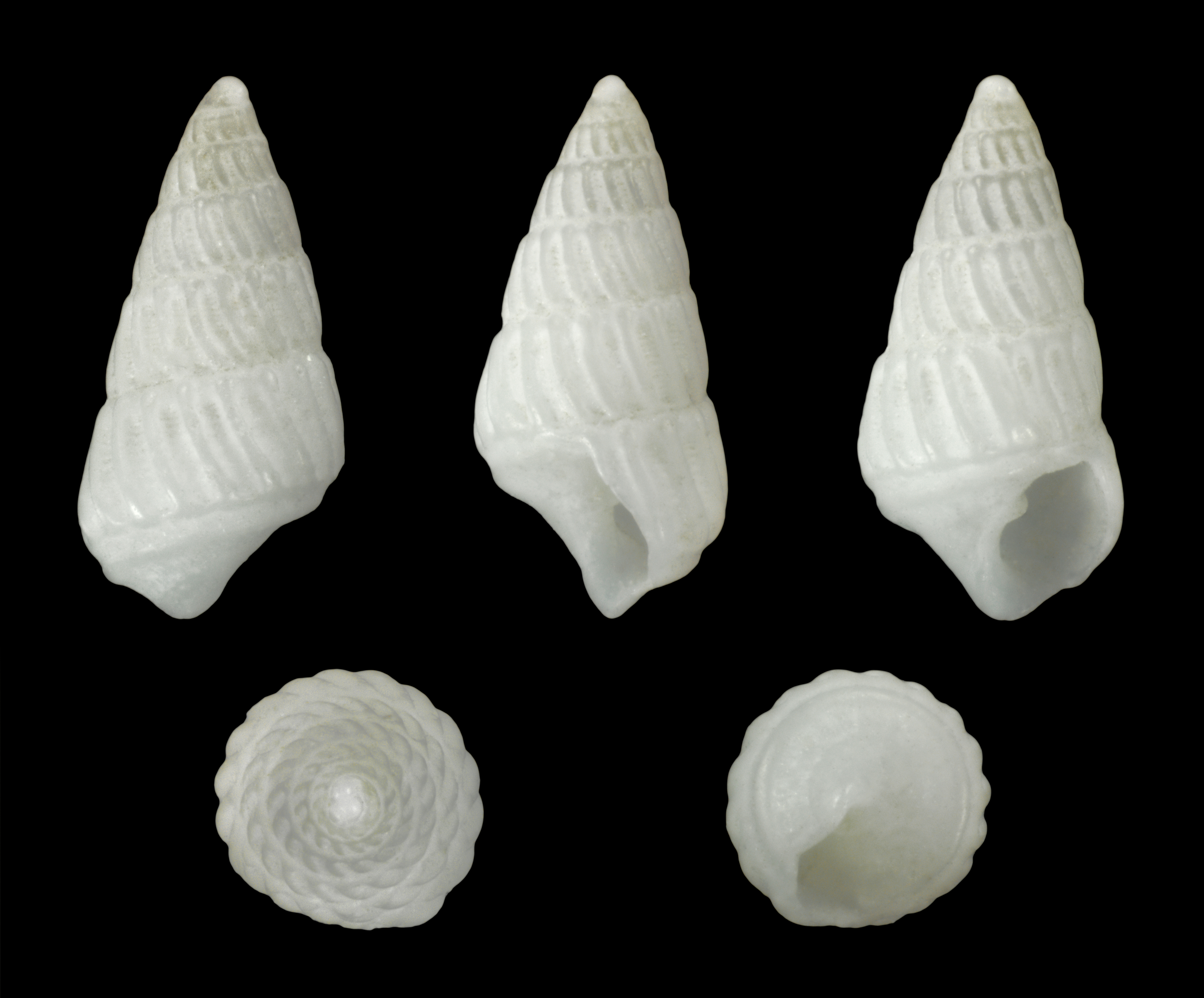

Scientific classification
- Kingdom: Animalia
- Phylum: Mollusca
- Class: Gastropoda
- Family: Pyramidellidae
- Genus: Babella
- Species: B. gloria

Binomial name
- Babella gloria (Nomura, S., 1938)

Synonyms
- Chrysallida (Numaegilina) gloria Nomura, 1938 (basionym); Chrysallida gloria Nomura, 1938 (original combination); Numaegilina gloria (Nomura, 1938)

= Babella gloria =

Species of gastropod

Babella gloria is a species of sea snail, a marine gastropod mollusk in the family Pyramidellidae, the pyrams and their allies.

== Description ==
The shell size ranges from being as minute as 3 mm to as large as 4.1 mm.

== Distribution ==
This marine species occurs off the coast of the Philippines and other surrounding minor islands.
