= Pyrgulina kampotensis =

Scientific classification
- Kingdom: Animalia
- Phylum: Mollusca
- Class: Gastropoda
- Family: Pyramidellidae
- Genus: Pyrgulina
- Species: P. kampotensis

Binomial name
- Pyrgulina kampotensis Saurin, 1961

Synonyms
- Chrysallida (Pyrgulina) kampotensis (Saurin, 1961)

Species of gastropod

Pyrgulina kampotensis is a species of sea snail, a marine gastropod mollusk in the family Pyramidellidae, the pyrams and their allies.

== Distribution ==
This marine species occurs in the Gulf of Thailand and Indian Ocean.
