= Linopyrga pulchra =

Scientific classification
- Kingdom: Animalia
- Phylum: Mollusca
- Class: Gastropoda
- Family: Pyramidellidae
- Genus: Linopyrga
- Species: L. pulchra

Binomial name
- Linopyrga pulchra (Garrett, 1873)

Synonyms
- Odostomia pulchra Garrett, 1873

Species of gastropod

Linopyrga pulchra is a species of sea snail, a marine gastropod mollusk in the family Pyramidellidae, the pyrams and their allies.
