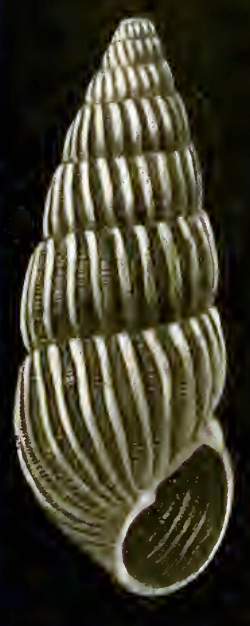
- Apertural view of a shell of Pyrgulina densecostata

Scientific classification
- Kingdom: Animalia
- Phylum: Mollusca
- Class: Gastropoda
- Family: Pyramidellidae
- Genus: Pyrgulina
- Species: P. densecostata

Binomial name
- Pyrgulina densecostata (Garrett, 1873)

Synonyms
- Odostomia (Pyrgulina) densecostata Garrett, 1873 (basionym)

= Pyrgulina densecostata =

Species of gastropod

Pyrgulina densecostata is a species of very small sea snail, a pyramidellid gastropod micromollusk. This genus is currently placed in the subfamily Chrysallidinae of the family Pyramidellidae.

== Description ==
The very thin shell is elongate-ovate, subdiaphanous, milk-white, and shining. It measures 4 mm. The nuclear whorls are almost completely obliquely immersed in the first post-nuclear whorl. The eight post-nuclear whorls are rounded, rather inflated, and moderately shouldered. They are marked by many well-developed, regular, rounded, toward the aperture slanting axial ribs, of which twenty occur upon the second, twenty-four upon the fifth, and thirty upon the penultimate whorl. These ribs are somewhat thickened at their posterior extremity and give the summits of the whorls a beaded appearance. The intercostal spaces are a little wider than the ribs, crossed by many incised spiral lines, which are about as wide as the raised spaces between them. These incised spiral lines are a little less strongly developed on the posterior portion of the whorls, where the ribs are thickened, but anterior to these thickenings they are very regular and regularly-spaced. There are eighteen on the fifth and twenty-six on the penultimate whorl. The periphery and the base of the body whorl are well rounded, the latter marked by the strong continuations of the axial ribs, which extend almost undiminished to the umbilical region. The intercostal spaces on the base are marked like those between the sutures by twenty-two incised spiral lines. The sutures are well marked. The aperture is moderately large. The posterior angle is acute. The outer lip is thin, showing the external sculpture within. The junction of columella and the outer lip is well rounded. The columella is decidedly curved, thin, somewhat revolute, provided with a prominent oblique fold, a little anterior to its insertion. This fold joins the columella in such a manner as to give this a decidedly sigmoid curve. The parietal wall lacks a callus.

== Distribution ==
This species occurs in the Pacific Ocean off the Viti Levu Group, Fiji.
