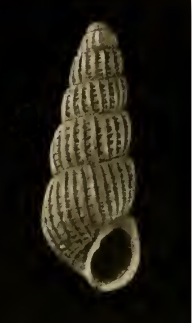
- Apertural view of Linopyrga tantilla

Scientific classification
- Kingdom: Animalia
- Phylum: Mollusca
- Class: Gastropoda
- Family: Pyramidellidae
- Tribe: Chrysallidini
- Genus: Linopyrga; Laws, 1941

Type species
- Odostomia rugata Hutton, 1886

Species
- See text

= Linopyrga =

Genus of gastropods

Linopyrga is a small genus of very small sea snails, pyramidellid gastropod mollusks or micromollusks. This genus is currently placed in the subfamily Chrysallidinae of the family Odostomiidae.

== Shell description ==
The original description of the genus can be found at:

== Life history ==
Nothing is known about the biology of the members of this genus. As is true of most members of the Pyramidellidae sensu lato, they are (were) most likely ectoparasites.

== Species ==
Species within the genus Linopyrga include:

- Linopyrga australis (Thiele, 1930)
- Linopyrga bisculpta Laseron, 1951
- Linopyrga brevis (Pritchard, 1900)
- Linopyrga ceria Laseron, 1951
- Linopyrga fannyae (Saurin, 1959)
- Linopyrga feriarum (Saurin, 1959)
- Linopyrga fornix Laseron, 1951
- † Linopyrga junior Laws, 1941
- Linopyrga lineata (Saurin, 1959)
- Linopyrga nugatoria (Hedley, 1903)
- Linopyrga ovalis (de Folin & Perier, 1875)
- Linopyrga pascoei (Angas, 1867)
- Linopyrga pegma (Laseron, 1951)
- Linopyrga perscalata (Hedley, 1909)
- Linopyrga portseaensis (Gatliff & Gabriel, 1911)
- Linopyrga primitractus (Saurin, 1959)
- † Linopyrga pseudorugata (Marshall & Murdoch)
- Linopyrga pulchra (Garrett, 1873)
- Linopyrga punctigera (A. Adams, 1860)
- Linopyrga rugata (Hutton, 1886) (Type species) as Odostomia rugata
- Linopyrga reticulata Laseron, 1959
- Linopyrga rugata (Hutton, 1886)
- Linopyrga sanguis Laws, 1941
- Linopyrga sinus (Saurin, 1959)
- Linopyrga tantilla (A, Adams, 1863)
