= Babella nimiaprocostae =

- Shell of Babella nimiaprocostae (holotype at MNHN, Paris)

Scientific classification
- Kingdom: Animalia
- Phylum: Mollusca
- Class: Gastropoda
- Family: Pyramidellidae
- Genus: Babella
- Species: B. nimiaprocostae

Binomial name
- Babella nimiaprocostae Peñas, Rolán & Sabelli, 2020

Species of gastropod

Babella nimiaprocostae is a species of sea snail, a marine gastropod mollusk in the family Pyramidellidae, the pyrams and their allies.

== Description ==
(Original description)The shell is very small (less than 2 mm in height), relatively fragile, conical-pyramidal in shape, milky white in colour, and somewhat glossy. The protoconch measures approximately 240 μm in diameter. The teleoconch has a moderately elevated spire (h = 66% H) and consists of three flat-convex whorls, the last of which is somewhat rounded at the periphery. The suture is shallow and slightly canaliculate, with small axial cordlets occurring locally along its course.

The axial sculpture consists of 22–24 rounded ribs, which are wider than the interspaces and strongly prosocline in orientation. These ribs become thickened towards their adapical ends but do not reach the suture, being interrupted by a weakly developed spiral cord situated immediately above it. They do not extend onto the base. The spiral sculpture comprises a suprasutural cord, numerous fine ridges occupying the interspaces between the barely visible ribs, one peripheral cord on the body whorl, and four additional spiral cords on the base.

The aperture is relatively large and suboval in shape. The columella is curved and opisthocline, bearing a late-developing columellar tooth. The outer lip is not thickened, and the shell lacks an umbilicus.

== Distribution ==
This marine species occurs in the Red Sea.
