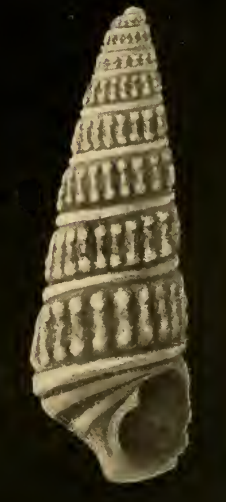
- Apertural view of a shell of Babella caelatior

Scientific classification
- Kingdom: Animalia
- Phylum: Mollusca
- Class: Gastropoda
- Family: Pyramidellidae
- Genus: Babella
- Species: B. caelatior

Binomial name
- Babella caelatior (Dall & Bartsch, 1906)

Synonyms
- Babella caelata (A. Adams, 1863); Parthenia caelata A. Adams, 1863; Pyrgulina (Egilina) caelata (A. Adams, 1863); Turbonilla (Babella) caelatior Dall & Bartsch, 1906; Turbonilla caelatior Dall & Bartsch, 1906 (original combination)

= Babella caelatior =

Species of gastropod

Babella caelatior is a species of sea snail, a marine gastropod mollusk in the family Pyramidellidae, the pyrams and their allies. The species is one of twelve in the gastropod genus Babella.

== Description ==
The milk-white shell has an elongate-conic, turreted shape. Its length measures 4.4 mm. The three whorls of the protoconch are small, helicoid, rather loosely coiled and elevated. They have their axis at a right angle to the axis of the later whorls and about one-third immersed in the first of them. The nine whorls of the teleoconch are flattened, strongly sculptured, with axial ribs and three spiral keels. There is a strong, rounded, rather broad spiral keel on each side of the deeply sulcate periphery. The peripheral sulcus is about as wide as a keel and marks the path for the shouldered and crenulated summit of the succeeding whorls. A second deep spiral sulcus, equal in width to the peripheral one, is situated just posterior to the posterior keel, and this marks the anterior termination of the strong, rounded, backward-slanting axial ribs between the sutures. Sixteen of these ribs occur upon the second, seventeen upon the fifth, and twenty upon the penultimate whorl. The intercostal spaces almost as wide as the ribs, crossed by two strongly impressed, moderately broad spiral lines, which also pass over and somewhat constrict the axial ribs, giving them a dumbbell-shaped outline. The posterior thickened portion is a little wider than the anterior one. The space between these two deeply impressed lines is crossed by about eight minute, subequally spaced spiral striations. The periphery of the body whorl is deeply sulcate, crossed by numerous closely spaced axial striations. The keel anterior to the periphery is almost as strong as the one posterior to it. The third keel is a little anterior to the middle of the base and is rather low and broad. The space between it and the keel above is gently rounded and finely axially striated, which is also true of the space between this keel and the umbilical area. The aperture is moderately large, suboval, effuse at the junction of the outer lip and the columella. The posterior angle is obtuse. The outer lip is thin, irregular in outline, showing the external sculpture within. The columella is short, curved, stout, bearing a strong, acute, oblique fold a little anterior to its insertion. The parietal wall is covered by a thin callus.

== Distribution ==
This species has only ever occurred within the Pacific Ocean off the east coast of Japan.
