= Babella prominens =

- Shell of Babella prominens (holotype at MNHN, Paris)

Scientific classification
- Kingdom: Animalia
- Phylum: Mollusca
- Class: Gastropoda
- Family: Pyramidellidae
- Genus: Babella
- Species: B. prominens

Binomial name
- Babella prominens Peñas & Rolán, 2017

Species of gastropod

Babella prominens is a species of sea snail, a marine gastropod mollusk in the family Pyramidellidae, the pyrams and their allies. The species is one of twelve in the gastropod genus Babella.

== Distribution ==
This marine species occurs in the South Pacific Ocean off Vanuatu.
