= Babella ceciriana =

- Shell of Babella ceciriana (holotype at MNHN, Paris)

Scientific classification
- Kingdom: Animalia
- Phylum: Mollusca
- Class: Gastropoda
- Family: Pyramidellidae
- Genus: Babella
- Species: B. ceciriana

Binomial name
- Babella ceciriana Saurin, 1959

Species of gastropod

Babella ceciriana is a species of sea snail, a marine gastropod mollusk in the family Pyramidellidae, the pyrams and their allies. The species is one of twelve known species in the Babella genus of Gastropods.

== Description ==
The shell reaches a length of 4 mm.

== Distribution ==
This marine species occurs off Vietnam.
