= Babella palmarium =

Scientific classification
- Kingdom: Animalia
- Phylum: Mollusca
- Class: Gastropoda
- Family: Pyramidellidae
- Genus: Babella
- Species: B. palmarium

Binomial name
- Babella palmarium Poppe, 2025

Species of gastropod

Babella palmarium is a species of sea snail, a marine gastropod mollusk in the family Pyramidellidae, the pyrams and their allies.

== Distribution ==
This marine species occurs in the South China Sea off Taiwan.
