= Pyrgulina fischeri =

Scientific classification
- Kingdom: Animalia
- Phylum: Mollusca
- Class: Gastropoda
- Family: Pyramidellidae
- Genus: Pyrgulina
- Species: P. fischeri

Binomial name
- Pyrgulina fischeri (Hornung & Mermod, 1925)

Synonyms
- Chrysallida fischeri (Hornung & Mermod, 1925)

Species of gastropod

Pyrgulina fischeri is a species of sea snail, a marine gastropod mollusk in the family Pyramidellidae, the pyrams and their allies.

== Distribution ==
This marine species occurs in the following locations:

- European waters (ERMS scope)
- Mediterranean Sea
