= Parthenina decussata =

Scientific classification
- Kingdom: Animalia
- Phylum: Mollusca
- Class: Gastropoda
- Family: Pyramidellidae
- Genus: Parthenina
- Species: P. decussata

Binomial name
- Parthenina decussata (Montagu, 1803)

Synonyms
- Chrysallida decussata (Montagu, 1803)

Species of gastropod

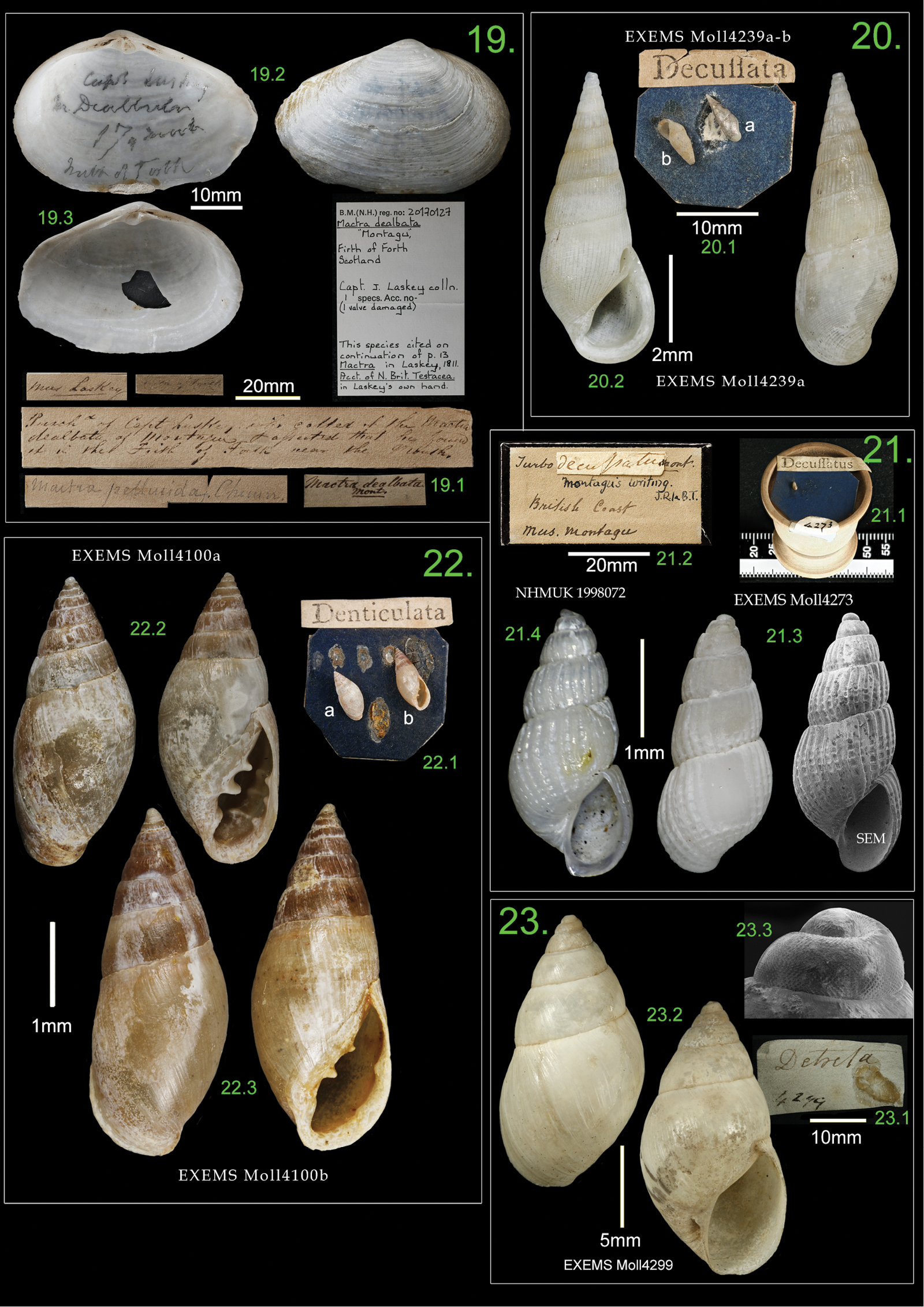
Figure 21 depicts Parthenina decussata

Parthenina decussata is a species of sea snail, a marine gastropod mollusk in the family Pyramidellidae, the pyrams and their allies.

== Distribution ==
This species occurs in the following locations:

- Belgian Exclusive Economic Zone
- European waters (ERMS scope)
- Greek Exclusive Economic Zone
- Irish Exclusive economic Zone
- Portuguese Exclusive Economic Zone
- Spanish Exclusive Economic Zone
- United Kingdom Exclusive Economic Zone
