= Parthenina emaciata =

Scientific classification
- Kingdom: Animalia
- Phylum: Mollusca
- Class: Gastropoda
- Family: Pyramidellidae
- Genus: Parthenina
- Species: P. emaciata

Binomial name
- Parthenina emaciata (Brusina, 1866)

Synonyms
- Chrysallida emaciata (Brusina, 1866); Turbonilla ambigua Weinkauff, 1868; Turbonilla emaciata Brusina, 1866 (original combination); Turbonilla pygmaea Brusina, 1865

Species of gastropod

Parthenina emaciata is a species of sea snail, a marine gastropod mollusk in the family Pyramidellidae, the pyrams and their allies. The species is one of a number within the genus Chrysallida.

== Distribution ==
This marine species occurs in the following locations:

- European waters (ERMS scope)
- Greek Exclusive Economic Zone
- Italy
- Mediterranean Sea
- Portuguese Exclusive Economic Zone
- South West Coast of Apulia
- Spanish Exclusive Economic Zone

== Notes ==
Additional information regarding this species:

- Habitat: Known from rocky shores.
