= Pyrgulina durabilis =

Scientific classification
- Kingdom: Animalia
- Phylum: Mollusca
- Class: Gastropoda
- Family: Pyramidellidae
- Genus: Pyrgulina
- Species: P. durabilis

Binomial name
- Pyrgulina durabilis van Aartsen & Corgan, 1996

Synonyms
- Odostomia robusta G.B. Sowerby III, 1901

Species of gastropod

Pyrgulina durabilis is a species of sea snail, a marine gastropod mollusk in the family Pyramidellidae, the pyrams and their allies.
