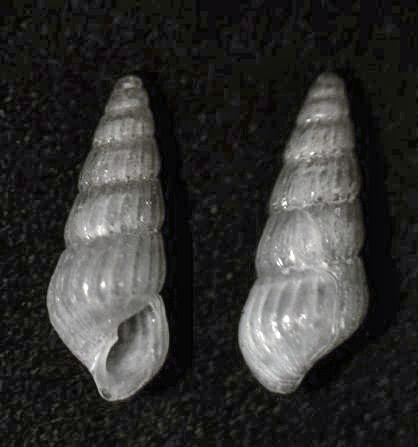
- Shell of Parthenina terebellum

Scientific classification
- Kingdom: Animalia
- Phylum: Mollusca
- Class: Gastropoda
- Family: Pyramidellidae
- Genus: Parthenina
- Species: P. terebellum

Binomial name
- Parthenina terebellum (Philippi, 1844)

Synonyms
- Chemnitzia terebellum Philippi, 1844 (original combination); Chrysallida terebellum (Philippi, 1844); Odostomia moulinsiana P. Fischer, 1864; Parthenina desmoulinsiana Locard, 1886; Pyrgulina denticula Coen, 1933

= Parthenina terebellum =

Species of gastropod

Parthenina terebellum is a species of sea snail, a marine gastropod mollusk in the family Pyramidellidae, the pyrams and their allies.

== Distribution ==
This marine species occurs in the following locations:

- European waters (ERMS scope)
- Greek Exclusive Economic Zone
- Portuguese Exclusive Economic Zone
- Spanish Exclusive Economic Zone
- United Kingdom Exclusive Economic Zone
- The Canaries
