= Linopyrga portseaensis =

Scientific classification
- Kingdom: Animalia
- Phylum: Mollusca
- Class: Gastropoda
- Family: Pyramidellidae
- Genus: Linopyrga
- Species: L. portseaensis

Binomial name
- Linopyrga portseaensis (Gatliff & Gabriel, 1911)

Synonyms
- Turbonilla portseaensis Gatliff & Gabriel, 1911

Species of gastropod

Linopyrga portseaensis is a species of sea snail, a marine gastropod mollusk in the family Pyramidellidae, the pyrams and their allies.
