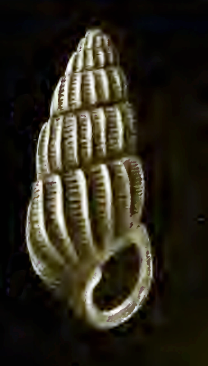
- Apertural view of a shell of Pyrgulina lecta

Scientific classification
- Kingdom: Animalia
- Phylum: Mollusca
- Class: Gastropoda
- Family: Pyramidellidae
- Genus: Pyrgulina
- Species: P. lecta

Binomial name
- Pyrgulina lecta (Dall & Bartsch, 1906)

Synonyms
- Odostomia (Pyrgulina) lecta Dall & Bartsch, 1906 (basionym)

= Pyrgulina lecta =

Species of gastropod

Pyrgulina alveata is a species of very small sea snail, a pyramidellid gastropod micromollusk. This genus is currently placed in the subfamily Chrysallidinae of the family Pyramidellidae.

== Description ==
The elongate-ovate shell is turreted, shouldered, sutures crenulated, shining, hyaline to milk-white. It measures 3.4 mm. The nuclear whorls moderately' large, deeply obliquely immersed in the first of the succeeding whorls, only the last half turn of the last volution is visible from the side. The six post-nuclear whorls are rather high between the sutures, somewhat flattened, the summit of the succeeding whorls falls a little anterior to the periphery of the preceding one. This gives the whorls a constricted appearance at the suture. The whorls are ornamented by strong sublamellar axial ribs, which are thickened and cuspid at the summit. Fourteen of these ribs occur upon the first, sixteen upon the third, and twenty upon the penultimate whorl. The intercostal spaces are broad and rounded, fully three times the width of the ribs, crossed by narrow, incised spiral lines, which are about one-fourth as wide as the space enclosed between them. Twelve of these lines occur between the sutures upon the fourth and penultimate whorls. The periphery and the base of the body whorl are well rounded, the latter attenuated. They are marked like the space between the sutures by the prominent continuations of the axial ribs and ten incised strong, spiral lines. The aperture is suboval. The columella is short, curved, reinforced by the attenuated base, provided with a strong, oblique fold near its insertion. The parietal wall is covered by a moderately thick callus, which extends over the umbilical area.

== Distribution ==
This species occurs in the Pacific Ocean off Japan.
