= Babella claudoni =

- Shell of Babella claudoni (original image)

Scientific classification
- Kingdom: Animalia
- Phylum: Mollusca
- Class: Gastropoda
- Family: Pyramidellidae
- Genus: Babella
- Species: B. claudoni

Binomial name
- Babella claudoni (Dautzenberg & H. Fischer, 1907)

Synonyms
- Numaegilina claudoni (Dautzenberg & H. Fischer, 1907); Pyrgulina claudoni Dautzenberg & H. Fischer, 1907 (original combination)

Species of gastropod

Babella claudoni is a species of sea snail, a marine gastropod mollusk in the family Pyramidellidae, the pyrams and their allies.

== Description ==
The length of the shell attains 2 mm, its diameter 1 mm.

(Original description in French) The shell is fairly glossy, solid, and imperforate, with an oval conoid shape. The spire is moderately elevated and consists of a smooth, heterostrophic embryonic whorl followed by four normal, slightly convex whorls, separated by a well-marked suture.

The surface is ornamented with strong, oblique longitudinal ribs, which are approximately equal in width to the spaces separating them. Numerous fine but clearly visible decurrent striae occur in the intercostal spaces. A decurrent funicle emerges from the suture between the last two whorls. On the body whorl, another decurrent funicle runs slightly below the periphery and is separated from the first by a rather pronounced groove. The base of the body whorl is concentrically striated, and a few radiating growth wrinkles are also visible.

The aperture is subquadrangular. The columella is slightly twisted and terminates above in a well-developed spiral fold. The outer lip is simple. The coloration is uniformly white.

== Distribution ==
This marine species occurs in the Pacific Ocean off the coast of Vietnam.
