= Pyrgulina cambodgiensis =

Scientific classification
- Kingdom: Animalia
- Phylum: Mollusca
- Class: Gastropoda
- Family: Pyramidellidae
- Genus: Pyrgulina
- Species: P. cambodgiensis

Binomial name
- Pyrgulina cambodgiensis Saurin, 1961

Synonyms
- Chrysallida (Pyrgulina) cambodgiensis (Saurin, 1961)

Species of gastropod

Pyrgulina cambodgiensis is a species of sea snail, a marine gastropod mollusk in the family Pyramidellidae, the pyrams, and their allies.

== Distribution ==
This marine species appears in the Gulf of Thailand.
