= Babella glycisma =

- Shell of Babella glycisma (original image)

Scientific classification
- Kingdom: Animalia
- Phylum: Mollusca
- Class: Gastropoda
- Family: Pyramidellidae
- Genus: Babella
- Species: B. glycisma

Binomial name
- Babella glycisma (Melvill, 1899)

Synonyms
- Egilina glycisma (Melvill, 1899) superseded combination; Pyrgulina (Egilina) glycisma Melvill, 1899 superseded combination; Pyrgulina glycisma Melvill, 1899 superseded combination

Species of gastropod

Babella glycisma is a species of sea snail, a marine gastropod mollusk in the family Pyramidellidae, the pyrams and their allies.

== Description ==
The length of the shell attains 3 mm, its diameter 1.25 mm.

(Original text in Latin) The shell is ovate, white, and compressed, with a globose, smooth, heterostrophic apex. It has 6½ whorls (including the 1½ apical whorls), which are impressed at the sutures and slightly stepped. They are closely and obliquely ribbed lengthwise, with smooth, rather thick, shining ribs, and finely spiral-striated interspaces. The body whorl is deeply spirally channelled at the periphery and radially ribbed. The aperture is ovate; the outer lip is simple and slightly thickened; the columella bears a single fold.

== Distribution ==
This marine species occurs in the Arabian Sea off the coast of the Karachi, Pakistan.
