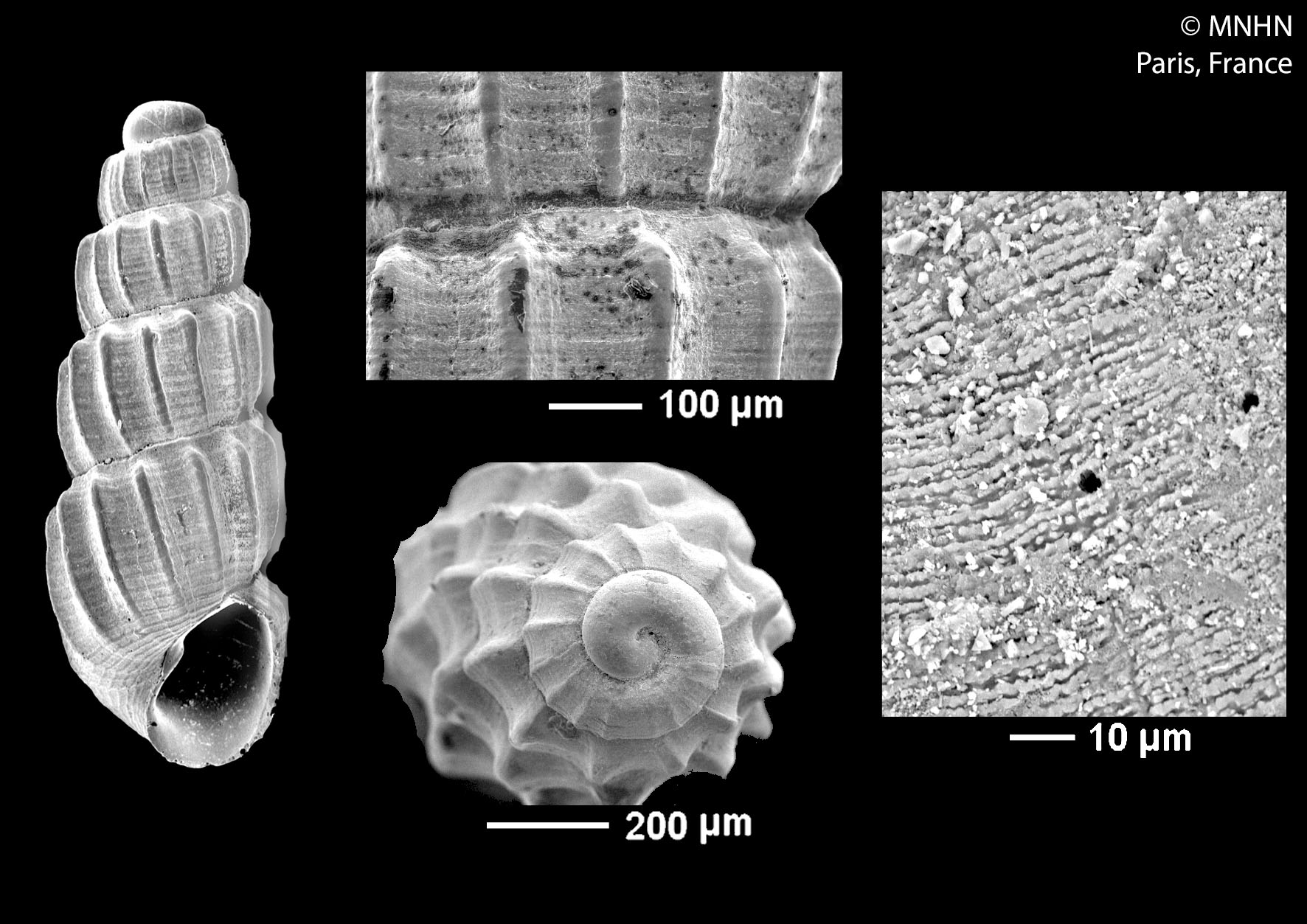
- Shell of Pyrgulina tenerrima (specimen at MNHN, Paris)

Scientific classification
- Kingdom: Animalia
- Phylum: Mollusca
- Class: Gastropoda
- Family: Pyramidellidae
- Genus: Pyrgulina
- Species: P. tenerrima

Binomial name
- Pyrgulina tenerrima (Melvill, 1906)

Synonyms
- Chrysallida (Pyrgulina) nigraerupis (Saurin, 1959); Odostomia (Pyrgulina) tenerrima Melvill, 1906 (basionym); Pyrgulina (Pyrgulina) tenerrima (Melvill, 1906); Pyrgulina nigraerupis Saurin, 1959; Turbonilla hortensia Thiele, 1925

= Pyrgulina tenerrima =

Species of gastropod

Pyrgulina tenerrima is a species of sea snail, a marine gastropod mollusk in the family Pyramidellidae, the pyrams and their allies.

== Distribution ==
This marine species occurs off Vietnam and in the Persian Gulf; also off the Solomon Islands.
