= Parthenina pagodula =

Scientific classification
- Kingdom: Animalia
- Phylum: Mollusca
- Class: Gastropoda
- Family: Pyramidellidae
- Genus: Parthenina
- Species: P. pagodula

Binomial name
- Parthenina pagodula (A. Adams, 1860)

Synonyms
- Parthenina monocycla (Yokoyama, 1922); Pselliogyra pagodula A. Adams, 1860; Turbonilla monocycla A. Adams, 1860

Species of mollusc

Parthenina pagodula is a species of sea snail, a marine gastropod mollusc in the family Pyramidellidae, the pyrams and their allies.
