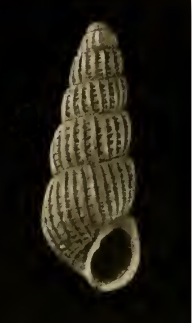
- Apertural view of Linopyrga tantilla

Scientific classification
- Kingdom: Animalia
- Phylum: Mollusca
- Class: Gastropoda
- Family: Pyramidellidae
- Genus: Linopyrga
- Species: L. tantilla

Binomial name
- Linopyrga tantilla (A. Adams, 1863)

Synonyms
- Odostomia (Trabecula) tantilla (A. Adams, 1863); Pyrgulina tantilla A. Adams, 1863 (basionym)

= Linopyrga tantilla =

Species of mollusc

Linopyrga tantilla is a species of sea snail, a marine gastropod mollusk in the family Pyramidellidae, the pyrams and their allies.

== Description ==
The small, slender shell measures 2.6 mm. It is turreted, milk-white. The nuclear whorls are small, strongly obliquely immersed in the first post-nuclear whorl, only a portion of the last solution is visible. The seven post-nuclear whorlsare strongly shouldered, moderately rounded, rather high between the sutures, and appearing somewhat constricted at this point. They are marked by strong, rounded, backward slanting axial ribs, which render the summits of the whorls firmly crenulate. Fourteen of these ribs occur upon the second, twenty-three upon the fourth, and thirty-two upon the penultimate whorl. The intercostal spaces are about twice as wide as the ribs, crossed between the sutures by five subequally spaced, raised spiral threads, the posterior one of which is a little further from the summit than it is from its adjacent fellow; it is also a little less strongly developed than the rest. The ribs and spiral threads thus form a series of meshes or reticulations. The periphery and base of the body whorl are well rounded, sculptured, like the spaces between the sutures, by the axial ribs which continue prominently to the narrow umbilicus, and six subequal and subequally spaced spiral threads, with an indication of a very weak seventh within the narrow umbilicus. The ovoid aperture is moderately large. The posterior angle is obtuse. The outer lip is strong. The columella is slender, decidedly curved, and somewhat revolute, with a prominent oblique fold near its insertion The parietal wall is covered by a very strong callus, which gives the periostracum a complete appearance.

== Distribution ==
This species occurs in the Pacific Ocean off Japan.
