= Pyrgulina anacra =

Scientific classification
- Kingdom: Animalia
- Phylum: Mollusca
- Class: Gastropoda
- Family: Pyramidellidae
- Genus: Pyrgulina
- Species: P. anacra

Binomial name
- Pyrgulina anacra Saurin, 1959

Synonyms
- Chrysallida (Pyrgulina) anacra (Saurin, 1959)

Species of gastropod

Pyrgulina anacra is a species of sea snail, a marine gastropod mollusk in the family Pyramidellidae, the pyrams and their allies.

== Distribution ==
This marine species occurs off Vietnam.
