= Pyrgulina jullieni =

Scientific classification
- Kingdom: Animalia
- Phylum: Mollusca
- Class: Gastropoda
- Family: Pyramidellidae
- Genus: Pyrgulina
- Species: P. jullieni

Binomial name
- Pyrgulina jullieni (Dautzenberg, 1912)

Synonyms
- Chrysallida jullieni (Dautzenberg, 1912); Pyrgulina givenchyi Dautzenberg, 1912

Species of gastropod

Pyrgulina jullieni is a species of sea snail, a marine gastropod mollusk in the family Pyramidellidae, the pyrams and their allies.
