= Pyrgulina noviportus =

Scientific classification
- Kingdom: Animalia
- Phylum: Mollusca
- Class: Gastropoda
- Family: Pyramidellidae
- Genus: Pyrgulina
- Species: P. noviportus

Binomial name
- Pyrgulina noviportus Saurin, 1961

Synonyms
- Chrysallida (Pyrgulina) noviportus (Saurin, 1961)

Species of gastropod

Pyrgulina noviportus is a species of sea snail, a marine gastropod mollusk in the family Pyramidellidae, the pyrams and their allies.

== Distribution ==
It occurs in the Gulf of Thailand.
