= Pyrgulina difficilis =

Scientific classification
- Kingdom: Animalia
- Phylum: Mollusca
- Class: Gastropoda
- Family: Pyramidellidae
- Genus: Pyrgulina
- Species: P. difficilis

Binomial name
- Pyrgulina difficilis Saurin, 1958

Synonyms
- Chrysallida (Pyrgulina) difficilis (Saurin, 1958)

Species of gastropod

Pyrgulina difficilis is a species of sea snail, a marine gastropod mollusk in the family Pyramidellidae, the pyrams and their allies.

== Distribution ==
This marine species occurs off Vietnam.
