= Parthenina suturalis =

Scientific classification
- Kingdom: Animalia
- Phylum: Mollusca
- Class: Gastropoda
- Family: Pyramidellidae
- Genus: Parthenina
- Species: P. suturalis

Binomial name
- Parthenina suturalis (Philippi, 1844)

Synonyms
- Chrysallida suturalis Philippi, 1844; Rissoa mamoi Aradas & Maggiore, 1844; Rissoa striata Philippi, 1836; Rissoa suturalis Philippi, 1844 (original combination)

Species of gastropod

Parthenina suturalis is a species of sea snail, a marine gastropod mollusk in the family Pyramidellidae, the pyrams and their allies.

== Distribution ==
This marine species occurs in the following locations:

- European waters (ERMS scope)
- Greek Exclusive Economic Zone
- Portuguese Exclusive Economic Zone
- Spanish Exclusive Economic Zone
- United Kingdom Exclusive Economic Zone
