= Egilina mariella =

Scientific classification
- Kingdom: Animalia
- Phylum: Mollusca
- Class: Gastropoda
- Family: Pyramidellidae
- Genus: Egilina
- Species: E. mariella

Binomial name
- Egilina mariella (A.Adams, 1860)

Synonyms
- Miralda mariella (A. Adams, 1860); Parthenia mariella A. Adams, 1860

Species of gastropod

Egilina mariella is a species of sea snail, a marine gastropod mollusk in the family Pyramidellidae, the pyrams and their allies.

== Description ==
The small, milk-white shell grows to a length of 2.0 mm. It is umbilicated, regularly conic with an obliquely truncated apex and deeply channeled sutures. The whorls of the protoconch are almost completely immersed in the first whorl of the teleoconch. Only half of the last volution projects above it. The four whorls of the teleoconch are flattened. They are marked by strong, very obliquely backward-slanting axial ribs, which are thickened at the summits and constricted a little below the summit, which renders the top of each rib beaded. Anteriorly the ribs are terminated by the posterior margin of the peripheral sulcus; here the ribs expand somewhat and almost fuse, and this expansion gives them a subnodulose effect at this point. The intercostal spaces are smooth, about as wide as the axial ribs, decidedly depressed in the middle—that is, between the bead at the summit and the nodules at the periphery. The periphery of the body whorl is deeply sulcate. The base of the shell is well rounded. It is marked by about nine spiral lirations, the posterior one of which is decidedly wider than the rest. The depressed spaces between the lirations are marked by fine axial threads. Both the spiral lirations and the spaces between them gradually diminish in width from the periphery to the umbilical area. The aperture is suboval The posterior angle is acute. The columella is strongly oblique, somewhat revolute, reinforced by the somewhat attenuated base and provided with a fairly strong oblique fold near its insertion. The parietal wall is covered by a thick callus, which gives the periostracum a continuous appearance. On the body whorl the first basal keel appears above the sutures, which is therefore not channeled like the sutures of the preceding whorls.

== Distribution ==
This species occurs in the Pacific Ocean off Japan and the Philippines.
