= Egilina gracilis =

Scientific classification
- Kingdom: Animalia
- Phylum: Mollusca
- Class: Gastropoda
- Family: Pyramidellidae
- Genus: Egilina
- Species: E. gracilis

Binomial name
- Egilina gracilis (Yokoyama, 1926)

Species of gastropod

Egilina gracilis is a species of sea snail, a marine gastropod mollusk in the family Pyramidellidae, the pyrams and their allies.

== Habitat ==
This species is found in the following habitats:

- Brackish
- Marine
