= Linopyrga feriarum =

Scientific classification
- Kingdom: Animalia
- Phylum: Mollusca
- Class: Gastropoda
- Family: Pyramidellidae
- Genus: Linopyrga
- Species: L. feriarum

Binomial name
- Linopyrga feriarum (Saurin, 1959)

Synonyms
- Chrysallida (Pyrgulina) feriarum (Saurin, 1959); Pyrgulina (Linopyrga) feriarum Saurin, 1959 (basionym); Pyrgulina feriarum Saurin, 1959

Species of gastropod

Linopyrga feriarum is a species of sea snail, a marine gastropod mollusk in the family Pyramidellidae, the pyrams and their allies.

== Distribution ==
This marine species occurs off Vietnam.
