= Chrysallida pura =

Scientific classification
- Kingdom: Animalia
- Phylum: Mollusca
- Class: Gastropoda
- Family: Pyramidellidae
- Genus: Chrysallida
- Species: C. pura

Binomial name
- Chrysallida pura (Saurin, 1961)

Synonyms
- Chrysallida (Pyrgulina) pura (Saurin, 1962); Pyrgulina (Partulida) pura Saurin, 1962; Pyrgulina pura Saurin, 1962 (original combination)

Species of gastropod

Chrysallida pura is a species of sea snail, a marine gastropod mollusk in the family Pyramidellidae, the pyrams and their allies.

== Distribution ==
This marine species occurs in the Gulf of Thailand
