= Linopyrga fannyae =

Scientific classification
- Kingdom: Animalia
- Phylum: Mollusca
- Class: Gastropoda
- Family: Pyramidellidae
- Genus: Linopyrga
- Species: L. fannyae

Binomial name
- Linopyrga fannyae (Saurin, 1959)

Synonyms
- Chrysallida (Pyrgulina) fannyae (Saurin, 1959); Pyrgulina (Linopyrga) fannyae Saurin, 1959 (basionym); Pyrgulina fannyae Saurin, 1959

Species of gastropod

Linopyrga fannyae is a species of sea snail, a marine gastropod mollusk in the family Pyramidellidae, the pyrams and their allies.

== Distribution ==
This marine species occurs off Vietnam.
