= Egilina callista =

Scientific classification
- Kingdom: Animalia
- Phylum: Mollusca
- Class: Gastropoda
- Family: Pyramidellidae
- Genus: Egilina
- Species: E. callisti

Binomial name
- Egilina callisti (Melvill, 1893)

Synonyms
- Babella bartschi (Dautzenberg & Fischer, 1907); Pyrgulina (Egilina) callista Melvill, 1893; Pyrgulina bartschi Dautzenberg & Fischer, 1907; Pyrgulina callista Mevill, 1893 (original combination); Pyrgulina perspectiva Hedley, 1902

Species of gastropod

Egilina callista is a species of sea snail, a marine gastropod mollusk in the family Pyramidellidae, the pyrams and their allies. The species is one of twelve known species within the Babella genus of Gastropods.
