= Parthenina angulosa =

Scientific classification
- Kingdom: Animalia
- Phylum: Mollusca
- Class: Gastropoda
- Family: Pyramidellidae
- Genus: Parthenina
- Species: P. angulosa

Binomial name
- Parthenina angulosa (Monterosato, 1889)

Synonyms
- Chrysallida angulosa (Monterosato, 1889); Pyrgulina angulosa Monterosato, 1889 (original combination)

Species of gastropod

Parthenina angulosa is a species of sea snail, a marine gastropod mollusk in the family Pyramidellidae, the pyrams and their allies.

== Distribution ==
This marine species occurs in the following locations:

- European waters (ERMS scope), formerly the Mediterranean Sea
- Portuguese Exclusive Economic Zone
- Spanish Exclusive Economic Zone
