= Linopyrga primitractus =

Scientific classification
- Kingdom: Animalia
- Phylum: Mollusca
- Class: Gastropoda
- Family: Pyramidellidae
- Genus: Linopyrga
- Species: L. primitractus

Binomial name
- Linopyrga primitractus (Saurin, 1959)

Synonyms
- Chrysallida (Pyrgulina) primitractus (Saurin, 1959); Pyrgulina (Linopygra) primitractus Saurin, 1959 (basionym); Pyrgulina primitractus Saurin, 1959

Species of gastropod

Linopyrga primitractus is a species of sea snail, a marine gastropod mollusk in the family Pyramidellidae, the pyrams and their allies.

== Distribution ==
This marine species occurs in the Gulf of Thailand and off Vietnam.
