= Parthenina affectuosa =

Scientific classification
- Kingdom: Animalia
- Phylum: Mollusca
- Class: Gastropoda
- Family: Pyramidellidae
- Genus: Parthenina
- Species: P. affectuosa

Binomial name
- Parthenina affectuosa (Yokoyama, 1927)

Synonyms
- Babella affectuosa(Yokoyama 1927); Egilina (Prestoniella) affectuosa (Yokoyama, 1927); Odostomia (Egilina) affectuosa Yokoyama, 1927; Turbonilla affectuosa (Yokoyama, 1927)

Species of gastropod

Parthenina affectuosa is a species of sea snail, a marine gastropod mollusk in the family Pyramidellidae, the pyrams and their allies.

== Description ==
The shell is approximately 4.7 millimeters in size.

== Distribution ==
This marine species occurs in seas near the coasts of the Philippines and surrounding minor islands.

== Habitat ==
This species is found in the following habitats:

- Brackish
- Marine
