= Parthenina monicae =

Scientific classification
- Kingdom: Animalia
- Phylum: Mollusca
- Class: Gastropoda
- Family: Pyramidellidae
- Genus: Parthenina
- Species: P. monicae

Binomial name
- Parthenina monicae (Saurin, 1958)

Synonyms
- Chrysallida (Pyrgulina) monicae (Saurin, 1958); Pyrgulina monicae Saurin, 1958; Pyrgulina (Parthenina) monicae Saurin, 1958

Species of gastropod

Parthenina monicae is a species of sea snail, a marine gastropod mollusc in the family Pyramidellidae, the pyrams and their allies.

== Distribution ==
This marine species occurs off Vietnam.
