= Babella cylindrica =

- Shell of Babella cylindrica (holotype at MNHN, Paris)

Scientific classification
- Kingdom: Animalia
- Phylum: Mollusca
- Class: Gastropoda
- Family: Pyramidellidae
- Genus: Babella
- Species: B. cylindrica

Binomial name
- Babella cylindrica Saurin, 1958

Synonyms
- Chrysallida (Babella) cylindrica (Saurin, 1958)

Species of gastropod

Babella cylindrica is a species of sea snail, a marine gastropod mollusk in the family Pyramidellidae, the pyrams and their allies. The species is one of twelve known species within the Babella genus of gastropods.

== Distribution ==
This marine species occurs in the Pacific Ocean off the coast of Vietnam.
