= Babella yabei =

Scientific classification
- Kingdom: Animalia
- Phylum: Mollusca
- Class: Gastropoda
- Family: Pyramidellidae
- Genus: Babella
- Species: B. yabei

Binomial name
- Babella yabei (Nomura, 1936)

Synonyms
- Chrysallida (Miralda) yabei Nomura, 1936; Egilina yabei (Nomura, 1936) (original combination)

Species of gastropod

Babella yabei is a species of sea snail, a marine gastropod mollusk in the family Pyramidellidae, the pyrams and their allies.

Subspecies

- Babella yabei permariella (Nomura, 1938)
- Babella yabei yabei (Nomura, 1936)

== Distribution ==
This marine species occurs off Japan.
