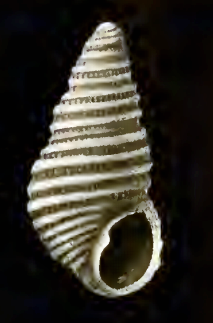
- Apertural view of the shell of Menestho felix

Scientific classification
- Kingdom: Animalia
- Phylum: Mollusca
- Class: Gastropoda
- Family: Pyramidellidae
- Tribe: Chrysallidini
- Genus: Menestho; Möller, 1842

Type species
- Menestho albula Fabricius, O., 1780

Species
- See text

Synonyms
- Odostomia (Menestho) Möller, 1842

= Menestho =

Genus of sea snails

Menestho is a genus of very small sea snails, pyramidellid gastropod mollusks, or micromollusks.

== Shell description ==
The original description by Möller (1842) is brief and in Latin: "Animal pede elongato, angusto; ore simplici, membrana linguali destituto; tentaculis brevioribus, crassiusculis, oculos perparvos ad basin internum ferentibus. Operculo pauco-spirato. Testa conico-turrita."

== Life habits ==
Little is known about the biology of the members of this genus. As is true of most members of the Pyramidellidae sensu lato, they are most likely to be ectoparasites.

== Species ==
Species within the genus Menestho include:

- Menestho acuminata Preston, 1908
- Menestho akkeshiensis Habe, 1958
- Menestho albula (Fabricius, 1780) (Type species) (as Turbo albulus)
- Menestho beermanae Jong & Coomans, 1988
- Menestho cingulitissima Nomura, 1937
- Menestho exaratissima (Dall & Bartsch, 1906)
- Menestho felix (Dall & Bartsch, 1906)
- Menestho hypocurta (Dall & Bartsch, 1909)
- Menestho kesennumensis Nomura, 1938
- Menestho kwantoensis Nomura, 1938
- Menestho sexsulcata Nomura, 1936
- Menestho shataii Nomura, 1936
- Menestho suavis Nomura, 1936
- Menestho truncatula (Odhner, 1915)

Species brought into synonymy

- Menestho amilda Dall & Bartsch, 1909: synonym of Odostomia amilda Dall & Bartsch, 1909
- Menestho beauforti Jacot, A.P., 1921: synonym of Boonea impressa (Say, T., 1822)
- Menestho chilensis Dall & Bartsch, 1909: synonym of Odostomia chilensis Dall & Bartsch, 1909
- Menestho cingulittissima [sic] : synonym of Menestho cingulitissima Nomura, 1937
- Menestho diaphana (Jeffreys, 1848): synonym of Ondina diaphana (Jeffreys, 1848)
- Menestho divisa (J. Adams, 1797): synonym of Ondina divisa (Adams J., 1797)
- Menestho dollfusi Locard, 1886: synonym of Euparthenia humboldti (Risso, 1826)
- Menestho exarata A. Adams, 1861: synonym of Menestho exaratissima (Dall & Bartsch, 1906)
- Menestho grijalvae (Baker, Hanna & Strong, 1928): synonym of Odostomia grijalvae Baker, Hanna & Strong, 1928
- Menestho humboldti (Risso, 1826): synonym of Euparthenia humboldti (Risso, 1826)
- Menestho morseana Bartsch, 1909: synonym of Menestho albula (Fabricius, 1780)
- Menestho tenuicula F. Nordsieck, 1972: synonym of Odostomia erjaveciana Brusina, 1869
