= Evalea =

- Shell of † Evalea melanella (specimen at MNHN, Paris)

Scientific classification
- Kingdom: Animalia
- Phylum: Mollusca
- Class: Gastropoda
- Family: Pyramidellidae
- Genus: Evalea; A. Adams, 1860

Type species
- Odostomia elegans A. Adams, 1860

Synonyms
- Odostomia (Evalea)

Genus of gastropods

Evalea is a genus of sea snails, marine gastropod mollusks in the family Pyramidellidae, the pyrams and their allies.

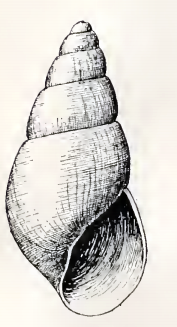
Evalea amchitkana

Evalea was assigned to Odostomia by Martin (1904); to Heterostrophia by Sepkoski (2002) and to Pyramidellidae by Wienrich and Janssen (2007)

== Species ==
Species within the genus Evalea include:

- Evalea amchitkana (Dall & Bartsch, 1909)
- Evalea carinae van Aartsen & Corgan, 1996
- Evalea eclecta (Pilsbry, 1918)
- Evalea elegans (A. Adams, 1860)
- Evalea emeryi (Bartsch, 1955)
- Evalea fernandina (Bartsch, 1927)
- Evalea liricincta (Suter, 1908)
- † Evalea melanella (I. Lea, 1833)
- Evalea plana Laws, 1941
- Evalea propria Laws, 1941
- Evalea ryclea (Bartsch, 1927)
- Evalea sabulosa (Suter, 1908)
- Evalea stocki Jong & Coomans, 1988
- Evalea waikikiensis (Pilsbry, 1918)

The following species were brought into synonymy:

- Evalea alleryi F. Nordsieck, 1972 : synonym of Ondina scandens (Monterosato, 1884)
- Evalea exigua F. Nordsieck, 1972: synonym of Ondina vitrea (Brusina, 1866)
- Evalea peasei (Dautzenberg & Bouge, 1933): synonym of Evalea eclecta (Pilsbry, 1918)
- Evalea pocahontasae Henderson, J.B. & P. Bartsch, 1914: synonym of Odostomia pocahontasae Henderson & Bartsch, 1914
- Evalea scandens (Monterosato, 1884): synonym of Ondina scandens (Monterosato, 1884)
- Evalea semiornata Folin, L. de, 1872: synonym of Ondina warreni (Thompson, W., 1845)
- Evalea spiridionae F. Nordsieck, 1972: synonym of Ondina vitrea (Brusina, 1866)
- Evalea subulata F. Nordsieck, 1972: synonym of Ondina scandens (Monterosato, 1884)
