= Odostomia turriculata =

Scientific classification
- Kingdom: Animalia
- Phylum: Mollusca
- Class: Gastropoda
- Family: Pyramidellidae
- Genus: Odostomia
- Species: O. turriculata

Binomial name
- Odostomia turriculata Monterosato, 1869

Species of gastropod

Odostomia turriculata is a species of sea snail, a marine gastropod mollusc in the family Pyramidellidae, the pyrams and their allies.

== Description ==
The length of the shell varies between 1.2 mm and 4 mm. Odostomia paardekooperi van Aartsen, Gittenberger & Goud, 1998 is very similar but Odostomia turriculata has flexuous and opisthocline growth lines and similar but larger embryonic whorls .

== Distribution ==
This species occurs in the following locations:

- European waters (ERMS scope)
- Greek Exclusive Economic Zone
- Portuguese Exclusive Economic Zone
- Spanish Exclusive Economic Zone
