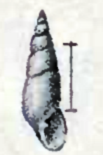
- Drawing of Odostomia bulimulus

Scientific classification
- Kingdom: Animalia
- Phylum: Mollusca
- Class: Gastropoda
- Family: Pyramidellidae
- Genus: Odostomia
- Species: O. bulimulus

Binomial name
- Odostomia bulimulus Monterosato, 1874

Synonyms
- Odostomia bulimoides Brugnone, G., 1873; Odostomia (Auristomia) bulimulus bulimulus Monterosato, 1874

= Odostomia bulimulus =

Species of gastropod

Odostomia bulimulus is a species of sea snail, a marine gastropod mollusc in the family Pyramidellidae, the pyrams and their allies.

== Description ==
The shell grows to a length of 5 mm. The thin shell is smooth and shining. There are six slightly convex whorls. The aperture is long and rather narrow, with a plicate tooth above.

== Distribution ==
This species occurs in the following locations:

- European waters (ERMS scope) : demersal zone of the Mediterranean Sea
