= E. exigua =

E. exigua may refer to:

- Eatoniella exigua, a sea snail
- Elachista exigua, a grass-miner moth
- Eleogiton exigua, a flowering plant
- Entodina exigua, a land snail
- Eolis exigua, a sea slug
- Eragrostis exigua, a true grass
- Eublemma exigua, an owlet moth
- Eucalyptus exigua, a flowering plant
- Eulechria exigua, a concealer moth
- Eulima exigua, a sea snail
- Euphorbia exigua, a flowering plant
- Evalea exigua, a sea snail
