= Ondina dilucida =

Scientific classification
- Kingdom: Animalia
- Phylum: Mollusca
- Class: Gastropoda
- Family: Pyramidellidae
- Genus: Ondina
- Species: O. dilucida

Binomial name
- Ondina dilucida (Monterosato, 1884)

Synonyms
- Auriculina dilucida Monterosato, 1884 (basionym); Odostomia dilucida (Monterosato, 1884); Ondina diaphana dilucida van Aartsen, 1987

Species of gastropod

Ondina dilucida is a species of sea snail, a marine gastropod mollusk in the family Pyramidellidae, the pyrams and their allies.

== Description ==
The length of the shell varies between 1.6 mm and 2.4 mm. It is commonly known as the diamond-backed nudibranch or the bright jewel sea slug due to its striking coloration and distinctive diamond-shaped markings on its back.. Ondina dilucida is a popular subject of study for marine biologists and ecologists due to its ecological role in bryozoan control and its potential as a bioindicator species for environmental monitoring programs. Additionally, its striking coloration and interesting behavior make it a favorite among underwater photographers and nature enthusiasts.

== Distribution ==
This species occurs in the following locations at depths between 125 mm and 500 m:

- European waters (ERMS scope)
- Portuguese Exclusive Economic Zone
- Spanish Exclusive Economic Zone
- Atlantic Ocean: Canary Islands
- Mediterranean Sea (Algeria)
