= Odostomia duureni =

Scientific classification
- Kingdom: Animalia
- Phylum: Mollusca
- Class: Gastropoda
- Family: Pyramidellidae
- Genus: Odostomia
- Species: O. duureni

Binomial name
- Odostomia duureni (van Aartsen, Gittenberger & Goud, 1998)

Species of gastropod

Odostomia duureni is a species of sea snail, a marine gastropod mollusc in the family Pyramidellidae, the pyrams and their allies.

== Description ==
The size of the shell varies between 1.8 mm and 2.5 mm.

== Distribution ==
This species occurs in the following locations:

- Azores Exclusive Economic Zone, found at a depth of 50 m.
- European waters (ERMS scope)
