= Odostomia lesuroiti =

Scientific classification
- Kingdom: Animalia
- Phylum: Mollusca
- Class: Gastropoda
- Family: Pyramidellidae
- Genus: Odostomia
- Species: O. lesuroiti

Binomial name
- Odostomia lesuroiti Peñas & Rolán, 1999

Species of gastropod

Odostomia lesuroiti is a species of sea snail, a marine gastropod mollusc in the family Pyramidellidae, the pyrams and their allies.

== Distribution ==
This species occurs in the following locations:

- European waters (ERMS scope)

== Notes ==
Additional information regarding this species:

- Habitat: Known from seamounts and knolls
