= Odostomia microeques =

Scientific classification
- Kingdom: Animalia
- Phylum: Mollusca
- Class: Gastropoda
- Family: Pyramidellidae
- Genus: Odostomia
- Species: O. microeques

Binomial name
- Odostomia microeques Rolán & Templado in Peñas & Rolán, 1999

Species of gastropod

Odostomia microeques is a species of sea snail, a marine gastropod mollusc in the family Pyramidellidae, the pyrams and their allies.

== Description ==
The shell grows to a length of 1 mm.

== Distribution ==
This species occurs in the following locations:

- European waters (ERMS scope) : Madeira
