= Ondina normani =

Scientific classification
- Kingdom: Animalia
- Phylum: Mollusca
- Class: Gastropoda
- Family: Pyramidellidae
- Genus: Ondina
- Species: O. normani

Binomial name
- Ondina normani (Friele, 1886)

Synonyms
- Odostomia normani Friele, 1886 (basionym); Toledonia normani (Friele, 1886)

Species of gastropod

Ondina normani is a species of sea snail, a marine gastropod mollusk in the family Pyramidellidae, the pyrams and their allies.

== Distribution ==
This species occurs in the following locations:

- European waters (ERMS scope)
- Arctic seas
- United Kingdom Exclusive Economic Zone
