= Odostomia suboblonga =

Scientific classification
- Kingdom: Animalia
- Phylum: Mollusca
- Class: Gastropoda
- Family: Pyramidellidae
- Genus: Odostomia
- Species: O. suboblonga

Binomial name
- Odostomia suboblonga Jeffreys, 1884

Synonyms
- Odostomia fallax Monterosato, T.A. de M. di, 1875 (nomen nudum)

Species of gastropod

Odostomia suboblonga is a species of sea snail, a marine gastropod mollusk in the family Pyramidellidae, the pyrams and their allies.

== Description ==
The shell boasts a turbinate shape, with a notably smooth white exterior and curved aperture. The size of an adult shell varies between 1.9 mm and 3 mm.

== Distribution ==
This species occurs in the following locations:

- Canary Islands
- Cape Verde
- Europe
- European waters (ERMS scope)
- Madeira
- Central Mediterranean Sea
- Morocco
- Portuguese Exclusive Economic Zone
- Spanish Exclusive Economic Zone
- United Kingdom Exclusive Economic Zone
