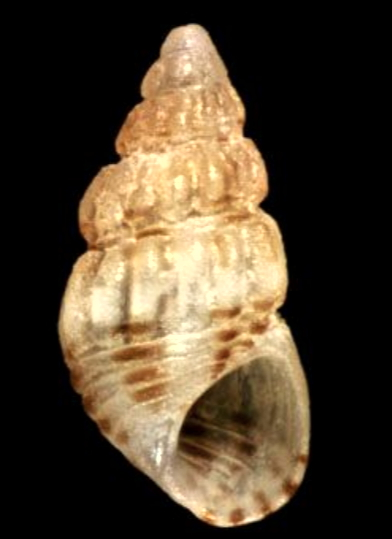
- Shell of Alvania algeriana (specimen at the Natural History Museum, Rotterdam)

Scientific classification
- Kingdom: Animalia
- Phylum: Mollusca
- Class: Gastropoda
- Subclass: Caenogastropoda
- Order: Littorinimorpha
- Superfamily: Rissooidea
- Family: Rissoidae
- Genus: Alvania
- Species: A. algeriana

Binomial name
- Alvania algeriana (Monterosato, 1877)

Synonyms
- Rissoa algeriana Monterosato, 1877

= Alvania algeriana =

Species of gastropod

Alvania algeriana is a species of minute sea snail, a marine gastropod mollusk or micromollusk in the family Rissoidae.

== Description ==
The length of the shell attains 3 mm to 4.7 mm.

The shell is imperforate. It has rounded longitudinal ribs and about equal interspaces. it is yellowish brown, with a brown subsutural band and three more on the base. The lip is simple and sharp.

== Distribution ==
This species occurs in the Mediterranean Sea off Algeria, Tunisia and southern Corsica
