= Auristomia ignorata =

Scientific classification
- Kingdom: Animalia
- Phylum: Mollusca
- Class: Gastropoda
- Family: Pyramidellidae
- Genus: Auristomia
- Species: A. ignorata

Binomial name
- Auristomia ignorata (Monterosato, 1917)

Synonyms
- Odostomia (Auristomia) bulimulus ignorata Monterosato, 1917; Auristomia ignorata Monterosato, 1917

Species of sea snail

Auristomia ignorata is a species of small sea snail, a marine gastropod mollusk in the family Pyramidellidae, the pyrams and their allies.

== Description ==
The shell of Auristomia ignorata is small, typically reaching between 3 mm and 6 mm in length. Like many members of the genus Odostomia, the shell is ovate-conic, smooth, and usually white or translucent.

The protoconch is small and deeply immersed in the first of the teleoconch whorls. The teleoconch consists of several slightly convex whorls with a distinct suture. The aperture is oval, and the columella typically bears a single, small, often internal fold (tooth) which is a defining characteristic of the family Pyramidellidae.

== Taxonomy ==
The species was originally described by the Italian malacologist Marquis di Monterosato in 1917 as a subspecies of Odostomia bulimulus. While historically debated, current malacological databases such as the World Register of Marine Species (WoRMS) recognize it as a distinct species.

== Distribution ==
This species is primarily found in the Mediterranean Sea, specifically off the coasts of Italy and the surrounding European waters. It is typically found in benthic habitats within the neritic zone.
