= Odostomia fehrae =

Scientific classification
- Kingdom: Animalia
- Phylum: Mollusca
- Class: Gastropoda
- Family: Pyramidellidae
- Genus: Odostomia
- Species: O. fehrae

Binomial name
- Odostomia fehrae (van Aartsen, Gittenberger & Goud, 1998)

Synonyms
- Odostomia (Pyramistomia) fehrae (van Aartsen, Gittenberger & Goud, 1998)

Species of gastropod

Odostomia fehrae is a species of sea snail, a marine gastropod mollusc in the family Pyramidellidae, the pyrams and their allies.

== Description ==
The size of the shell ranges from 1.7 mm to 1.9 mm.

== Distribution ==
This species occurs in the following locations:

- European waters (ERMS scope)
- Southeast North Atlantic Ocean
- Azores.

== Notes ==
Additional information regarding this species:

- Habitat: Known from seamounts and knolls
