= Turbonilla paucistriata =

Scientific classification
- Kingdom: Animalia
- Phylum: Mollusca
- Class: Gastropoda
- Family: Pyramidellidae
- Genus: Turbonilla
- Species: T. paucistriata

Binomial name
- Turbonilla paucistriata (Jeffreys, 1884)

Synonyms
- Odostomia paucistriata Jeffreys, 1884

Species of gastropod

Turbonilla paucistriata is a species of sea snail, a marine gastropod mollusk in the family Pyramidellidae, the pyrams and their allies.

== Distribution ==
This species occurs in the following locations:

- European waters (ERMS scope)
- Portuguese Exclusive Economic Zone
- Spanish Exclusive Economic Zone
