= Turbonilla micans =

Scientific classification
- Kingdom: Animalia
- Phylum: Mollusca
- Class: Gastropoda
- Family: Pyramidellidae
- Genus: Turbonilla
- Species: T. micans

Binomial name
- Turbonilla micans (Monterosato, 1875)

Synonyms
- Odostomia (Turbonilla) micans Monterosato, 1875; Odostomia attenuata Jeffreys, 1884; Odostomia micans Monterosato, 1875; Turbonilla attenuata (Jeffreys, 1884)

Species of gastropod

Turbonilla micans is a species of sea snail, a marine gastropod mollusk in the family Pyramidellidae, the pyrams and their allies.

== Distribution ==
This marine species occurs in the following locations:

- European waters (ERMS scope)
- Portuguese Exclusive Economic Zone
- Spanish Exclusive Economic Zone

== Notes ==
Additional information regarding this species:

- Habitat: Known from seamounts and knolls
