= Odostomia clavulina =

Scientific classification
- Kingdom: Animalia
- Phylum: Mollusca
- Class: Gastropoda
- Family: Pyramidellidae
- Genus: Odostomia
- Species: O. clavulina

Binomial name
- Odostomia clavulina P. Fischer, 1877

Synonyms
- Odostomia (Auristomia) clavulina Fischer P., 1877

Species of gastropod

Odostomia clavulina is a species of sea snail, a marine gastropod mollusc in the family Pyramidellidae, the pyrams and their allies.

== Description ==
The shell grows to a length of 2 mm.

== Distribution ==
This species occurs in the following locations:

- European waters (ERMS scope)
- United Kingdom Exclusive Economic Zone
- the Mediterranean Sea
- the Azores
