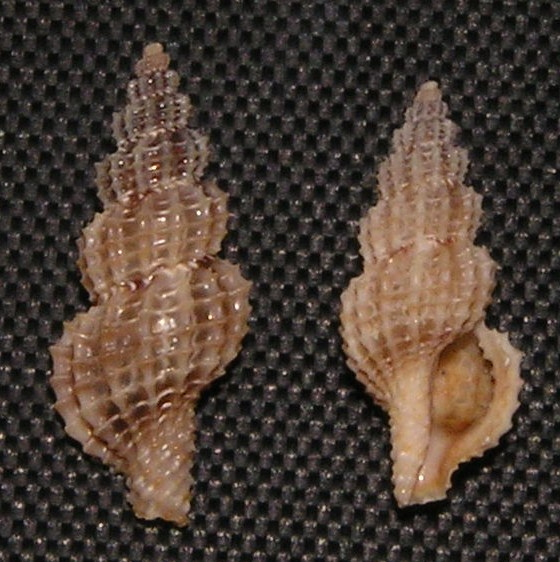
- Shell of Raphitoma horrida

Scientific classification
- Kingdom: Animalia
- Phylum: Mollusca
- Class: Gastropoda
- Subclass: Caenogastropoda
- Order: Neogastropoda
- Superfamily: Conoidea
- Family: Raphitomidae
- Genus: Raphitoma
- Species: R. horrida

Binomial name
- Raphitoma horrida (Monterosato, 1884)

Synonyms
- Clathurella cordieri var. pungens Bucquoy, Dautzenberg & Dollfus, 1883; Philbertia horrida elongata (var.) Locard, E.A.A. & E. Caziot, 1900; Philbertia horrida minor (var.) Locard, E.A.A. & E. Caziot, 1900; Philbertia horrida ventricosa (var.) Locard, E.A.A. & E. Caziot, 1900; Cordieria horrida Monterosato, 1884; Pleurotoma echinata Calcara P., 1839 (renamed); Raphitoma cordieri Bucquoy, Dautzenberg & Dollfus, 1883; Raphitoma pungens Monterosato, T.A. de M. di, 1884 (renamed); Raphitoma (Cyrtoides) monterosatoi Nordsieck, F., 1977

= Raphitoma horrida =

Species of gastropod

Raphitoma horrida is a species of sea snail, a marine gastropod mollusk in the family Raphitomidae.

== Description ==
The length of the shell reaches 13 mm.

== Distribution ==
This species occurs in the Mediterranean Sea.
