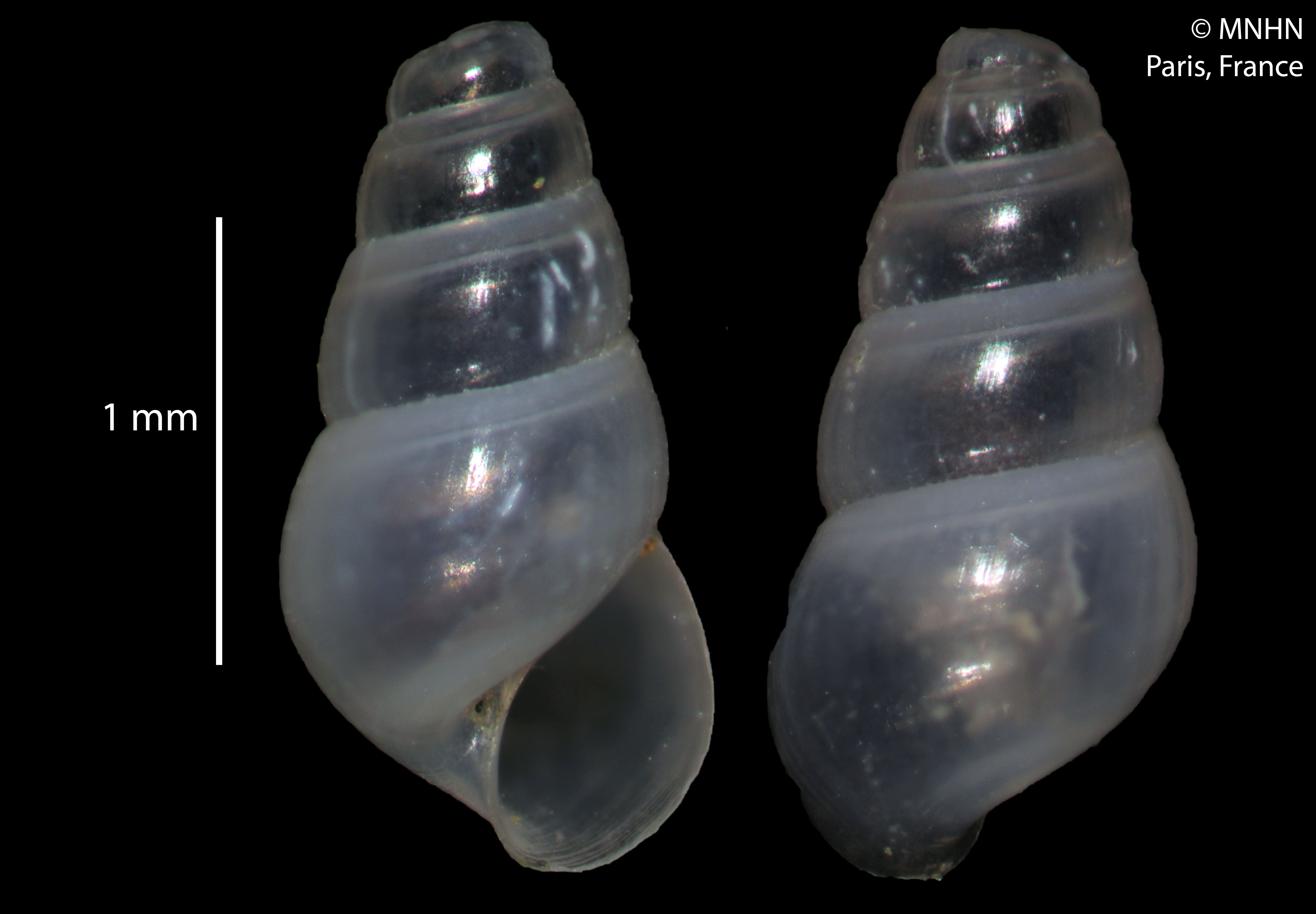
- Shell of Liostomia afzelii (paratype at MNHN, Paris)

Scientific classification
- Kingdom: Animalia
- Phylum: Mollusca
- Class: Gastropoda
- Family: Pyramidellidae
- Genus: Liostomia
- Species: L. afzelii

Binomial name
- Liostomia afzelii Warén, 1991

Synonyms
- Liostomia afzelli Warén, 1991

= Liostomia afzelii =

Species of gastropod

Liostomia afzelii is a species of sea snail, a marine gastropod mollusk in the family Pyramidellidae, the pyrams and their allies.

== Distribution ==
This species occurs in the following locations:

- European waters (ERMS scope)
- United Kingdom Exclusive Economic Zone
