= Turbonilla hoeki =

Scientific classification
- Kingdom: Animalia
- Phylum: Mollusca
- Class: Gastropoda
- Family: Pyramidellidae
- Genus: Turbonilla
- Species: T. hoeki

Binomial name
- Turbonilla hoeki Dautzenberg & Fischer H., 1896

Synonyms
- Turbonilla (Turbonilla) hoeki Dautzenberg & Fischer H., (1896)

Species of gastropod

Turbonilla hoeki is a species of sea snail, a marine gastropod mollusc in the family Pyramidellidae, the pyrams and their allies.

This species is also known under the name “Turbonilla hoecki” is misspelling.

== Description ==
The shell grows to a length of 7.5 mm

== Distribution ==
This species occurs in the following locations:

- European waters (ERMS scope) : France
- Atlantic Ocean : the Azores

== Notes ==
Additional information regarding this species:

- Habitat: Known from seamounts and knolls
