= Ondina modiola =

Scientific classification
- Kingdom: Animalia
- Phylum: Mollusca
- Class: Gastropoda
- Family: Pyramidellidae
- Genus: Ondina
- Species: O. modiola

Binomial name
- Ondina modiola (Monterosato, 1884)

Synonyms
- Auriculina modiola Monterosato 1884 (basionym)

Species of gastropod

Ondina modiola is a species of sea snail, a marine gastropod mollusk in the family Pyramidellidae, the pyrams and their allies. It was originally described as Auriculina modiola in 1884 by Italian malacologist Tommaso Di Maria Allery Monterosato.

== Description ==
The shell is glassy and translucent, with a dotted and sometimes striped spiral structure, and reaches a length of 2 mm. The columellar fold is almost absent and the inner edge of the columella is folded over the umbilical rim. Monterosato wrote of it consisting of "3 ½ recesses, descending, compressed, finely striated" and the original publication of the species described them as "elegant and rare shells." It is most likely a simultaneous hermaphrodite.

== Distribution ==
This species occurs in the Western Mediterranean Sea (Sicily, Spain). It is found in coastal areas and occasionally muddy sediment and coral zones. Ondina modiola is known to occur around the Magnisi Peninsula in Sicily.
