= Turbonilla nofronii =

Scientific classification
- Kingdom: Animalia
- Phylum: Mollusca
- Class: Gastropoda
- Family: Pyramidellidae
- Genus: Turbonilla
- Species: T. nofronii

Binomial name
- Turbonilla nofronii Peñas & Rolán, 1997

Species of gastropod

Turbonilla nofronii is a species of sea snail, a marine gastropod mollusk in the family Pyramidellidae, the pyrams and their allies.

== Distribution ==
This marine species occurs in the following locations:

- European waters (ERMS scope)
- off Morocco.
