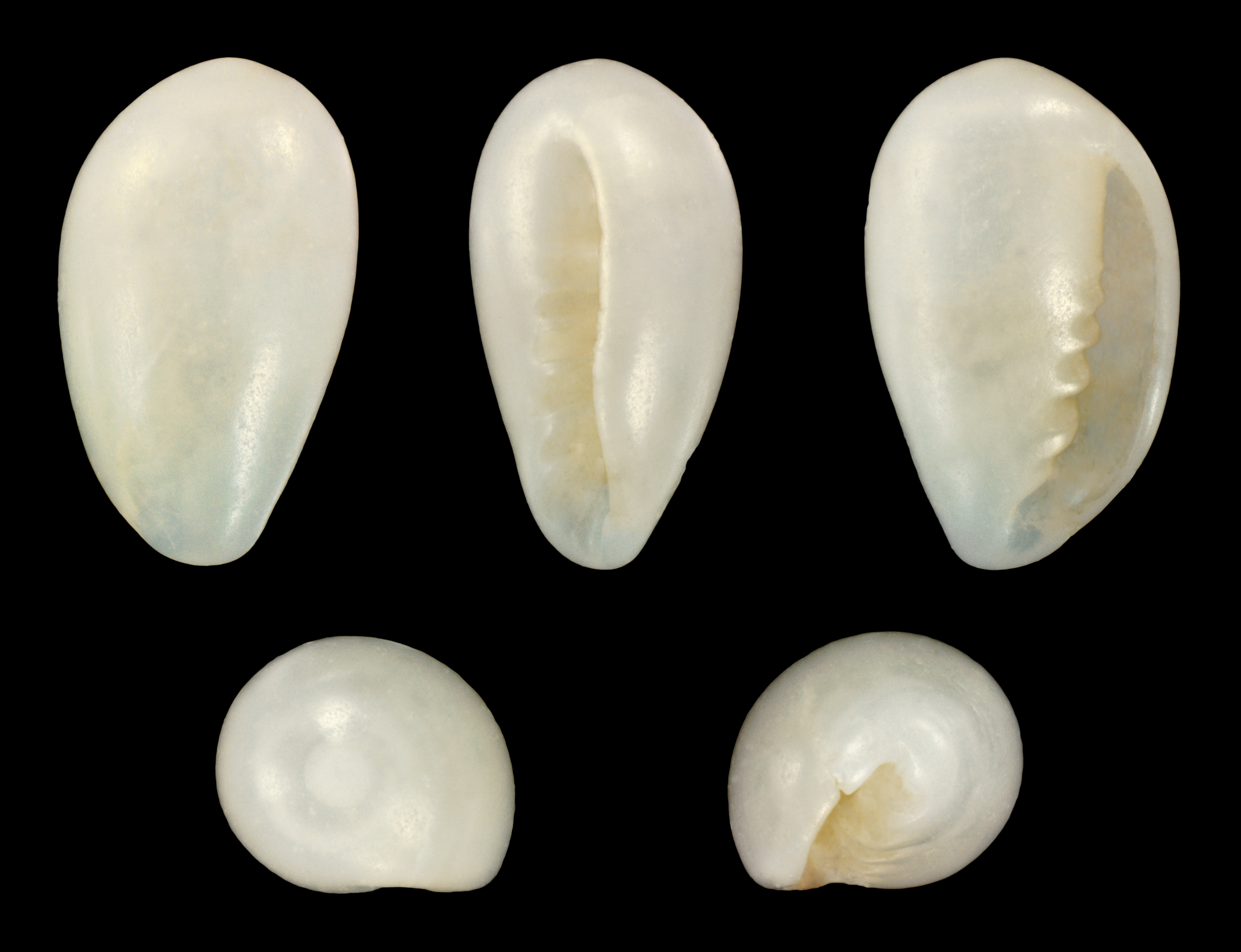

Scientific classification
- Kingdom: Animalia
- Phylum: Mollusca
- Class: Gastropoda
- Subclass: Caenogastropoda
- Order: Neogastropoda
- Family: Cystiscidae
- Subfamily: Cystiscinae
- Genus: Gibberula
- Species: G. philippii

Binomial name
- Gibberula philippii (Monterosato, 1878)

Synonyms
- Marginella minuta Philippi, 1844; Marginella philippii Monterosato, 1878

= Gibberula philippii =

Species of gastropod

Gibberula philippii is a species of very small sea snail, a marine gastropod mollusk or micromollusk in the family Cystiscidae.
