= Turbonilla multilirata =

Scientific classification
- Kingdom: Animalia
- Phylum: Mollusca
- Class: Gastropoda
- Family: Pyramidellidae
- Genus: Turbonilla
- Species: T. multilirata

Binomial name
- Turbonilla multilirata (Monterosato, 1875)

Synonyms
- Turbonilla (Striarcana) multilirata (Monterosato, 1875)

Species of gastropod

Turbonilla multilirata is a species of sea snail, a marine gastropod mollusk in the family Pyramidellidae, the pyrams and their allies.

== Description ==
The length of the shell varies between 4 mm and 6.5 mm. Has a spiral over its whole shell.

== Distribution ==
This species occurs in the following locations:

- European waters (ERMS scope)
- Portuguese Exclusive Economic Zone
- Spanish Exclusive Economic Zone
- United Kingdom Exclusive Economic Zone
- Mediterranean Sea
