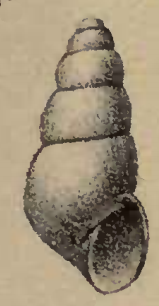
- Drawing of a shell of Liostomia clavula

Scientific classification
- Kingdom: Animalia
- Phylum: Mollusca
- Class: Gastropoda
- Family: Pyramidellidae
- Genus: Liostomia
- Species: L. clavula

Binomial name
- Liostomia clavula (Lovén, 1846)

Synonyms
- Eulimella clavula Lovén, 1846 (basionym)

= Liostomia clavula =

Species of gastropod

Liostomia clavula is a species of sea snail, a marine gastropod mollusc in the family Pyramidellidae, the pyrams and their allies.

== Description ==
The thin, white shell is transparent and polished. Its length measures 2.5 mm. The surface is microscopically longitudinally striated. The 4-5 whorls of the teleoconch are rather convex. The suture is slightly margined. The umbilicus is very small and narrow, but distinct. The columella has a barely discernible tooth or fold.

== Distribution ==
This species occurs in the following locations:

- European waters (ERMS scope)
- United Kingdom Exclusive Economic Zone
- Greek Exclusive Economic Zone
- Scandinavia
- North and Central Atlantic Ocean.

== Notes ==
Additional information regarding this species:

- Spelling: Liostomia clavulus in ERMS 1.0
