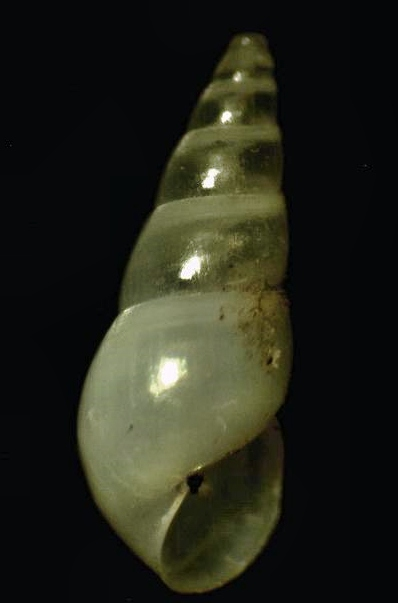
- Shell of Auristomia fusulus

Scientific classification
- Kingdom: Animalia
- Phylum: Mollusca
- Class: Gastropoda
- Family: Pyramidellidae
- Genus: Auristomia; Monterosato, 1884

Type species
- Odostomia erjaveciana Brusina, 1869

Synonyms
- Odontostomia (Auristomia) Monterosato, 1884; Odostomia (Auristomia) Monterosato, 1884

= Auristomia =

Genus of gastropods

Auristomia is a genus of sea snails, marine gastropod mollusks in the family Pyramidellidae, the pyrams and their allies.

== Species ==
Species within the genus Auristomia include:

- Auristomia barashi (Bogi & Galil, 2000)
- Auristomia erjaveciana (Brusina, 1869)
- Auristomia fusulus (Monterosato, 1878)
- Auristomia ignorata Monterosato, 1917
- Auristomia nofronii (Buzzurro, 2002)
- Auristomia rutor (Nofroni & Schander, 1994)

Possibly also:

- Odostomia (Auristomia) pyxidata Schander, 1994

=== Fossil species ===
- Auristomia gagliniae Tringali, 1999
