= Auristomia rutor =

Scientific classification
- Kingdom: Animalia
- Phylum: Mollusca
- Class: Gastropoda
- Family: Pyramidellidae
- Genus: Auristomia
- Species: A. rutor

Binomial name
- Auristomia rutor (Nofroni & Schander, 1994)

Synonyms
- Odostomia rutor (Nofroni, I. & C. Schander, 1994)

Species of gastropod

Auristomia rutor is a species of sea snail, a marine gastropod mollusk in the family Pyramidellidae, the pyrams and their allies.

== Description ==
The length of the shell attains 2.5 mm.

== Distribution ==
This species occurs in the following locations:

- European waters (ERMS scope)
- Portuguese Exclusive Economic Zone
- Spanish Exclusive Economic Zone
- off Algeria and Morocco.
