= Odostomia aartseni =

Scientific classification
- Kingdom: Animalia
- Phylum: Mollusca
- Class: Gastropoda
- Family: Pyramidellidae
- Genus: Odostomia
- Species: O. aartseni

Binomial name
- Odostomia aartseni Nofroni, 1988

Species of gastropod

Odostomia aartseni is a species of sea snail, a marine gastropod mollusc in the family Pyramidellidae, the pyrams and their allies.

== Distribution ==
This species occurs in the following locations:

- European waters (ERMS scope) : Mediterranean Sea.
