= Odostomia oblongula =

Scientific classification
- Kingdom: Animalia
- Phylum: Mollusca
- Class: Gastropoda
- Family: Pyramidellidae
- Genus: Odostomia
- Species: O. oblongula

Binomial name
- Odostomia oblongula Marshall, 1895

Synonyms
- Odostomia oblongula var. ovata Marshall, 1895

Species of gastropod

Odostomia oblongula is a species of sea snail, a marine gastropod mollusc in the family Pyramidellidae, the pyrams and their allies.

== Distribution ==
This species occurs in the following locations:

- European waters (ERMS scope)
- United Kingdom Exclusive Economic Zone
