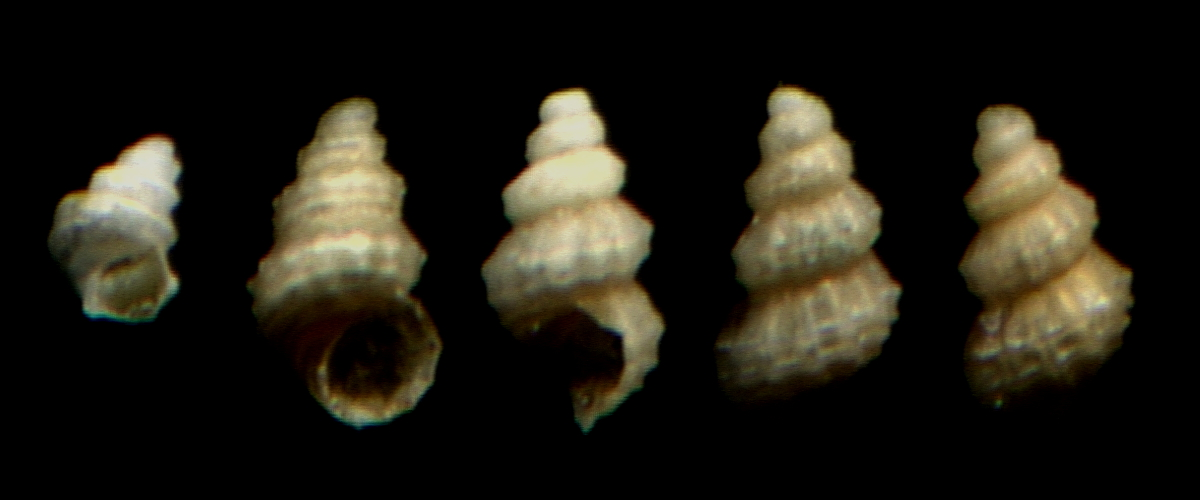
- Shell of Alvania subareolata

Scientific classification
- Kingdom: Animalia
- Phylum: Mollusca
- Class: Gastropoda
- Subclass: Caenogastropoda
- Order: Littorinimorpha
- Superfamily: Rissooidea
- Family: Rissoidae
- Genus: Alvania
- Species: A. subareolata

Binomial name
- Alvania subareolata Monterosato, 1869

Synonyms
- Alvania trinacriae Oberling, 1970 junior subjective synonym; Rissoa (Alcidia) ignorata Pallary, 1920 junior subjective synonym; Rissoa ignorata Pallary, 1920 ·

= Alvania subareolata =

Species of gastropod

Alvania subareolata is a species of minute sea snail, a marine gastropod mollusk or micromollusk in the family Rissoidae.

== Description ==
The length of the shell varies between 1.8 mm and 3 mm.

The shell is imperforate, translucent and brownish. It is subclathrate by longitudinal riblets crossed by spiral lirae. The shell contains five convex whorls with a deep suture. The columella is arcuate. The basal area is cingulate. The outer lip is thickened externally.

== Distribution ==
This species occurs in the Mediterranean Sea off Sicily, Greece and in the Strait of Gibraltar
