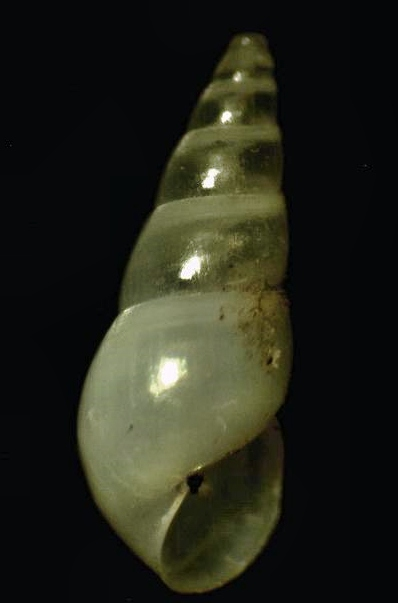

Scientific classification
- Kingdom: Animalia
- Phylum: Mollusca
- Class: Gastropoda
- Family: Pyramidellidae
- Genus: Auristomia
- Species: A. fusulus

Binomial name
- Auristomia fusulus ( Monterosato, 1878)

Synonyms
- Odostomia (Auriculina) fusulus Monterosato, 1878; Odostomia fusulus Monterosato, 1878

= Auristomia fusulus =

Species of gastropod

Auristomia fusulus is a species of sea snail, a marine gastropod mollusk in the family Pyramidellidae, the pyrams and their allies.

== Description ==
The shell grows to a length of 2.5 mm.

== Distribution ==
This species occurs in the following locations:

- European waters (ERMS scope) : Western Mediterranean Sea
- Portuguese Exclusive Economic Zone (EEZ)
- Spanish Exclusive Economic Zone (EEZ)
- Atlantic Ocean from the Bay of Biscay to Algeria
