= Ondina perezi =

Scientific classification
- Kingdom: Animalia
- Phylum: Mollusca
- Class: Gastropoda
- Family: Pyramidellidae
- Genus: Ondina
- Species: O. perezi

Binomial name
- Ondina perezi (Dautzenberg & Fisher, 1925)

Species of gastropod

Ondina perezi is a species of marine animal, more specifically a sea snail.

== Description ==
Has a dull, small, and slender shell ranging in size form 2.5mm to 2.9mm with flatter and less convex whorls than Ondina diaphana

== Distribution ==
This species occurs in the following locations:

- United Kingdom Exclusive Economic Zone, Faroes
- European waters : from Southern Sweden to Northern France.
