= Turbonilla macandreae =

Scientific classification
- Kingdom: Animalia
- Phylum: Mollusca
- Class: Gastropoda
- Family: Pyramidellidae
- Genus: Turbonilla
- Species: T. macandreae

Binomial name
- Turbonilla macandreae (Adams H., 1871)

Synonyms
- Turbonilla speciosa H. Adams, 1869 (non A. Adams, 1860)

Species of gastropod

Turbonilla macandreae is a species of sea snail, a marine gastropod mollusk in the family Pyramidellidae, the pyrams and their allies.

== Nomenclature ==
Replacement name for Turbonilla speciosa H. Adams, 1869, not A. Adams, 1860

== Distribution ==
This species occurs in the following locations:

- European waters (ERMS scope)
