= Turbonilla subulina =

Scientific classification
- Kingdom: Animalia
- Phylum: Mollusca
- Class: Gastropoda
- Family: Pyramidellidae
- Genus: Turbonilla
- Species: T. subulina

Binomial name
- Turbonilla subulina Monterosato, 1889

Synonyms
- Turbonilla bedoti Dautzenberg, 1912; Turbonilla hannoni Pallary, 1920; Turbonilla obliquecostata Dautzenberg, 1912

Species of gastropod

Turbonilla subulina is a species of sea snail, a marine gastropod mollusk in the family Pyramidellidae, the pyrams and their allies.

== Distribution ==
This species occurs in the following locations:

- European waters (ERMS scope)
