= Turbonilla gofasi =

Scientific classification
- Kingdom: Animalia
- Phylum: Mollusca
- Class: Gastropoda
- Family: Pyramidellidae
- Genus: Turbonilla
- Species: T. gofasi

Binomial name
- Turbonilla gofasi Peñas & Rolán, 1999

Synonyms
- Turbonilla gofasi (Peñas & Rolán, 1999)

Species of gastropod

Turbonilla gofasi is a species of sea snail, a marine gastropod mollusk in the family Pyramidellidae, the pyrams and their allies.

== Distribution ==
This species occurs in the following locations:

- European waters (ERMS scope)

== Notes ==
Additional information regarding this species:

- Habitat: Known from seamounts and knolls
