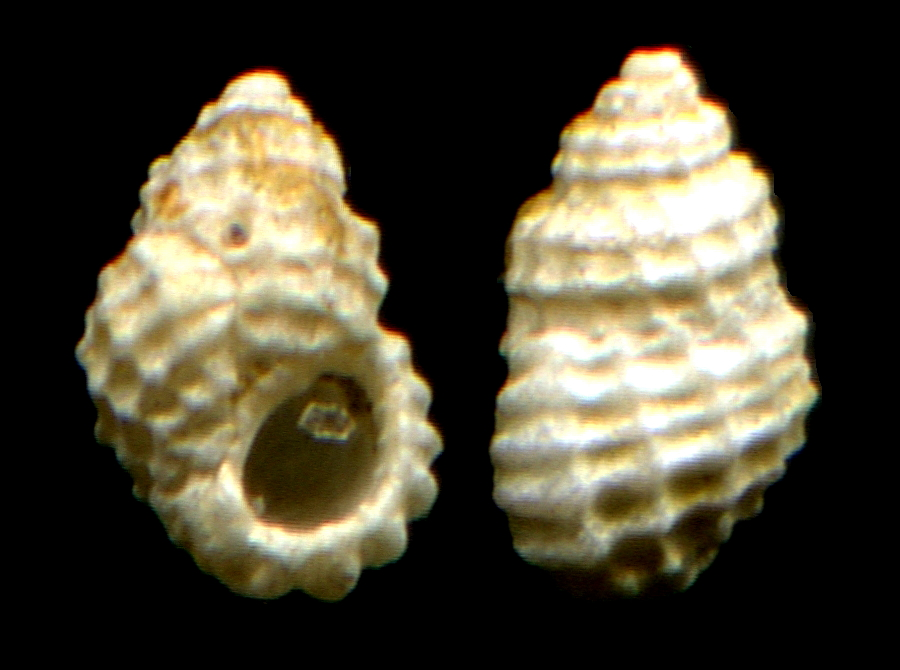
- Shell of Alvania hirta

Scientific classification
- Kingdom: Animalia
- Phylum: Mollusca
- Class: Gastropoda
- Subclass: Caenogastropoda
- Order: Littorinimorpha
- Superfamily: Rissooidea
- Family: Rissoidae
- Genus: Alvania
- Species: A. hirta

Binomial name
- Alvania hirta (Monterosato, 1884)

Synonyms
- Acinopsis hirta Monterosato, 1884

= Alvania hirta =

Species of gastropod

Alvania hirta is a species of small sea snail, a marine gastropod mollusk or micromollusk in the family Rissoidae.

== Description ==
The length of the shell attains 2.9 mm.

== Distribution ==
This species occurs in the Mediterranean Sea (Italy, Greece).
