= Alvania disparilis =

Scientific classification
- Kingdom: Animalia
- Phylum: Mollusca
- Class: Gastropoda
- Subclass: Caenogastropoda
- Order: Littorinimorpha
- Family: Rissoidae
- Genus: Alvania
- Species: A. disparilis

Binomial name
- Alvania disparilis Monterosato, 1890

Species of gastropod

Alvania disparilis is a species of small sea snail, a marine gastropod mollusk or micromollusk in the family Rissoidae.

== Description ==
The height of the shell attains 2.95 mm, its diameter 1.75 mm.

== Distribution ==
This species occurs in the Central Mediterranean Sea (Sicily and Greece).
