= Turbonilla rosewateri =

Scientific classification
- Kingdom: Animalia
- Phylum: Mollusca
- Class: Gastropoda
- Family: Pyramidellidae
- Genus: Turbonilla
- Species: T. rosewateri

Binomial name
- Turbonilla rosewateri Corgan & van Aartsen, 1993

Synonyms
- Turbonilla tenuis Pallary, 1904

Species of gastropod

Turbonilla rosewateri is a species of sea snail, a marine gastropod mollusk in the family Pyramidellidae, the pyrams and their allies.

== Distribution ==
This species occurs in the following locations:

- European waters (ERMS scope)
