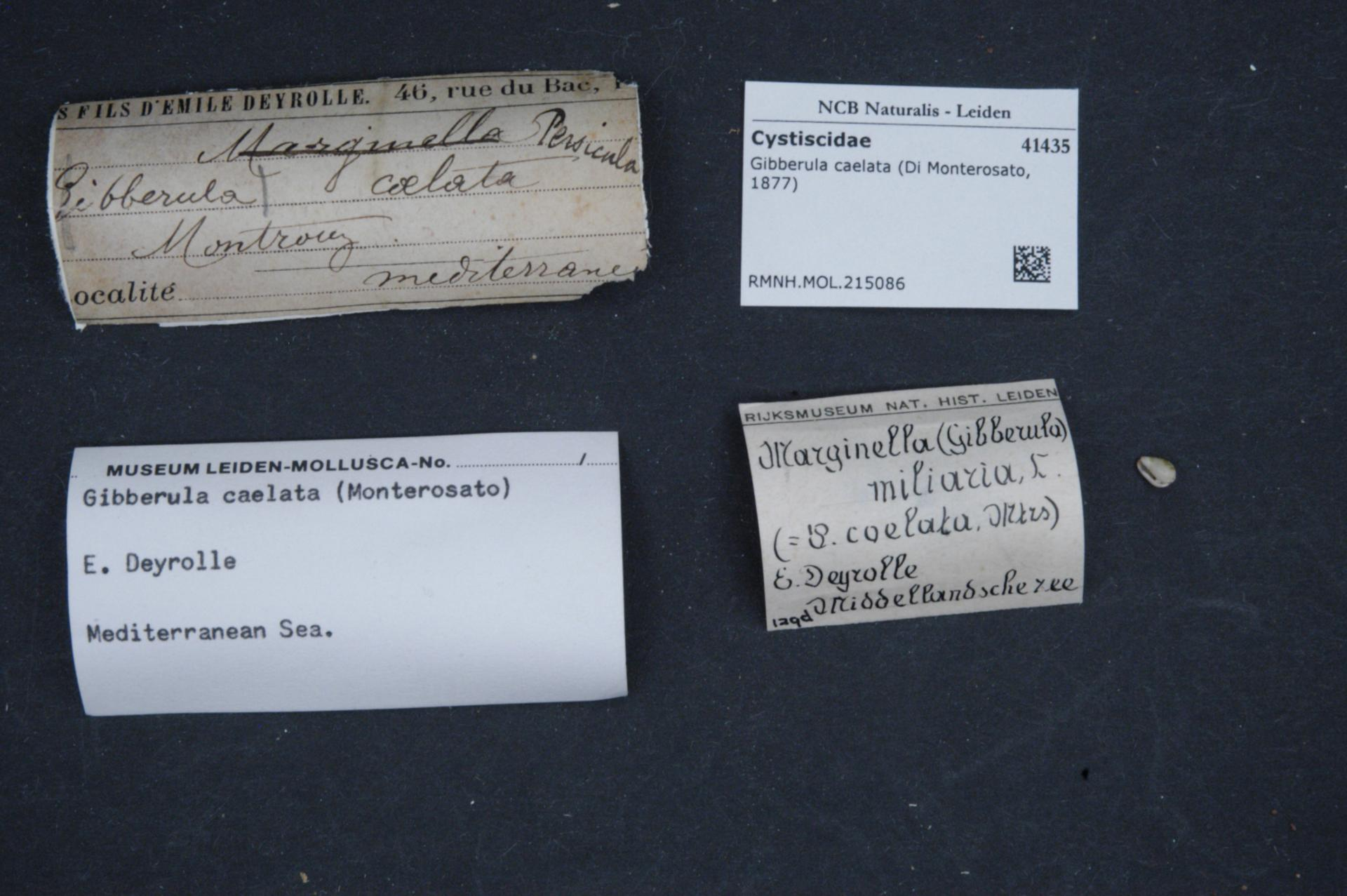

Scientific classification
- Kingdom: Animalia
- Phylum: Mollusca
- Class: Gastropoda
- Subclass: Caenogastropoda
- Order: Neogastropoda
- Family: Cystiscidae
- Subfamily: Cystiscinae
- Genus: Gibberula
- Species: G. caelata

Binomial name
- Gibberula caelata (Monterosato, 1877)

Synonyms
- Marginella caelata Monterosato, 1877

= Gibberula caelata =

Species of gastropod

Gibberula caelata is a species of a marine gastropod in the family Cystiscidae. It is an infralittoral predator.

== Description ==
Gibberula caelata can measure up to about 5 mm (0.20 in). The shell is stocky and light yellowish-white.

== Distribution ==
Gibberula caelata occurs in the Mediterranean Sea and immediately adjacent Atlantic Ocean to Algarve. Although there are reports of it from the Canary Islands, there are no recent confirmed records and the earlier reports all seem to be based on misidentifications.
