= Odostomia lorellae =

Scientific classification
- Kingdom: Animalia
- Phylum: Mollusca
- Class: Gastropoda
- Family: Pyramidellidae
- Genus: Odostomia
- Species: O. lorellae

Binomial name
- Odostomia lorellae Micali, 1987

Synonyms
- Odostomia (Odostomia) lorellae Micali, 1987

Species of gastropod

Odostomia lorellae is a species of sea snail, a marine gastropod mollusc in the family Pyramidellidae, the pyrams and their allies that was discovered in 1987.

== Description ==
The shell grows to a length of 2 mm and appears white with a slight green tinge, the shape of the shell is conical.

== Distribution ==
This species occurs in the following locations:

- European waters (ERMS scope): Mediterranean Sea
