= Odostomia franki =

Scientific classification
- Kingdom: Animalia
- Phylum: Mollusca
- Class: Gastropoda
- Family: Pyramidellidae
- Genus: Odostomia
- Species: O. franki

Binomial name
- Odostomia franki Peñas & Rolán, 1999

Species of gastropod

Odostomia franki is a species of sea snail, a marine gastropod mollusc in the family Pyramidellidae, the pyramids and their allies.

== Distribution ==
This species occurs in the following locations:

- European waters (ERMS scope)
