= Ondina anceps =

Scientific classification
- Kingdom: Animalia
- Phylum: Mollusca
- Class: Gastropoda
- Family: Pyramidellidae
- Genus: Ondina
- Species: O. anceps

Binomial name
- Ondina anceps (Gaglini, 1992)

Species of gastropod

Ondina anceps (Gaglini, 1992) is a species of sea snail, a marine gastropod mollusk in the family Pyramidellidae.

== Distribution ==
This species occurs in the following locations:

- European waters (ERMS scope)
