= Ondina warreni =

- Drawing of a shell of Ondina warreni

Scientific classification
- Kingdom: Animalia
- Phylum: Mollusca
- Class: Gastropoda
- Family: Pyramidellidae
- Genus: Ondina
- Species: O. warreni

Binomial name
- Ondina warreni (Thompson W., 1845)

Synonyms
- Evalea semiornata Folin, L. de, 1872; 0ndina galvagni, Aradas, Rissoa warreni Thompson, 1845 (basionym)

Species of gastropod

Ondina warreni is a species of sea snail, a marine gastropod mollusk in the family Pyramidellidae, the pyrams and their allies.

== Description ==
Compared with Ondina obliqua, the shell of Ondina warreni is smaller, its length varying between 0.8 mm and 3.2 mm. The basal striae are more distinct, and the umbilicus is more developed.

== Distribution ==
This species occurs in the following locations:

- European waters (ERMS scope): Atlantic European coasts
- United Kingdom Exclusive Economic Zone
- Portuguese Exclusive Economic Zone : Madeira
- Spanish Exclusive Economic Zone : Canary Islands
- Mediterranean Sea : Greece, off Apulia, Italy
