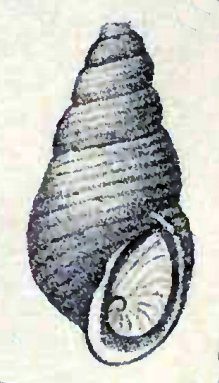
- Drawing of a shell of Menestho albula

Scientific classification
- Kingdom: Animalia
- Phylum: Mollusca
- Class: Gastropoda
- Family: Pyramidellidae
- Genus: Menestho
- Species: M. albula

Binomial name
- Menestho albula (Fabricius, 1780)

Synonyms
- Eulimella (Menestho) albula Möller, 1842

= Menestho albula =

Species of gastropod

Menestho albula is a species of sea snail, a marine gastropod mollusk in the family Pyramidellidae, the pyrams, and their allies.

== Description ==
The species' shell size varies between 4 mm and 9 mm. The white shell has a corpulent shape. The whorls of the teleoconch are slightly convex, with numerous spiral lines.

== Distribution ==
This species occurs in the following locations:

- Cobscook Bay
- European waters (ERMS scope)
- Gulf of Maine
- North West Atlantic (from Labrador to Greenland)

== Notes ==
Additional information regarding this species:

- Distribution: Greenland to Cobscook Bay
- Habitat: infralittoral of the Gulf and estuary
