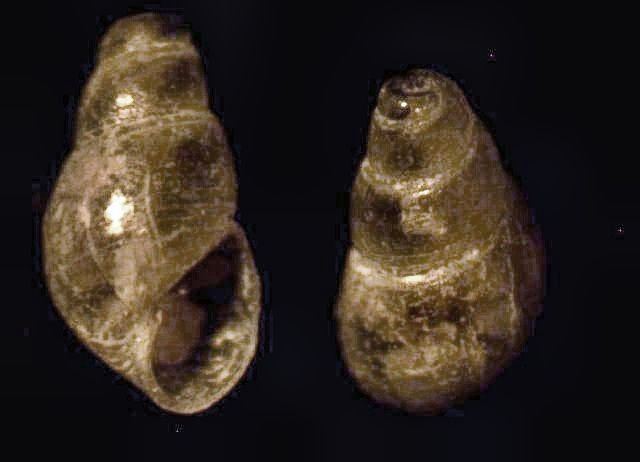
- Ondina divisa

Scientific classification
- Kingdom: Animalia
- Phylum: Mollusca
- Class: Gastropoda
- Family: Pyramidellidae
- Genus: Ondina de Folin, 1870

Type species
- Evalea semiornata Folin, L. de, 1872

Synonyms
- Auriculina, Gray, 1847 (name preoccupied by Grateloup, 1838)

= Ondina =

Genus of gastropods

Ondina is a genus of sea snails, marine gastropod mollusks in the family Pyramidellidae, the pyrams and their allies.

== Description ==
The thin shell has an oval shape. The whorls of the teleoconch are smooth or spirally striated. The columellar tooth is obsolete.

== Species ==
Species within the genus Ondina include:

- Ondina anceps (Gaglini, 1992)
- Ondina coarctata (Sars G.O., 1878)
- Ondina crystallina Locard, 1892
- Ondina diaphana (Jeffreys, 1848)
- Ondina dilucida (Monterosato, 1884)
- Ondina divisa (Adams J., 1797)
- Ondina elachisinoides Hori & Fukuda, 1999
- Ondina fragilissima Peñas & Rolán, 2002
- Ondina jansseni van Aartsen & Menkhorst, 1996
- Ondina modiola (Monterosato, 1884)
- Ondina mosti (van Aartsen, Gittenberger & Goud, 1998)
- Ondina neocrystallina Gaglini, 1991
- Ondina normani (Friele, 1886)
- Ondina obliqua (Alder, 1844)
- Ondina perezi (Dautzenberg & Fisher, 1925)
- Ondina scandens (Monterosato, 1884)
- Ondina semicincgulata (Dall, 1927)
- Ondina strufaldii Peñas & Rolán, 1999
- Ondina vitrea (Brusina, 1866)
- Ondina warreni (Thompson W., 1845)
