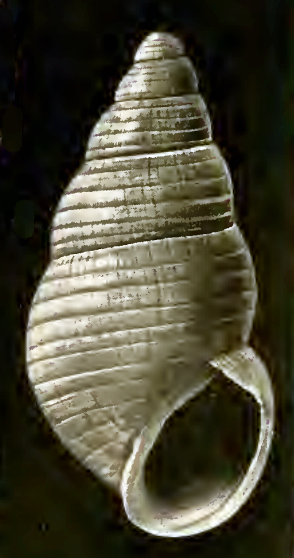
- Apertural view of the shell of Menestho exaratissima

Scientific classification
- Kingdom: Animalia
- Phylum: Mollusca
- Class: Gastropoda
- Family: Pyramidellidae
- Genus: Menestho
- Species: M. exaratissima

Binomial name
- Menestho exaratissima (Dall & Bartsch, 1906)

Synonyms
- Odostomia (Menestho) exaratissima Dall & Bartsch, 1906

= Menestho exaratissima =

Species of gastropod

Menestho exaratissima is a species of sea snail, a marine gastropod mollusk in the family Pyramidellidae, the pyrams and their allies.

== Description ==
The soiled white shell is elongate-conic. It measures 4.8 mm. The at least two whorls of the protoconch are moderately large, helicoid, one-half obliquely immersed in the first volution of the teleoconch, the periphery projecting slightly beyond the left outline of the spire. The six whorls of teleoconch are well rounded, very slightly shouldered. They are marked by faint lines of growth and well incised spiral lines, which are not all of the same strength nor are they equally spaced. Six of these appear upon the second, and seven upon the penultimate whorl between the sutures. The periphery and the base of the body whorl are well rounded, the latter sculptured like the space between the sutures, bearing six incised lines which are not quite as strong as those between the sutures. The aperture is oval, effuse at the junction of the outer lip and the columella. The posterior angle is obtuse. The outer lip is thin, but opaque,. The columella is short, curved, somewhat revolute, reinforced by the attenuated base. The parietal wall is covered by a faint callus.

== Distribution ==
This marine species is found off Japan.

== Habitat ==
This species is found in the following habitats:

- Brackish
- Marine
