= Evalea eclecta =

Scientific classification
- Kingdom: Animalia
- Phylum: Mollusca
- Class: Gastropoda
- Family: Pyramidellidae
- Genus: Evalea
- Species: E. eclecta

Binomial name
- Evalea eclecta (Pilsbry, 1918)

Synonyms
- Evalea peasei (Dautzenberg & Bouge, 1933); Odostomia eclecta Pilsbry, 1918; Odostomia eclecta nematoderma Pilsbry, 1918; Odostomia (Evalina) eclecta eclecta Pilsbry, 1918

Species of gastropod

Evalea eclecta is a species of sea snail, a marine gastropod mollusk in the family Pyramidellidae, the pyrams and their allies.

== Description ==
The white shell is slender and has a conical shape. Its length measures 4.6 mm. Its surface is covered with minute spiral striae. The auricular aperture is small. The columella has a fold.

== Distribution ==
This species is widely distributed in the Indo-Pacific. It is also found off the Hawaiian islands Maui, Oahu and Kauai
