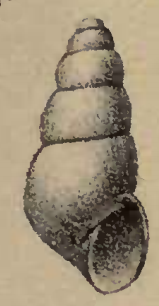
- Drawing of a shell of Liostomia clavula

Scientific classification
- Kingdom: Animalia
- Phylum: Mollusca
- Class: Gastropoda
- Subcohort: Panpulmonata
- Superfamily: Pyramidelloidea
- Family: Pyramidellidae
- Genus: Liostomia; G.O. Sars, 1878

Type species
- Liostomia eburnea Stimpson, W., 1851

Species
- See text

Synonyms
- Cremula Iredale, 1915; † Liostomia (Cryptopolyptychia) Gougerot, 1968 · accepted, alternate representation; Odostomia (Liostomia) G. O. Sars, 1878

= Liostomia =

Genus of gastropods

Liostomia is a genus of sea snails, marine gastropod mollusks in the family Pyramidellidae, the pyrams and their allies.

== Species ==
Species within the genus Liostomia include:

- Liostomia abreui Peñas, Rolán & Swinnen, 2015
- Liostomia afzelii Warén, 1991
- Liostomia beringensis Golikov & Kussakin, 1978
- Liostomia canaliculata Ortega & Gofas, 2019
- Liostomia clavula (Lovén, 1846)
- Liostomia clavuliformis Thiele, 1930
- Liostomia consobrina (Tate & May, 1900)
- Liostomia eburnea (Stimpson, 1851)
- Liostomia electa (Jeffreys, 1883)
- Liostomia georgiana Pfeffer, 1886
- Liostomia hansgei Warén, 1991
- Liostomia mamoi Mifsud, 1993
- Liostomia minutissima Golikov in Golikov & Scarlato, 1967
- Liostomia rara (Thiele, 1925)

The following species were brought into synonymy:'

- Liostomia afzelli Warén, 1991: synonym of Liostomia afzelii Warén, 1991
- Liostomia clavulus [sic]: synonym of Liostomia clavula (Lovén, 1846) (specific name incorrectly spelled)
- Liostomia wareni Schander, 1994: synonym of Odostomia wareni (Schander, 1994)
