= Ondina elachisinoides =

Scientific classification
- Kingdom: Animalia
- Phylum: Mollusca
- Class: Gastropoda
- Family: Pyramidellidae
- Genus: Ondina
- Species: O. elachisinoides

Binomial name
- Ondina elachisinoides Hori & Fukuda, 1999

Synonyms
- Chrysallida elachisinoides (Hori & Fukuda, 1999)

Species of gastropod

Ondina elachisinoides is a species of sea snail, a marine gastropod mollusk in the family Pyramidellidae, the pyrams and their allies.

== Description ==
The length of the shell attains 4 mm.

== Distribution ==
This marine species occurs off the Philippines.
