= Ondina mosti =

Scientific classification
- Kingdom: Animalia
- Phylum: Mollusca
- Class: Gastropoda
- Family: Pyramidellidae
- Genus: Ondina
- Species: O. mosti

Binomial name
- Ondina mosti van Aartsen, Gittenberger & Goud, 1998

Species of gastropod

Ondina mosti is a species of sea snail, a marine gastropod mollusk in the family Pyramidellidae, the pyrams and their allies.

This species was named for B. van der Most, member of the former Malacological Working-group, the Hague.

== Description ==
The shell reaches a length of 2 mm to 2.4 mm.

== Distribution ==
This species occurs in the following locations at depths between 200 m and 400 m.:

- Cape Verde Islands
- Madeira
