= Auristomia nofronii =

Scientific classification
- Kingdom: Animalia
- Phylum: Mollusca
- Class: Gastropoda
- Family: Pyramidellidae
- Genus: Auristomia
- Species: A. nofronii

Binomial name
- Auristomia nofronii Buzzurro, 2002

Species of gastropod

Auristomia nofronii is a species of sea snail, a marine gastropod mollusc in the family Pyramidellidae, the pyrams and their allies.
