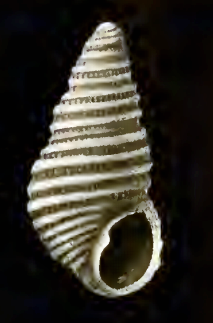
- Apertural view of the shell of Menestho felix

Scientific classification
- Kingdom: Animalia
- Phylum: Mollusca
- Class: Gastropoda
- Family: Pyramidellidae
- Genus: Menestho
- Species: M. felix

Binomial name
- Menestho felix (Dall & Bartsch, 1906)

Synonyms
- Odostomia (Odetta) felix Dall & Bartsch, 1906 (basionym)

= Menestho felix =

Species of gastropod

Menestho felix is a species of sea snail, a marine gastropod mollusk in the family Pyramidellidae, the pyrams and their allies.

== Description ==
The broadly elongated conic shell is turreted and subdiaphanous. It measures approximately 2.6 mm. The whorls of the protoconch are small, almost completely obliquely immersed and only a part of the last rounded volution is visible above the first of the later whorls. The 5½ whorls of the teleoconch are somewhat inflated, well rounded and moderately shouldered. They are marked by strong, equally developed, spiral keels which are separated by subequal, deep, rounded sulci. The latter are somewhat broader than the keels and crossed by many slender raised axial threads. Three keels appear partly upon the first and second, on the third and fourth suture, but the greater part of it is covered up by the summit of the succeeding volution. The penultimate whorl has four keels, the posterior one of which marks the summit and is a little wider than the rest and somewhat flattened. The periphery of the body whorl is marked by a sulcus. The base of the shell is well rounded and attenuated. It is ornamented like the spaces between the sutures, having six spiral keels. These keels, as well as the sulci, gradually diminish in breadth from the periphery to the umbilical region. The aperture is oval. The outer lip is thin, showing the external sculpture within. The columella is rather heavy, somewhat curved, backed up by the attenuated base and provided with a strong oblique fold at its insertion. The parietal wall is covered by a thin callus.

== Distribution ==
This marine species is found off the coast of Japan and the Gulf of Thailand.
