= Evalea stocki =

Scientific classification
- Kingdom: Animalia
- Phylum: Mollusca
- Class: Gastropoda
- Family: Pyramidellidae
- Genus: Evalea
- Species: E. stocki

Binomial name
- Evalea stocki Jong & Coomans, 1988

Species of gastropod

Evalea stocki is a species of sea snail, a marine gastropod mollusk in the family Pyramidellidae, the pyrams and their allies.
