= Menestho beermanae =

Scientific classification
- Kingdom: Animalia
- Phylum: Mollusca
- Class: Gastropoda
- Family: Pyramidellidae
- Genus: Menestho
- Species: M. beermanae

Binomial name
- Menestho beermanae Jong & Coomans, 1988

Species of gastropod

Menestho beermanae is a species of sea snail, a marine gastropod mollusk in the family Pyramidellidae, the pyrams and their allies.

== Description ==
The shell grows to a length of 1.5 mm.

== Distribution ==
This marine species occurs off Aruba.
