= Liostomia georgiana =

Scientific classification
- Kingdom: Animalia
- Phylum: Mollusca
- Class: Gastropoda
- Family: Pyramidellidae
- Genus: Liostomia
- Species: L. georgiana

Binomial name
- Liostomia georgiana Pfeffer, 1886

Species of gastropod

Liostomia georgiana is a species of sea snail, a marine gastropod mollusk in the family Pyramidellidae, the pyrams and their allies.
