= Ondina crystallina =

Scientific classification
- Kingdom: Animalia
- Phylum: Mollusca
- Class: Gastropoda
- Family: Pyramidellidae
- Genus: Ondina
- Species: O. crystallina

Binomial name
- Ondina crystallina Locard, 1892

Species of gastropod

Ondina crystallina is a species of sea snail, a marine gastropod mollusk in the family Pyramidellidae, the pyrams and their allies.

== Description ==
The length of the shell measures 2 mm.

== Distribution ==
This species occurs in the following locations:

- European waters (ERMS scope)
- Portuguese Exclusive Economic Zone
- Spanish Exclusive Economic Zone
- Mediterranean Sea
