= Evalea fernandina =

Scientific classification
- Kingdom: Animalia
- Phylum: Mollusca
- Class: Gastropoda
- Family: Pyramidellidae
- Genus: Evalea
- Species: E. fernandina

Binomial name
- Evalea fernandina (Bartsch, 1927)

Species of gastropod

Evalea fernandina is a species of sea snail, a marine gastropod mollusk in the family Pyramidellidae, the pyrams and their allies.
