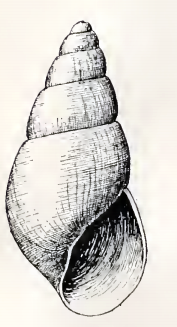
- Drawing of a shell of Evalea amchitkana

Scientific classification
- Kingdom: Animalia
- Phylum: Mollusca
- Class: Gastropoda
- Family: Pyramidellidae
- Genus: Evalea
- Species: E. amchitkana

Binomial name
- Evalea amchitkana (Dall & Bartsch, 1909)

Synonyms
- Odostomia (Evalea) amchitkana Dall & Bartsch, 1909

= Evalea amchitkana =

Species of gastropod

Evalea amchitkana is a species of sea snail, a marine gastropod mollusk in the family Pyramidellidae, the pyrams and their allies.

== Description ==
The thin shell has a broadly conic shape. It is semitranslucent, bluish-white. Its length measures 3.3 mm. The whorls of the protoconch are very obliquely immersed in the first of the succeeding turns, above which only the last half of the last turn is visible. The five whorls of the teleoconch are well rounded, and faintly shouldered at the summit. They are marked by fine lines of growth and numerous very fine equal and equally spaced spirally incised lines, of which there are probably more than forty between the periphery and the summit of the last turn. The sutures are rendered subchanneled by the slight shoulder at the summit of the whorls. The periphery and the base of the body whorl are well rounded, the latter somewhat attenuated and marked like the spaces between the sutures. The aperture is large, and broadly pear-shaped. The posterior angle is obtuse. The outer lip is broadly recurved, thin, and showing the fine external striation within. The columella is slender, curved, and revolute. It is reinforced by the attenuated base and provided with a weak fold at its insertion, which is not visible when the aperture is viewed squarely. The parietal wall is glazed with a thin callus.

== Distribution ==
This species occurs off Amchitka Island and Baranoff Island, Alaska.
