= Evalea emeryi =

Scientific classification
- Kingdom: Animalia
- Phylum: Mollusca
- Class: Gastropoda
- Family: Pyramidellidae
- Genus: Evalea
- Species: E. emeryi

Binomial name
- Evalea emeryi (Bartsch, 1955)

Synonyms
- Odostomia (Evalea) emeryi Bartsch, 1955

Species of gastropod

Evalea emeryi is a species of sea snail, a marine gastropod mollusk in the family Pyramidellidae, the pyrams and their allies.

== Distribution ==
This marine species occurs in the following locations: from North Carolina to Texas. Fossils were found in Pliocene strata, north of St. Petersburg, Florida, USA.
