= Liostomia beringensis =

Scientific classification
- Kingdom: Animalia
- Phylum: Mollusca
- Class: Gastropoda
- Family: Pyramidellidae
- Genus: Liostomia
- Species: L. beringensis

Binomial name
- Liostomia beringensis Golikov & Kussakin, 1978

Species of gastropod

Liostomia beringensis is a species of sea snail, a marine gastropod mollusk in the family Pyramidellidae, the pyrams and their allies.

== Habitat ==
This species is found in the following habitats:

- Brackish
- Marine
