= Menestho truncatula =

Scientific classification
- Kingdom: Animalia
- Phylum: Mollusca
- Class: Gastropoda
- Family: Pyramidellidae
- Genus: Menestho
- Species: M. truncatula

Binomial name
- Menestho truncatula Odhner, 1915

Species of gastropod

Menestho truncatula is a species of sea snail, a marine gastropod mollusk in the family Pyramidellidae, the pyrams and their allies.

== Description ==
The shell size varies between 2.5 mm and 3.5 mm.

== Distribution ==
This species occurs in the following locations:

- European waters (ERMS scope) (Barents Sea - Chuckchi Sea)
- United Kingdom Exclusive Economic Zone

It is a benthic species, living on the seabed, and has been recorded at depths of 10-68 metres.
