= Ondina jansseni =

Scientific classification
- Kingdom: Animalia
- Phylum: Mollusca
- Class: Gastropoda
- Family: Pyramidellidae
- Genus: Ondina
- Species: O. jansseni

Binomial name
- Ondina jansseni van Aartsen & Menkhorst, 1996

Synonyms
- Evalea jansseni van Aartsen & Menkhorst, 1996

Species of gastropod

Ondina jansseni is a species of sea snail, a marine gastropod mollusk in the family Pyramidellidae, the pyrams and their allies.

== Distribution ==
This marine species occurs off Brittany, France.
