= Auristomia barashi =

Scientific classification
- Kingdom: Animalia
- Phylum: Mollusca
- Class: Gastropoda
- Family: Pyramidellidae
- Genus: Auristomia
- Species: A. barashi

Binomial name
- Auristomia barashi (Bogi & Galil, 2000)

Synonyms
- Odostomia (Auristomia) barashi Bogi & Galil, 2000; Odostomia barashi Bogi & Galil, 2000

Species of gastropod

Auristomia barashi is a species of sea snail, a marine gastropod mollusk in the family Pyramidellidae, the pyrams and their allies.

== Description ==
The shell grows to a length of 2 mm.

== Distribution ==
This species occurs in the following locations:

- Mersin Bay (Turkey)
- Eastern Mediterranean
