= Evalea elegans =

Scientific classification
- Kingdom: Animalia
- Phylum: Mollusca
- Class: Gastropoda
- Family: Pyramidellidae
- Genus: Evalea
- Species: E. elegans

Binomial name
- Evalea elegans (A. Adams, 1860)

Synonyms
- Odostomia (Evalea) elegans A. Adams, 1860

Species of gastropod

Evalea elegans is a species of sea snail, a marine gastropod mollusk in the family Pyramidellidae, the pyrams and their allies.

== Description ==
The shell has a ventricose shape. It is spirally ornamented. The columella is plicate.
