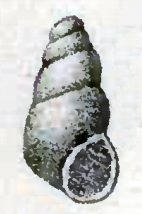
- Drawing of a shell of Liostomia eburnea

Scientific classification
- Kingdom: Animalia
- Phylum: Mollusca
- Class: Gastropoda
- Family: Pyramidellidae
- Genus: Liostomia
- Species: L. eburnea

Binomial name
- Liostomia eburnea (Stimpson, 1851)

Synonyms
- Eulimella eburnea Stimpson, 1851

= Liostomia eburnea =

Species of gastropod

Liostomia eburnea is a species of sea snail, a marine gastropod mollusk in the family Pyramidellidae, the pyrams and their allies.

== Description ==
The white, shining shell has a smooth sculpture. Its length measures 4–5 mm. The four whorls of the teleoconch are rather convex, subangulated at the suture. The aperture is ovate-elliptic. The peristome is thin, simple, acute, effuse anteriorly. The umbilicus is narrow.

== Distribution ==
This species occurs in the following locations:

- European waters (ERMS scope) (Barents Sea; Okhotsk Sea)
- Gulf of St Lawrence, Canada to Massachusetts, USA
- Gulf of Maine
- Northwest Atlantic Ocean

== Notes ==
Additional information regarding this species:

- Distribution: Range: 74°N to 42°N; 70.5°W to 0°W. Distribution: Greenland; Greenland: West Greenland, East Greenland; Canada; Canada: Gulf of St. Lawrence, New Brunswick; USA: Maine, Massachusetts
- Habitat: circalittoral of the Gulf and estuary
