= Evalea plana =

Scientific classification
- Kingdom: Animalia
- Phylum: Mollusca
- Class: Gastropoda
- Family: Pyramidellidae
- Genus: Evalea
- Species: E. plana

Binomial name
- Evalea plana Laws, 1941

Species of gastropod

Evalea plana is a species of sea snail, a marine gastropod mollusk in the family Pyramidellidae, the pyrams and their allies.
