= Evalea carinae =

Scientific classification
- Kingdom: Animalia
- Phylum: Mollusca
- Class: Gastropoda
- Family: Pyramidellidae
- Genus: Evalea
- Species: E. carinae

Binomial name
- Evalea carinae van Aartsen & Corgan, 1996

Synonyms
- Odostomia io W.H. Turton, 1932

Species of gastropod

Evalea carinae is a species of sea snail, a marine gastropod mollusk in the family Pyramidellidae, the pyrams and their allies.
