= Evalea propria =

Scientific classification
- Kingdom: Animalia
- Phylum: Mollusca
- Class: Gastropoda
- Family: Pyramidellidae
- Genus: Evalea
- Species: E. propria

Binomial name
- Evalea propria Laws, 1941

Species of gastropod

Evalea propria is a species of sea snail, a marine gastropod mollusk in the family Pyramidellidae, the pyrams and their allies.
