= Ondina neocrystallina =

Scientific classification
- Kingdom: Animalia
- Phylum: Mollusca
- Class: Gastropoda
- Family: Pyramidellidae
- Genus: Ondina
- Species: O. neocrystallina

Binomial name
- Ondina neocrystallina Gaglini, 1991

Synonyms
- Evalea neocrystallina (Gaglini, 1991)

Species of gastropod

Ondina neocrystallina is a species of sea snail, a marine gastropod mollusk in the family Pyramidellidae, the pyrams and their allies.

== Distribution ==
This species occurs in the Mediterranean Sea.
