= Evalea waikikiensis =

Scientific classification
- Kingdom: Animalia
- Phylum: Mollusca
- Class: Gastropoda
- Family: Pyramidellidae
- Genus: Evalea
- Species: E. waikikiensis

Binomial name
- Evalea waikikiensis (Pilsbry, 1918)

Synonyms
- Odostomia gracilis Pease, 1868; Odostomia haleiwensis Pilsbry, 1918; Odostomia hiloensis Pilsbry, 1944; Odostomia (Evalina) waikikiensis Pilsbry, 1917; Eulimella haleiwensis

Species of gastropod

Evalea waikikiensis is a species of sea snail, a marine gastropod mollusk in the family Pyramidellidae, the pyrams and their allies.

== Description ==
The white shell has an inflated conical shape. Its length measures 3.1 mm. Its surface is covered with minute striae, that are somewhat more widely spaced.

== Distribution ==
This species occurs in the Pacific Ocean off the Hawaiian islands Maui and Oahu.
