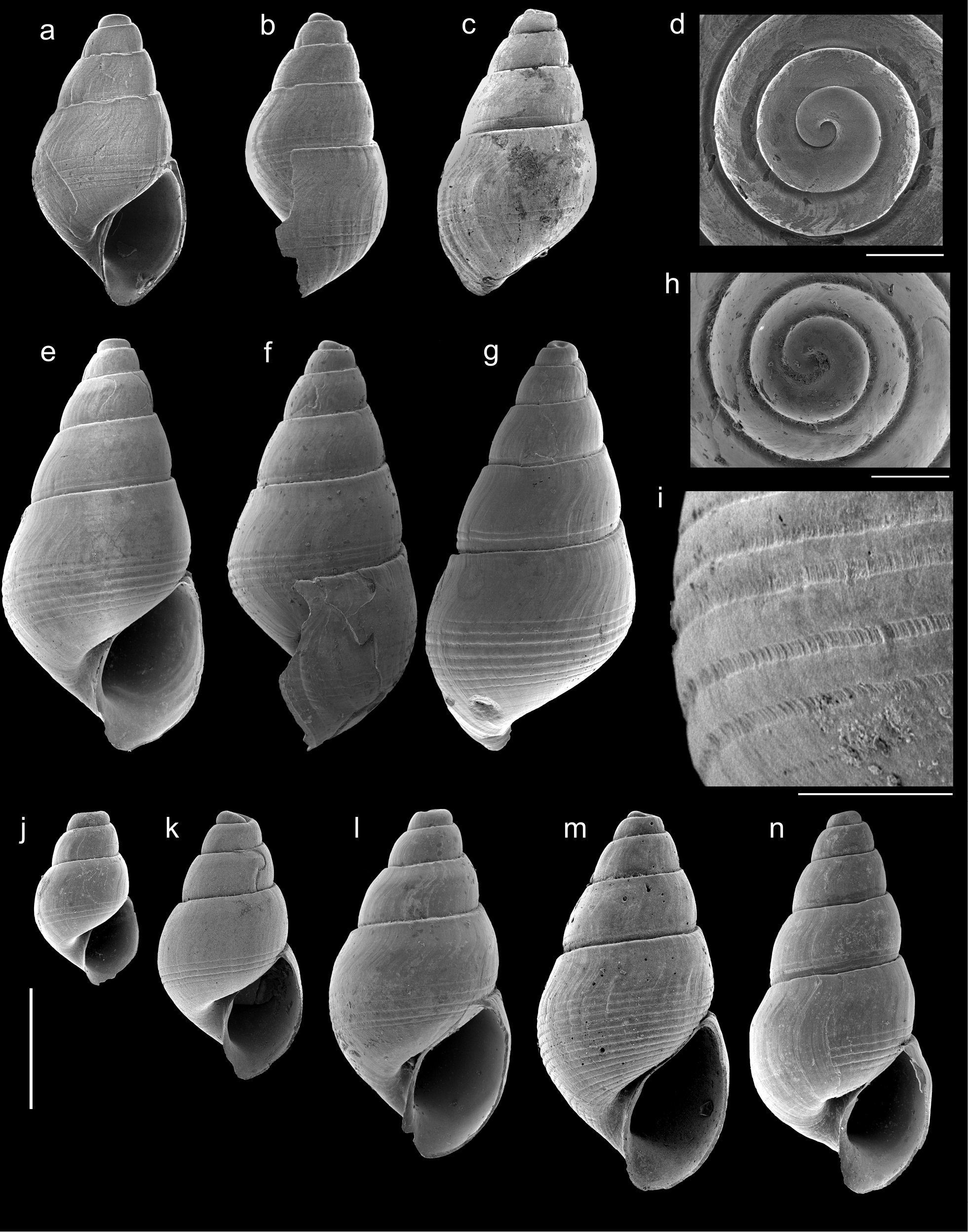

Scientific classification
- Kingdom: Animalia
- Phylum: Mollusca
- Class: Gastropoda
- Family: Pyramidellidae
- Genus: Ondina
- Species: O. semicincgulata

Binomial name
- Ondina semicincgulata (Dall, 1927)

Synonyms
- Acteon semicingulatus Dall, 1927; Evalea ryclea (Dall, 1927); Odostomia (Evalea) ryclea Dall, 1927

= Ondina semicincgulata =

Species of gastropod

Ondina semicincgulata is a species of sea snail, a marine gastropod mollusk in the family Pyramidellidae, the pyrams and their allies. It was originally described to Evalea in 1927 but moved to Ondina in 2018.
