= Ondina fragilissima =

Scientific classification
- Kingdom: Animalia
- Phylum: Mollusca
- Class: Gastropoda
- Family: Pyramidellidae
- Genus: Ondina
- Species: O. fragilissima

Binomial name
- Ondina fragilissima Peñas & Rolán, 2002

Synonyms
- Evalea fragilissima (Peñas & Rolán, 2002)

Species of gastropod

Ondina fragilissima is a species of sea snail, a marine gastropod mollusk in the family Pyramidellidae, the pyrams and their allies. The species name is Latin for "most fragile", and alludes to the limited consistency of the shell.

== Distribution ==
The species is found in the Atlantic Ocean off Ghana and Guinea.
