= Auristomia erjaveciana =

Scientific classification
- Kingdom: Animalia
- Phylum: Mollusca
- Class: Gastropoda
- Family: Pyramidellidae
- Genus: Auristomia
- Species: A. erjaveciana

Binomial name
- Auristomia erjaveciana (Brusina, 1869)

Synonyms
- Menestho tenuicula F. Nordsieck, 1972; Odostomia erjaveciana Brusina, 1869; Odostomia retardata Tiberi, N.D.N., 1869; Odostomia (Auristomia) erjaveciana Brusina, S., 1869

Species of gastropod

Auristomia erjaveciana is a species of sea snail, a marine gastropod mollusk in the family Pyramidellidae, the pyrams and their allies.

== Description ==
The size of the shell varies between 1.9 mm and 3 mm. The shell is smooth. The aperture is large and auriculate.

== Distribution ==
This species occurs in the following locations:

- European waters (ERMS scope) : Mediterranean Sea
- Greek Exclusive Economic Zone
- Portuguese Exclusive Economic Zone
- Spanish Exclusive Economic Zone
