= Ondina coarctata =

Scientific classification
- Kingdom: Animalia
- Phylum: Mollusca
- Class: Gastropoda
- Family: Pyramidellidae
- Genus: Ondina
- Species: O. coarctata

Binomial name
- Ondina coarctata (Sars G.O., 1878)

Synonyms
- Evalea coarctata (Sars G.O., 1878)

Species of gastropod

Ondina coarctata is a species of sea snail, a marine gastropod mollusk in the family Pyramidellidae, the pyrams and their allies.

== Description ==
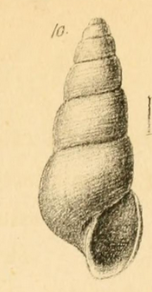
Figure of Auriculina coarctata (now Ondina coarctata)

The shell of the snail is thin, fragile, and pale yellowish in color, with a narrowly conical shape. The spire is long, slightly tapering, and ends in a conical-blunt apex. The shell has 6-7 tightly pressed whorls, with the last whorl being somewhat dilated. The base is relatively broad, occupying about half the length of the shell. The suture is slightly oblique and narrowly impressed. The aperture is oblong, expanding at the bottom, with a somewhat curved external lip. The columella is slightly arched, and the umbilicus is distinct and deep. The surface is covered with fine, uniform spiral lines. The length of the shell typically reaches about 5.2 mm.

== Distribution ==
This species occurs in the following locations:

- European waters (ERMS scope)
- Arctic Norway
- United Kingdom Exclusive Economic Zone

The species has been found in West Finnmark, Norway, it was first discovered by a few collected dead specimens. It was found at depths of 50-100 fathoms (F.D.).
