= Liostomia minutissima =

Scientific classification
- Kingdom: Animalia
- Phylum: Mollusca
- Class: Gastropoda
- Family: Pyramidellidae
- Genus: Liostomia
- Species: L. minutissima

Binomial name
- Liostomia minutissima Golikov in Golikov & Scarlato, 1967

Species of gastropod

Liostomia minutissima is a species of sea snail in the Pyramidellidae family.

== Habitat ==
This species is found in the following habitats:

- Brackish
- Marine
