= Menestho shataii =

Scientific classification
- Kingdom: Animalia
- Phylum: Mollusca
- Class: Gastropoda
- Family: Pyramidellidae
- Genus: Menestho
- Species: M. shataii

Binomial name
- Menestho shataii Nomura, 1936

Species of sea snail

Menestho shataii is a species of sea snail, a marine gastropod mollusk in the family Pyramidellidae, the pyrams and their allies.
