= Liostomia hansgei =

Scientific classification
- Kingdom: Animalia
- Phylum: Mollusca
- Class: Gastropoda
- Family: Pyramidellidae
- Genus: Liostomia
- Species: L. hansgei

Binomial name
- Liostomia hansgei Warén, 1991

Species of gastropod

Liostomia hansgei is a species of sea snail, a marine gastropod mollusk in the family Pyramidellidae, the pyrams and their allies.

== Distribution ==
This species occurs in the following locations:

- European waters (ERMS scope)
