= Ondina strufaldii =

Scientific classification
- Kingdom: Animalia
- Phylum: Mollusca
- Class: Gastropoda
- Family: Pyramidellidae
- Genus: Ondina
- Species: O. strufaldii

Binomial name
- Ondina strufaldii Peñas & Rolán, 1999

Synonyms
- Evalea strufaldii Peñas & Rolán, 1999

Species of gastropod

Ondina strufaldii is a species of sea snail, a marine gastropod mollusk in the family Pyramidellidae, the pyrams and their allies.

== Description ==
The shell grows to a length of 1.1 mm.

== Distribution ==
This species occurs in the following locations:

- Cape Verde
