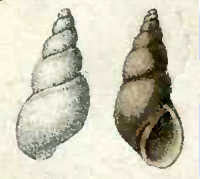
- Drawing of a shell of Ondina obliqua

Scientific classification
- Kingdom: Animalia
- Phylum: Mollusca
- Class: Gastropoda
- Family: Pyramidellidae
- Genus: Ondina
- Species: O. obliqua

Binomial name
- Ondina obliqua (Alder, 1844)

Synonyms
- Evalea obliqua Monterosato, T.A. de M. di, 1878; Odostomia obliqua Alder, 1844 (basionym)

= Ondina obliqua =

Species of gastropod

Ondina obliqua is a rare species of sea snail, a marine gastropod mollusk in the family Pyramidellidae, the pyrams and their allies.

== Description ==
The shell reaches a length of 2.5 mm to 5 mm. The very thin, whitish shell has a transparent, glossy appearance. It has a typical intorted protoconch. The teleoconch contains five whorls, marked with fine, close spiral striae, becoming coarser on the base. The suture is deep and oblique. The outer lip is flexuous, retreating, sinuated above. It is smooth within. The columellar tooth shows only a slight obscure fold. There is no umbilicus or a very small umbilical chink.

== Distribution ==
This species occurs in the following locations:

- European waters (from South Scandinavia to the Bay of Biscay)
- Portuguese Exclusive Economic Zone
- Spanish Exclusive Economic Zone
- United Kingdom Exclusive Economic Zone
- Mediterranean Sea
- Atlantic Ocean : Madeira., Canary Islands
