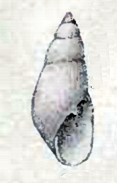
- Drawing of a shell of Ondina vitrea

Scientific classification
- Kingdom: Animalia
- Phylum: Mollusca
- Class: Gastropoda
- Family: Pyramidellidae
- Genus: Ondina
- Species: O. vitrea

Binomial name
- Ondina vitrea (Brusina, 1866)

Synonyms
- Evalea exigua F. Nordsieck, 1972; Evalea spiridionae F. Nordsieck, 1972

= Ondina vitrea =

Species of gastropod

Ondina vitrea is a species of sea snail, a marine gastropod mollusk in the family Pyramidellidae, the pyrams and their allies.

== Description ==
The length of shell varies between 3.5 mm and 4.5 mm. The white shell is pellucid. The sculpture is decussated by microscopic striae. The teleoconch contains seven convex whorls. The suture is submargined. The columella is obliquely uniplicate.

== Distribution ==
This species occurs in the following locations:

- European waters (ERMS scope)
- Mediterranean Sea : Sicily, Greece
- Portuguese Exclusive Economic Zone
- Spanish Exclusive Economic Zone
