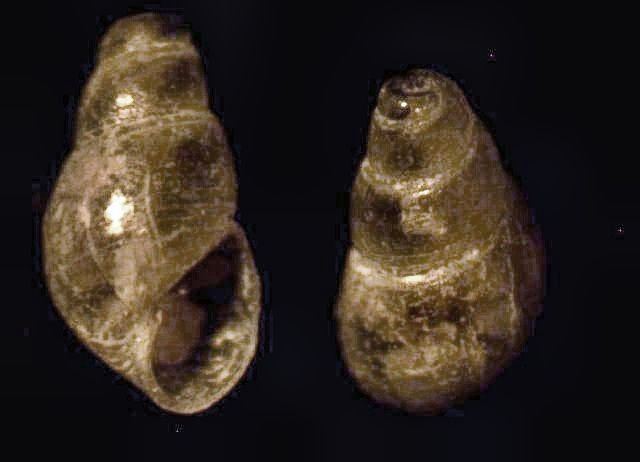

Scientific classification
- Kingdom: Animalia
- Phylum: Mollusca
- Class: Gastropoda
- Family: Pyramidellidae
- Genus: Ondina
- Species: O. divisa

Binomial name
- Ondina divisa (J. Adams, 1797)

Synonyms
- Auriculina insculpta nobilis Sars, G.O., 1878; Menestho divisa (J. Adams, 1797); Odostomia insculpta (Montagu, 1808); Odostomia insculpta var. tumida Jeffreys 1869; Odostomia laevissima Marshall 1893; Odostomia marginata Cailliaud 1865; Turbo divisus Adams J. 1797 (basionym); Turbo insculptus Montagu, G., 1808, "1805"

= Ondina divisa =

Species of gastropod

Ondina divisa is a species of sea snail, a marine gastropod mollusk in the family Pyramidellidae, the pyrams and their allies.

== Description ==
The length of the shell measures 3 mm.

== Distribution ==
This species occurs in the following locations:

- European waters (Iceland and from Norway to the Bay of Biscay)
- Belgian Exclusive Economic Zone
- British Isles
- Irish Exclusive economic Zone
- Mediterranean Sea
