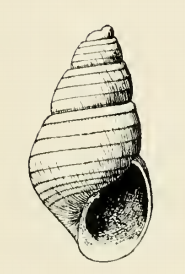
- Apertural view of a shell of Odostomia amilda

Scientific classification
- Kingdom: Animalia
- Phylum: Mollusca
- Class: Gastropoda
- Family: Pyramidellidae
- Genus: Odostomia
- Species: O. amilda

Binomial name
- Odostomia amilda William Healey Dall & Paul Bartsch, 1909

Synonyms
- Menestho amilda Dall & Bartsch, 1909; Odostomia (Menestho) amilda Dall & Bartsch, 1909 (basionym)

= Odostomia amilda =

Species of gastropod

Odostomia amilda is a species of sea snail, a marine gastropod mollusc in the family Pyramidellidae, the pyrams and their allies.

== Description ==
The ovate shell is transparent. Its length measures 2.6 mm. The whorls of the protoconch are deeply immersed in the first of the succeeding turns, above which only the tilted edge of the last whorl projects. The four whorls of the teleoconch are well rounded, slightly contracted at the sutures, and somewhat shouldered at the summits, the first marked by four slender equal and subequally spaced incised spiral lines: the first are marked by a strongly incised groove a little below the summit which causes this to appear bounded by a well-rounded cord; The periphery of the body whorl is well rounded, the base somewhat inflated, well rounded, slightly attenuated anteriorly, marked by numerous exceedingly small microscopic spiral striations and three well incised equally spaced lines on the anterior half. The aperture is oval, somewhat effuse anteriorly. The posterior angle is obtuse. The outer lip is thin, showing the external sculpture within. The columella is slender, decidedly curved, somewhat reflected, reinforced by the base. The columella is provided with a strong fold at its insertion.

== Distribution ==
This species occurs in the Pacific Ocean off California.
