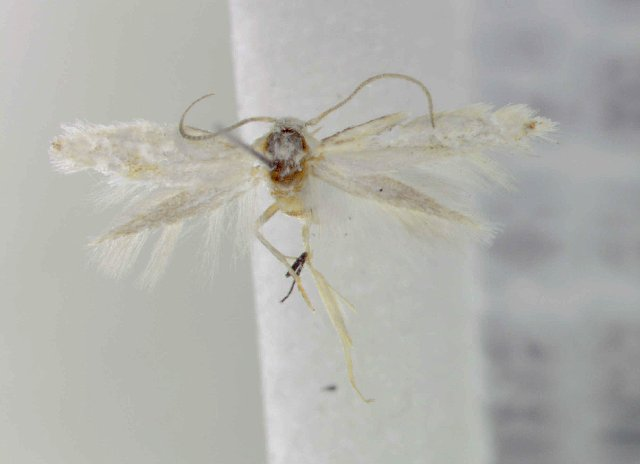

Scientific classification
- Domain: Eukaryota
- Kingdom: Animalia
- Phylum: Arthropoda
- Class: Insecta
- Order: Lepidoptera
- Family: Elachistidae
- Genus: Elachista
- Species: E. exigua

Binomial name
- Elachista exigua Parenti, 1978

= Elachista exigua =

Species of moth

Elachista exigua is a moth of the family Elachistidae. It is found in France, Switzerland, Italy and Ukraine.
