= Odostomia grijalvae =

Scientific classification
- Kingdom: Animalia
- Phylum: Mollusca
- Class: Gastropoda
- Family: Pyramidellidae
- Genus: Odostomia
- Species: O. grijalvae

Binomial name
- Odostomia grijalvae Baker, Hanna & Strong, 1928

Synonyms
- Menestho grijalvae (Baker, Hanna & Strong, 1928)

Species of gastropod

Odostomia grijalvae is a species of sea snail, a marine gastropod mollusc in the family Pyramidellidae, the pyrams and their allies.

== Distribution ==
This species occurs in the Pacific Ocean off the Galapagos Islands.
