= Euparthenia humboldti =

Scientific classification
- Kingdom: Animalia
- Phylum: Mollusca
- Class: Gastropoda
- Family: Pyramidellidae
- Genus: Euparthenia
- Species: E. humboldti

Binomial name
- Euparthenia humboldti (Risso, 1826)

Species of gastropod

Euparthenia humboldti is a species of sea snail, a marine gastropod mollusk in the family Pyramidellidae, the pyrams and their allies.

== Distribution ==
This species occurs in the following locations:

- European waters (ERMS scope)
- Greek Exclusive Economic Zone
