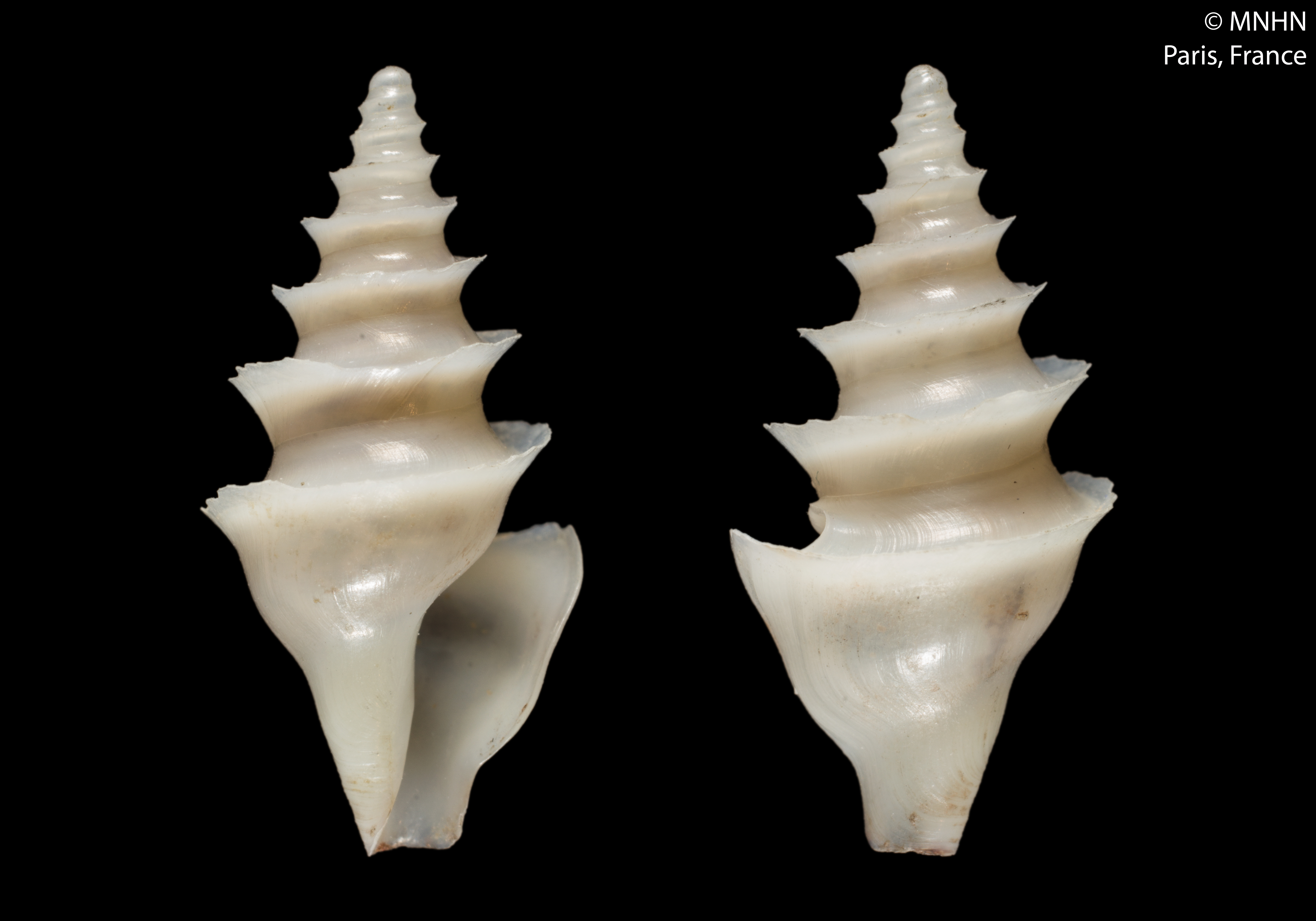
- Shell of Spirotropis monterosatoi (lectotype at MNHN, Paris)

Scientific classification
- Kingdom: Animalia
- Phylum: Mollusca
- Class: Gastropoda
- Subclass: Caenogastropoda
- Order: Neogastropoda
- Superfamily: Conoidea
- Family: Drilliidae
- Genus: Spirotropis
- Species: S. monterosatoi

Binomial name
- Spirotropis monterosatoi Martens, 1904

Synonyms
- Pleurotoma monterosatoi Locard, 1897 (basionym); Taranis (Allo) monterosatoi (Locard, 1897)

= Spirotropis monterosatoi =

Species of gastropod

Spirotropis monterosatoi is a species of sea snail, a marine gastropod mollusk in the family Drilliidae.

== Taxonomy ==
Bouchet & Warén (1980) placed S. sarsi Warén, 1975 and S. carinata of Mediterranean authors in the synonymy of this species, but this was shown to be incorrect by Janssen (1993).

== Description ==
The size of an adult shell varies between 14 mm and 26 mm.

== Distribution ==
This species occurs in the benthic zone between Iceland and Norway, down to Northwest Africa; in the Mediterranean Sea.
