= Odostomia pocahontasae =

Scientific classification
- Kingdom: Animalia
- Phylum: Mollusca
- Class: Gastropoda
- Family: Pyramidellidae
- Genus: Odostomia
- Species: O. pocahontasae

Binomial name
- Odostomia pocahontasae Henderson & Bartsch, 1914

Synonyms
- Evalea pocahontasae Henderson & J.B. & P. Bartsch, 1914; Odostomia (Evalea) pocahontasae Henderson & Bartsch, 1914; Odostomia (Eulimastoma) canaliculata (Adams, C.B., 1850)

Species of gastropod

Odostomia pocahontasae is a species of sea snail, a marine gastropod mollusc in the family Pyramidellidae, the pyrams and their allies.

== Description ==
The length of the shell varies between 1.3 mm and 5.7 mm. It is dextrally coiled and multicellular with a calcium carbonate mineralized skeleton. It sexually reproduces and moves by mucus mediated gliding.

== Distribution ==
This marine species occurs off Florida, USA, Colombia, and Argentina.
