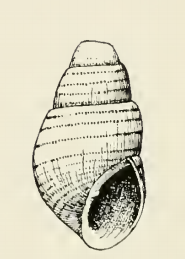
- Apertural view of a shell of Odostomia chilensis

Scientific classification
- Kingdom: Animalia
- Phylum: Mollusca
- Class: Gastropoda
- Family: Pyramidellidae
- Genus: Odostomia
- Species: O. chilensis

Binomial name
- Odostomia chilensis Dall & Bartsch, 1909

Synonyms
- Menestho chilensis Dall & Bartsch, 1909; Odostomia (Menestho) chilensis Dall & Bartsch, 1909 (basionym)

= Odostomia chilensis =

Species of gastropod

Odostomia chilensis is a species of sea snail, a marine gastropod mollusk in the family Pyramidellidae, the pyrams and their allies.

== Description ==
The shell is milk-white. As the type specimen was damaged, the protoconch cannot be described. Probably the first two whorls of the teleoconch were lost. The rest of the type specimen measures 2.3 mm. The remaining three whorls of the teleoconch are well rounded, slightly constricted at the suture and moderately shouldered at the summit. They are marked by four pitted spiral grooves, three of which divide the posterior two-thirds between the sutures into three almost equal areas, while the fourth is at the periphery. The space between the peripheral grooves and the one posterior to it, is equal to one-third the space between the sutures. These grooves as well as those on the base are crossed by many slender axial riblets which break them up into pits. The raised spaces between the grooves are marked by slender lines of growth and many extremely fine spiral striations. The sutures are well impressed. The base of the body whorl is well rounded. It is marked by seven pitted, well incised lines and microscopic spiral striations. The aperture is broadly ovate. The posterior angle is acute. The outer lip is thin. The columella is slender, curved, decidedly revolute. It is provided with a strong oblique fold at its insertion. The parietal wall is covered with a thin callus.

== Distribution ==
The type specimen was found off Tomé, Chile.
