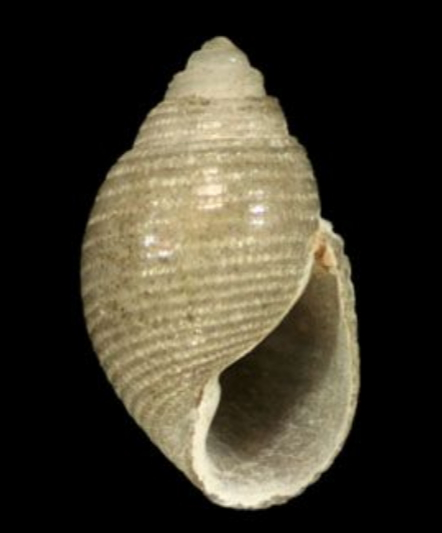
- Shell of Acteon monterosatoi (specimen at the Natural History Museum, Rotterdam)

Scientific classification
- Kingdom: Animalia
- Phylum: Mollusca
- Class: Gastropoda
- Superfamily: Acteonoidea
- Family: Acteonidae
- Genus: Acteon
- Species: A. monterosatoi

Binomial name
- Acteon monterosatoi Dautzenberg, 1889
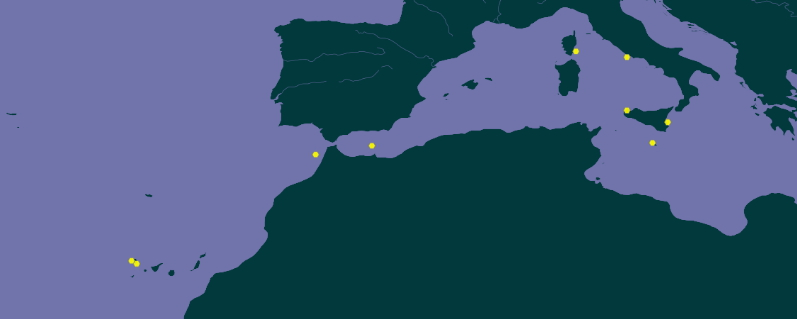

Synonyms
- Actaeon monterosatoi Dautzenberg, 1889

= Acteon monterosatoi =

Species of marine gastropod

Acteon monterosatoi is a species of sea snail, a marine gastropod mollusc in the family Acteonidae.

== Description ==
The length of the shell varies between 2 mm and 6 mm.

The broad shell is ovate-elongated. The spire is conoid. The shell contains five convex whorls. They are transversely sculptured throughout with punctate striae. The body whorl is obese. The aperture is pear-shaped. The columella is straight, hardly folded. The outer lip is arcuate. The color of the shell is dull white.

== Distribution ==
This marine species occurs in the Atlantic Ocean off Portugal, the Azores and Cape Verde; in the Mediterranean Sea off Spain, Italy and Morocco.
