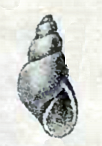
- Drawing of a shell of Ondina diaphana

Scientific classification
- Kingdom: Animalia
- Phylum: Mollusca
- Class: Gastropoda
- Family: Pyramidellidae
- Genus: Ondina
- Species: O. diaphana

Binomial name
- Ondina diaphana (Jeffreys, 1848)

Synonyms
- Menestho diaphana (Jeffreys, 1848); Odostomia diaphana Jeffreys, 1848; Odostomia diaphana var. inflata Marshall, 1893

= Ondina diaphana =

Species of gastropod

Ondina diaphana is a species of sea snail, a marine gastropod mollusk in the family Pyramidellidae, the pyrams and their allies.

== Description ==
The lustrous, whitish shell is very thin and nearly transparent. Its length varies between 1.8 mm and 2.5 mm. The teleoconch contains five whorls. The sculpture is marked by microscopic growth lines. The oblique suture is narrow. The outer lip is flexuous, and deeply sinuous above. The columellar tooth is obsolete. The insignicant umbilicus is developed in the adult only.

== Distribution ==
This species occurs in the following locations:

- Atlantic Ocean : Azores
- North Sea : European waters, United Kingdom
- Mediterranean Sea
