= Tommaso Di Maria Allery Monterosato =

Italian malacologist (1841–1927)

Tommaso di Maria Allery Monterosato
- Born: June 27, 1841; Palermo, Kingdom of the Two Sicilies
- Died: March 1, 1927 (aged 85); Palermo, Kingdom of Italy
- Scientific career
- Fields: Malacology

Tommaso di Maria Allery, marchese di Monterosato (27 June 1841 – 1 March 1927) was an Italian malacologist.

He was born in Palermo, Italy, in 1841 and died there in 1927. He became a distinguished scholar of the Mollusca in the Mediterranean, appreciated by students of malacology from around the world.

Despite his reluctance to research in the field, he collected a considerable amount of specimens to be studied in collaboration with other scholars. During his many travels in Italy and abroad, he kept many contacts with famous malacologists.

His scientific production was of considerable importance. He described many new species, enumerated the Mediterranean shells and studied the fossil deposits of Mount Pellegrino. According to the World Register of Marine Species (WoRMS) he has named 345 marine species, many of which have become synonyms

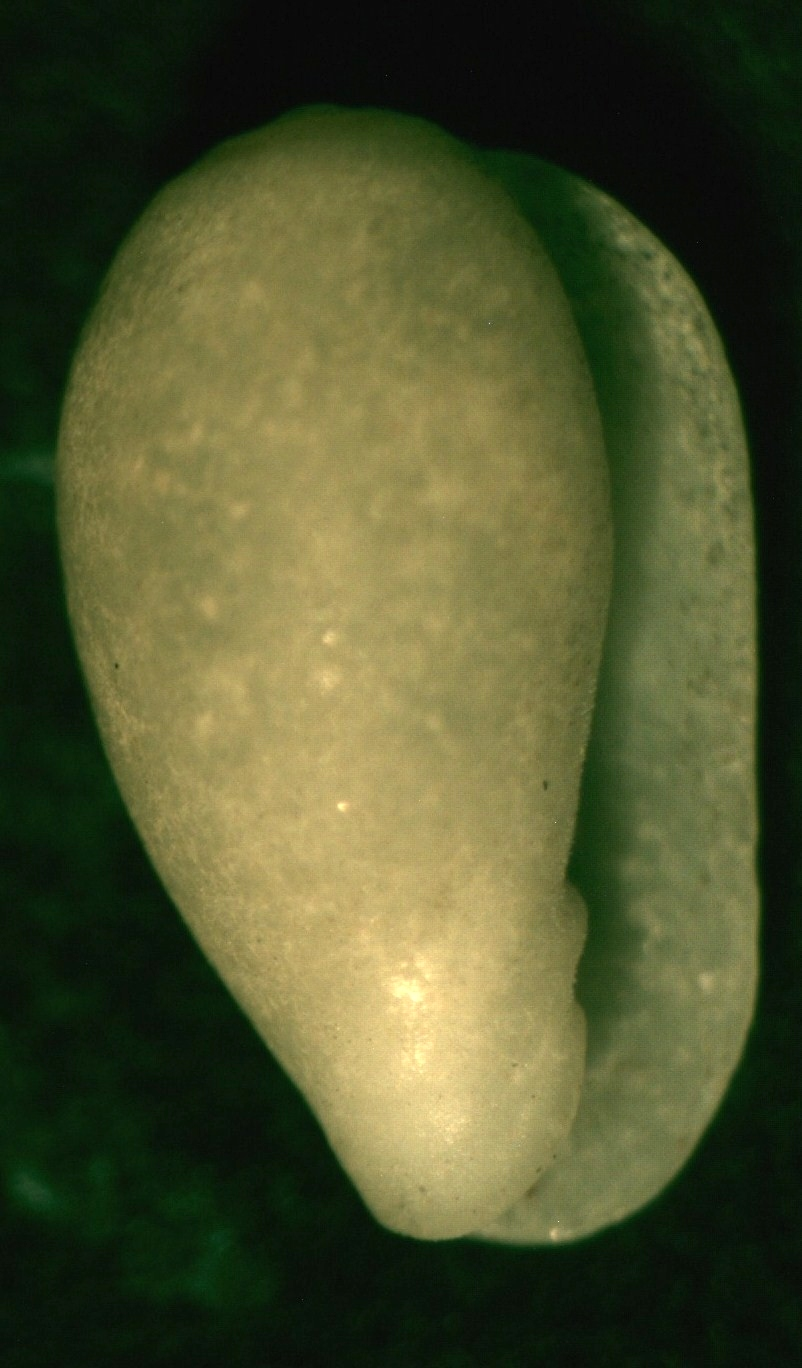
Shell of Gibberula secreta, species named by Monterosato in 1889

== Species named after Monterosato ==
The following marine species were named after Monterosato, many of which have become synonyms

- Acicularia monterosatoi De Boury MS, Monterosato, 1890 : synonym of Melanella pyramidalis (Sowerby, 1866)
- Acteon monterosatoi Dautzenberg, 1889
- Buccinum monterosatoi Locard, 1886 : synonym of Buccinum humphreysianum Bennet, 1824
- Cadulus monterosatoi Locard, 1897
- Coralliophila monterosatoi (Locard, 1897)
- Daronia monterosatoi van Aartsen & Bogi, 1986 : synonym of Rugulina monterosatoi (van Aartsen & Bogi, 1986)
- Granigyra monterosatoi (van Aartsen & Bogi, 1986): synonym of Rugulina monterosatoi (van Aartsen & Bogi, 1986)
- Lepidochitona monterosatoi Kaas & Van Belle, 1981
- Melanella monterosatoi (Monterosato, 1890): synonym of Melanella pyramidalis (Sowerby, 1866)
- Octopus monterosatoi Fra Piero, 1895
- Philine monterosatoi (Sykes, 1905)
- Pleurotoma monterosatoi Locard, 1897: synonym of Spirotropis monterosatoi (Locard, 1897)
- Polygireulima monterosatoi : synonym of Melanella monterosatoi (Monterosato, 1890) : synonym of Melanella pyramidalis (Sowerby, 1866)
- Roxania monterosatoi Dautzenberg & H. Fischer, 1896
- Rugulina monterosatoi (van Aartsen & Bogi, 1986)
- Scala monterosatoi de Boury, 1890 : synonym of Cylindriscala acus (Watson, 1883)
- Spirotropis monterosatoi (Locard, 1897)
- Turritella monterosatoi Kobelt, 1887: synonym of Turritella turbona Monterosato, 1877

Others were given names with epithets based on his name Allery

- Chrysallida alleryi (Kobelt, 1903): synonym of Chrysallida monterosatii (Clessin, 1900)
- Evalea alleryi F. Nordsieck, 1972: synonym of Ondina scandens (Monterosato, 1884)
- Rissoa alleryi (Nordsieck, 1972)
- Solatisonax alleryi (Seguenza G., 1876)

== Bibliography ==
- 1872 Notizie intorno alle conchiglie mediterranee
- 1875. Nuova rivista delle conchiglie Mediterranee. - Atti della Reale Accademia di Scienze, Lettere e Arti di Palermo (2a) 5: 1-50. Palermo.
- 1878. Enumerazione e sinonimia delle conchiglie mediterranee. - Giornale di Scienze Naturali ed Economiche 13: 61-115. Palermo.
- 1879. Enumerazione e sinonimia delle conchiglie mediterranee. Monografia dei chitonidi del Mediterraneo. - Giornale di Scienze Naturali ed Economiche 14: 9-31. Palermo
- 1884 Nomenclatura generica e specifica di alcune conchiglie Mediterranee. - pp. 1–152. Palermo.
- 1889 Nomenclatura generica e specifica di alcune conchiglie mediterranee
- 1892 Molluschi terrestri delle isole adiacenti alla Sicilia. - Atti della Reale Accademia di Scienze, Lettere e Belle Arti di Palermo (3) 2: 1-33, [1].
- 1894 Conchiglie terrestri viventi e fossili di Monte Pellegrino. - Il Naturalista Siciliano 13 (9): 165-173. Palermo.
- 1906 Articolo sulle Auriculidae, Assiminidae [sic] e Truncatellidae dei mari d'Europa. - Il Naturalista Siciliano 18: 125-130. Palermo.
