= MarBEF Data System =

Marine Biodiversity and Ecosystem Functioning (MarBEF)
- Type of project: Academic project
- Founder: Network of Excellence
- Key people: Dutch Institute for Ecology
- Disestablished: 2009
- Funding: €8,782,025
- Status: Inactive
- Website: MarBEF home page

MarBEF Data System (Marine Biodiversity and Ecosystem Functioning) was a project of the European Union's Network of Excellence which served as a platform to integrate and disseminate knowledge and expertise on marine biodiversity, with informative links to researchers, industry, stakeholders and the general public. The program was funded by the EU and formally ended in 2009. The data system's online Register of Resources (RoR) includes the details of over 1,000 European marine biology experts and their affiliated institutions and publications.

MarBEF consisted of 94 Europe marine institutes and the work done was published in 415 scientific articles. While the initial MarBEF project has ended, work continues through numerous projects within the MarBEF "umbrella" including, the European Ocean Biogeographic Information System, the European Register of Marine Species, the European Marine Gazetteer, and includes a related Marine Biodiversity Wiki and MarBEF Open Archive.

== Organization history ==
=== Founding ===
The program was funded by the European Union (EU), with €8,707,000 coming from the European Commission and having a total cost of €8,782,025. The program was a framework for marine entities, intended to integrate and disseminate the knowledge on marine biodiversity. It was funded by the Sixth Framework Programme of the EU. MarBEF consisted of 94 European marine institutes from 24 countries and was coordinated by the Dutch Institute for Ecology (NIOO).

To accomplish its goals MarBEF participated in and/or supported multiple conferences and workshops to educate and strengthen collaboration between members of the scientific community.

=== Recent years and end ===
The program formally ended in 2009. While the initial MarBEF project has ended, work continues through numerous projects within the MarBEF "umbrella" including, the European Ocean Biogeographic Information System, the European Register of Marine Species, the European Marine Gazetteer, and includes a related Marine Biodiversity Wiki and MarBEF Open Archive.

== Related projects ==
=== European Ocean Biogeographic Information System ===
This project continued after the end of MarBEF in 2009.

=== European Marine Gazetteer ===
European Marine Gazetteer was the MarBEF database of geographic locations (names, information, maps), made available for download by the public.

=== European Register of Marine Species (ERMS) ===
The European Register of Marine Species (commonly known by the acronym ERMS) is an authoritative taxonomic list of species occurring in the European marine environment. The ERMS was founded in 1998 by grant from the EU's Marine Science and Technology Programme and the project covers species of the kingdoms Animalia, Plantae, Fungi and Protoctista occurring in the marine environment over a wide geographic range. The marine area within the scope of the ERMS includes the continental shelf seas of Europe as well as the Mediterranean shelf, Baltic Seas and deep-sea areas. The database contains the records of tens of thousands of marine species.

ERMS executive committee

The executive committee of the project includes: Dr. Mark Costello (Chief editor) of the University of Auckland, Prof. Philippe Bouchet of the Muséum national d'Histoire naturelle, Prof. Geoff Boxshall of the United Kingdom's Natural History Museum, and Mr. Ward Appeltans from UNESCO's Intergovernmental Oceanographic Commission.

==== World Register of Marine Species (WoRMS) ====
The World Register of Marine Species grew out of the ERMS. It is primarily funded by the European Union and hosted by the Flanders Marine Institute in Ostend, Belgium. WoRMS has established formal agreements with several other biodiversity projects, including the Global Biodiversity Information Facility and the Encyclopedia of Life. In 2008, WoRMS stated that it hoped to have an up-to-date record of all marine species completed by 2010, the year in which the Census of Marine Life was completed.

== See also ==
- Marine Biodiversity and Ecosystem Functioning
- Ocean Biogeographic Information System
