= Marginodostomia =

Scientific classification
- Kingdom: Animalia
- Phylum: Mollusca
- Class: Gastropoda
- Family: Pyramidellidae
- Genus: Marginodostomia; Nomura, 1936

Species
- See text

Genus of gastropods

Marginodostomia is a genus of very small sea snails, pyramidellid gastropod mollusks or micromollusks.

== Species ==
- Marginodostomia abnorma (Nomura, 1937)
- Marginodostomia charpenteri (Hornung & Mermod, 1924)
- Marginodostomia misakiensis (Nomura, 1939)
- Marginodostomia prava (Saurin, 1962)
- Marginodostomia striatissima Robba, Di Geronimo, Chaimanee, Negri & Sanfilippo, 2004
- Marginodostomia subangulata (A. Adams, 1860)
- Marginodostomia suturamarginata Nomura, 1936

Species brought into synonymy

- Marginodostomia hilgendorfi(Clessin, 1900): synonym of Odostomia hilgendorfi Clessin, 1900
- Marginodostomia improbabilis (Oberling, 1970): synonym of Odostomia improbabilis Oberling, 1970
- Marginodostomia pseudoperforata (Nomura, 1939): synonym of Megastomia pseudoperforata (Nomura, 1939)
- Marginodostomia tenera (A. Adams, 1860): synonym of Megastomia tenera (A. Adams, 1860)
- Marginodostomia verduini (Van Aartsen, 1987): synonym of Odostomia improbabilis Oberling, 1970
