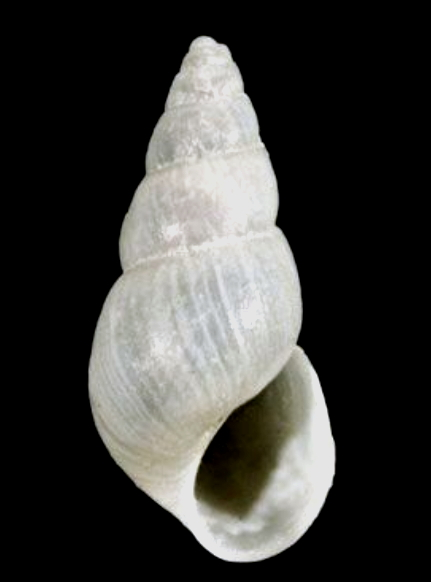
- Shell of Brachystomia eulimoides (specimen at the Natural History Museum, Rotterdam)

Scientific classification
- Kingdom: Animalia
- Phylum: Mollusca
- Class: Gastropoda
- Family: Pyramidellidae
- Genus: Brachystomia; Monterosato, 1884

Type species
- Odostomia rissoides Hanley, 1844

Synonyms
- Odontostomia (Brachystomia) Monterosato, 1884 superseded rank; Odostomia (Brachystomia) Monterosato, 1884 · accepted, alternate representation; Zastoma Iredale, 1915 (Invalid: unnecessary nom. nov. pro Brachystomia Monterosato, 1884, by Iredale treated as a junior homonym of Brachystoma J.S. Gardner, 1876.)

= Brachystomia =

Genus of gastropods

Brachystomia is a genus of sea snails, marine gastropod mollusks in the family Pyramidellidae, the pyrams and their allies.

== Description ==
(Original description in Italian) The aperture is short, and the lip is not dentate . The shells are small, polished, Rissoiform, or turriculate. There is a small tooth on the columella.

== Species ==
Species within the genus Brachystomia include:

- Brachystomia angusta (Jeffreys, 1867)
- Brachystomia bipyramidata (Nomura, 1936)
- Brachystomia carrozzai (van Aartsen, 1987)
- † Brachystomia centaurana Landau & LaFollette, 2015
- Brachystomia conica Di Luca, Güller & Zelaya, 2021
- † Brachystomia coqueberti (Le Renard, 1994)
- Brachystomia eulimoides (Hanley, 1844)
- Brachystomia hispanica Nofroni, Renda & Vannozzi, 2022
- † Brachystomia lapparenti (de Raincourt, 1885)
- Brachystomia lorellae (Micali, 1987)
- † Brachystomia lubrica (Deshayes, 1861)
- † Brachystomia lucida (Bajarunas, 1910) (accepted > unreplaced junior homonym)
- † Brachystomia miliola (Lamarck, 1804)
- Brachystomia minutiovum (Nomura, 1936)
- Brachystomia miyagiana (Nomura, 1936)
- † Brachystomia nuda (Bajarunas, 1910)
- † Brachystomia occidentalis (Gougerot, 1981)
- † Brachystomia perglobosa (Cossmann, 1913)
- Brachystomia omaensis (Nomura, 1938)
- Brachystomia perplexissima (Nomura, 1937)
- † Brachystomia physetum Lozouet, Lesport & Renard, 200
- Brachystomia pizzinii Nofroni, Renda & Vannozzi, 2022
- † Brachystomia praenominata (Cossmann, 1921)
- Brachystomia scalaris (MacGillivray, 1843)
- Brachystomia sorianoi (Peñas & Rolán, 2006)
- † Brachystomia succineiformis Guzhov, 2022
- Brachystomia tenerissima (Nomura, 1937)
- Brachystomia tenuilirata Di Luca, Güller & Zelaya, 2021
- † Brachystomia turritella (Grateloup, 1828)

Species brought into synonymy

- Brachystomia albella (Lovén, 1846): synonym of Odostomia albel (Lovén, 1846): synonym of Odostomia unidentata (Montagu, 1803) (superseded combination)
- † Brachystomia cerullii Marquet, 1997: synonym of † Ondina cerullii (Cossmann, 1921) (junior objective synonym, unnecessary replacement name, already replaced by Cossmann 1921
- Brachystomia electa (Jeffreys, 1883): synonym of Brachystomia eulimoides (Hanley, 1844)
- Brachystomia improbabilis (Oberling, 1970): synonym of Odostomia improbabilis Oberling, 1970 (superseded combination)
- Brachystomia lukisi (Jeffreys, 1859): synonym of Odostomia lukisii Jeffreys, 1859
