= Odostomia corimbensis =

Scientific classification
- Kingdom: Animalia
- Phylum: Mollusca
- Class: Gastropoda
- Family: Pyramidellidae
- Genus: Odostomia
- Species: O. corimbensis

Binomial name
- Odostomia corimbensis Schander, 1994

Species of gastropod

Odostomia corimbensis is a species of sea snail, a marine gastropod mollusc in the family Pyramidellidae, the pyrams and their allies.

This species is considered a synonym of Odostomia (Megastomia) conoidea conoidea (Brocchi, G.B., 1814)
