= Odostomia mesomorpha =

Scientific classification
- Kingdom: Animalia
- Phylum: Mollusca
- Class: Gastropoda
- Family: Pyramidellidae
- Genus: Odostomia
- Species: O. mesomorpha

Binomial name
- Odostomia mesomorpha Schander, 1994

Species of gastropod

Odostomia mesomorpha is a species of sea snail, a marine gastropod mollusc in the family Pyramidellidae, the pyrams and their allies.

== Distribution ==
This species occurs in the Atlantic Ocean off West Africa.
