= Odostomia monodon =

Scientific classification
- Kingdom: Animalia
- Phylum: Mollusca
- Class: Gastropoda
- Family: Pyramidellidae
- Genus: Odostomia
- Species: O. monodon

Binomial name
- Odostomia monodon (Requien, 1848)

Synonyms
- Eulima monodon Requien, 1848

Species of gastropod

Odostomia monodon is a species of sea snail, a marine gastropod mollusc in the family Pyramidellidae, the pyrams and their allies.

This species is considered a synonym of Odostomia conoidea
