= Turbonilla alvheimi =

Scientific classification
- Kingdom: Animalia
- Phylum: Mollusca
- Class: Gastropoda
- Family: Pyramidellidae
- Genus: Turbonilla
- Species: T. alvheimi

Binomial name
- Turbonilla alvheimi Lygre & Schander, 2010

Species of gastropod

Turbonilla alvheimi is a species of sea snail, a marine gastropod mollusk in the family Pyramidellidae, the pyrams and their allies. The species is named after Oddgeir Alvheim, a senior technician at the EAF-Nansen Programme who studied marine fauna off the coast of Africa.

== Distribution ==
This species lives in the Gulf of Guinea, West Africa.

== Description ==
The Turbonilla alvheimi has a tall, hard, milky-white cone-shaped shell, with a pointy top.
