= Monotygma fulva =

Scientific classification
- Kingdom: Animalia
- Phylum: Mollusca
- Class: Gastropoda
- Family: Amathinidae
- Genus: Monotygma
- Species: M. fulva

Binomial name
- Monotygma fulva (Adams A., 1851)

Synonyms
- List: Actaeopyramis fulva (A. Adams, 1853); Adelactaeon fulvus (A. Adams, 1853); Kleinella (Actaeopyramis) fulva (A. Adams, 1853); Monoptygma fulva A. Adams, 1853; Monotigma fulva (A. Adams, 1851)

Species of gastropod

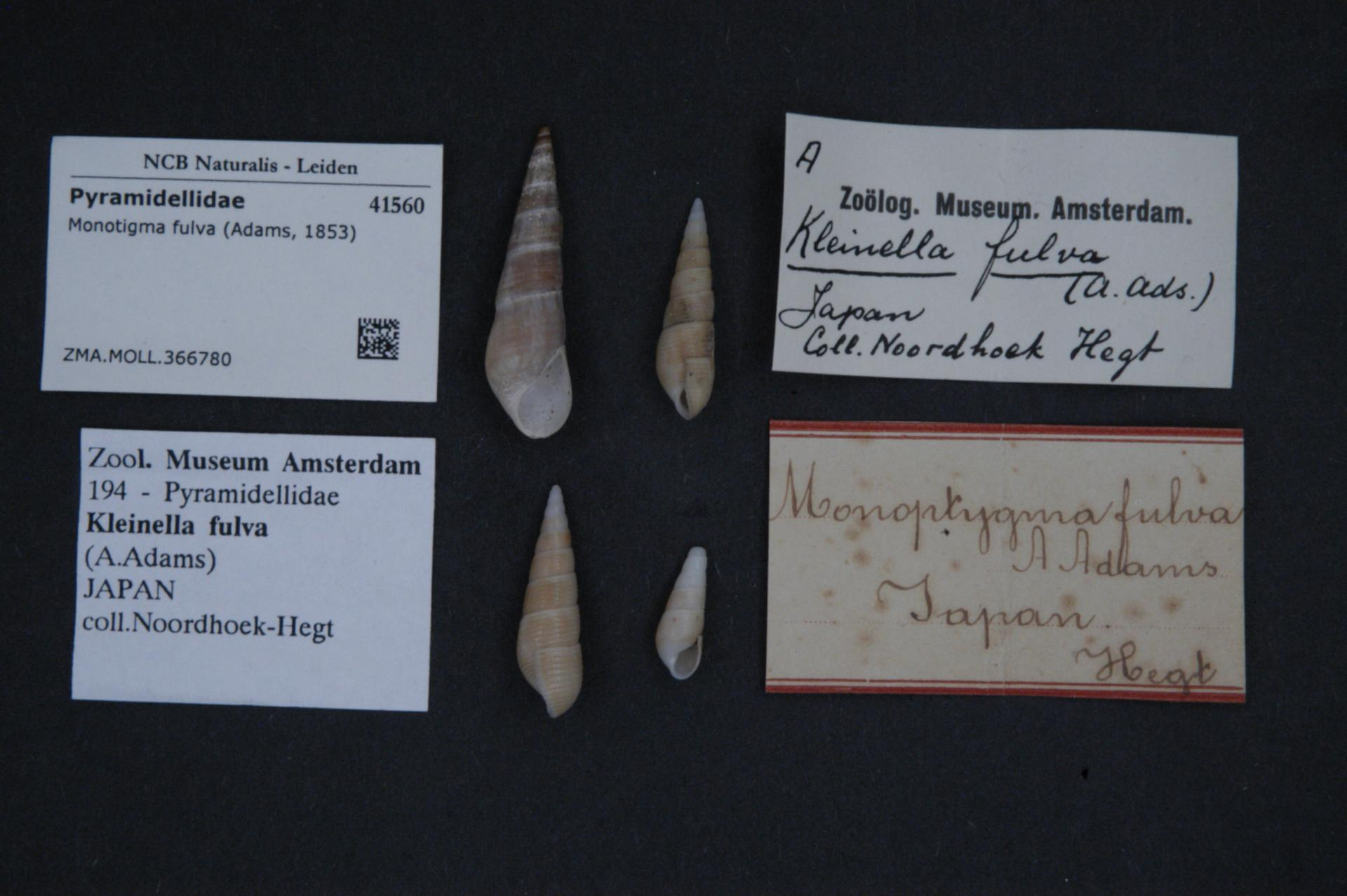
Monotigma fulva

Monotygma fulva is a species of sea snail, a marine gastropod mollusk in the family Pyramidellidae, the pyrams and their allies.
