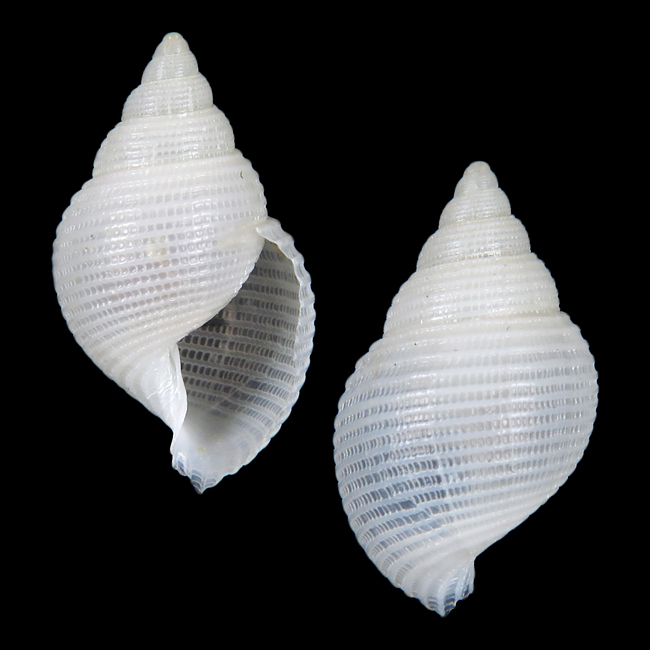

Scientific classification
- Kingdom: Animalia
- Phylum: Mollusca
- Class: Gastropoda
- Family: Amathinidae
- Genus: Leucotina
- Species: L. knopi

Binomial name
- Leucotina knopi Poppe & Tagaro, 2010

= Leucotina knopi =

Species of gastropod

Leucotina knopi is a species of sea snail, a marine gastropod mollusk in the family Amathinidae.

== Original description ==
- Poppe G. & Tagaro S. (2010) New species of Haloceratidae, Columbellidae, Buccinidae, Mitridae, Costellariidae, Amathinidae and Spondylidae from the Philippines. Visaya 3(1):73-93.
