= Afroturbonilla =

Scientific classification
- Kingdom: Animalia
- Phylum: Mollusca
- Class: Gastropoda
- Family: Pyramidellidae
- Genus: Afroturbonilla; Peñas, Rolán & Schander, 1999

Type species
- Afroturbonilla hattenbergeriana Peñas, Rolán & Schander, 1999

Genus of gastropods

Afroturbonilla is a genus of sea snails, marine gastropod mollusks in the family Pyramidellidae, the pyrams and their allies.

== Species ==
There are three known species within the genus Afroturbonilla, these include:

- Afroturbonilla engli (Peñas & Rolán, 1997)
- Afroturbonilla hattenbergeriana Peñas, Rolán & Schander, 1999
- Afroturbonilla multitudinalis Peñas & Rolán, 2002
