= Megastomia pagodiformis =

Scientific classification
- Kingdom: Animalia
- Phylum: Mollusca
- Class: Gastropoda
- Family: Pyramidellidae
- Genus: Megastomia
- Species: M. pagodiformis

Binomial name
- Megastomia pagodiformis (Schander, 1994)

Synonyms
- Odostomia pagodiformis Schander, 1994

Species of gastropod

Megastomia pagodiformis is a species of sea snail, a marine gastropod mollusk in the family Pyramidellidae, the pyrams and their allies.
