= Monotygma suturalis =

Scientific classification
- Kingdom: Animalia
- Phylum: Mollusca
- Class: Gastropoda
- Family: Amathinidae
- Genus: Monotygma
- Species: M. suturalis

Binomial name
- Monotygma suturalis (A. Adams, 1853)

Synonyms
- Monoptygma suturalis A. Adams, 1853; Monotigma suturalis (A. Adams, 1853)

Species of gastropod

Monotygma suturalis is a species of sea snail, a marine gastropod mollusk in the family Pyramidellidae, the pyrams and their allies.
