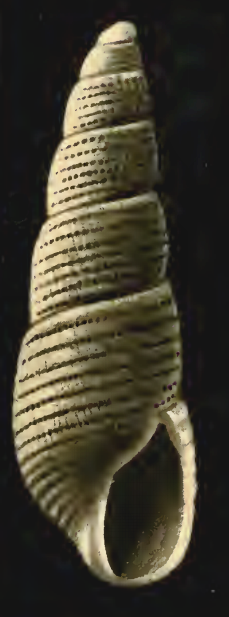
- Shell

Scientific classification
- Kingdom: Animalia
- Phylum: Mollusca
- Class: Gastropoda
- Family: Amathinidae
- Genus: Monotygma
- Species: M. lauta

Binomial name
- Monotygma lauta A. Adams, 1853

Synonyms
- Monoptygma lauta A. Adams, 1853; Monotigma lauta (A. Adams, 1853); Pyramidella (Actaeopyramis) lauta (A. Adams, 1853)

= Monotygma lauta =

Species of gastropod

Monotygma lauta is a species of sea snail, a marine gastropod mollusk in the family Pyramidellidae, the pyrams and their allies.

== Description ==
The rather stout, milky white shell is subturrited and has a broadly elongate-conic shape. The length of the shell is 7 mm. The whorls of the protoconch are small. They are almost completely immersed in the first succeeding whorl. Only the tilted edge of two volutions is apparent, which indicates that the axis of whorls of the protoconch is at right angles to the axis of the later ones. The 6¾ whorls of the teleoconch are inflated, strongly shouldered at the summit, and decidedly rounded. They are marked by many weak, irregular axial riblets and very strong, broad, angular, incised, spiral channels. These are crossed by many more or less regularly spaced and subequally developed backward slanting axial riblets. These riblets render the flattened and faintly spirally striated, raised spaces between the incised channels feebly crenulated on both edges. Five incised channels appear between the sutures on the second and third whorl and six on the fourth and fifth. The periphery and the base of the body whorl are well rounded, the latter sculptured like the space between the sutures, with six spiral channels. The suboval aperture is quite large. The posterior angle is obtuse. The thin outer lip is denticulate. The incised spiral channels appear as a chain of squarish areolations within, by transmitted light. The columella is moderately strong, somewhat twisted and slightly reflected with a subobsolete oblique fold near its insertion. The parietal wall is covered by a very feeble callus.

== Distribution ==
This marine species occurs off Japan. It has also been found as a migrant in the Mediterranean Sea.
