= Megastomia boteroi =

Scientific classification
- Kingdom: Animalia
- Phylum: Mollusca
- Class: Gastropoda
- Family: Pyramidellidae
- Genus: Megastomia
- Species: M. boteroi

Binomial name
- Megastomia boteroi (Schander, 1994)

Species of gastropod

Megastomia boteroi is a species of sea snail, a marine gastropod mollusk in the family Pyramidellidae, the pyrams and their allies.

== Description ==
The size of the shell attains 4 mm.

== Distribution ==
This species occurs in the Atlantic Ocean off Senegal.
