= Megastomia corimbensis =

Scientific classification
- Kingdom: Animalia
- Phylum: Mollusca
- Class: Gastropoda
- Family: Pyramidellidae
- Genus: Megastomia
- Species: M. corimbensis

Binomial name
- Megastomia corimbensis (Schander, 1994)

Synonyms
- Odostomia (Megastomia) corimbensis Schander, 1994

Species of gastropod

Megastomia corimbensis is a species of sea snail, a marine gastropod mollusk in the family Pyramidellidae, the pyrams and their allies.

== Distribution ==
This species occurs in the following locations:

- Angola
- Cape Verde
- Europe
- São Tomé and Príncipe
