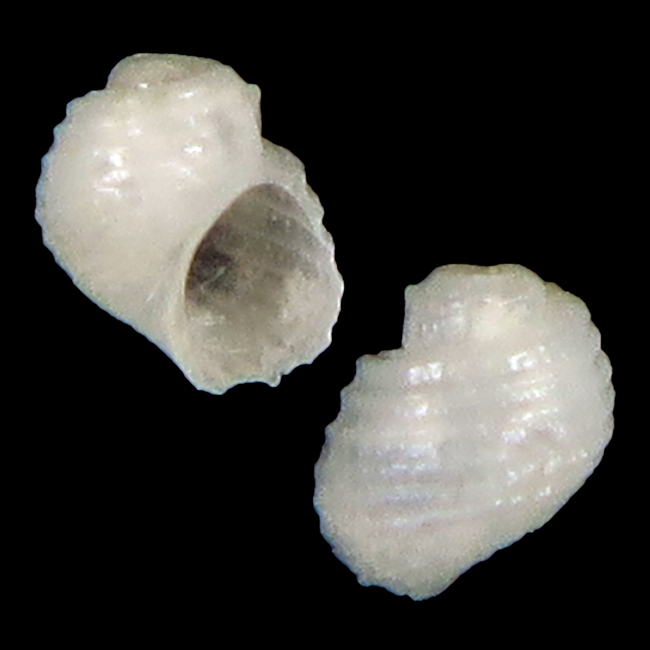

Scientific classification
- Kingdom: Animalia
- Phylum: Mollusca
- Class: Gastropoda
- Family: Amathinidae
- Genus: Iselica
- Species: I. alta

Binomial name
- Iselica alta Poppe, Tagaro & Goto, 2018

= Iselica alta =

Species of gastropod

Iselica alta is a species of sea snail, a marine gastropod mollusc in the family Amathinidae.

== Description ==
The length of the shell attains 1.4 mm.

== Original Description ==
- (of Iselica altum Poppe, Tagaro & Goto, 2018) Poppe G.T., Tagaro S.P. & Goto Y. (2018). New marine species from the Central Philippines. Visaya. 5(1): 91-135. page(s): 114, pl. 14 figs 4–5.

== Distribution ==
This marine species occurs in benthic zones off the Philippines.
