= Clathrella =

Clathrella may refer to:

- Clathrella (protist), a genus of protists in the family Clathrellidae
- Clathrella, a genus of gastropods in the family Amathinidae, synonym of Carinorbis
- Clathrella, a genus of fungi in the family Phallaceae, synonym of Clathrus
