= Monotygma pareximia =

Scientific classification
- Kingdom: Animalia
- Phylum: Mollusca
- Class: Gastropoda
- Family: Amathinidae
- Genus: Monotygma
- Species: M. pareximia

Binomial name
- Monotygma pareximia (Nomura, 1936)

Synonyms
- Monotigma pareximia (Nomura, 1936); Actaeopyramis pareximia Nomura, 1936

Species of gastropod

Monotygma pareximia is a species of sea snail, a marine gastropod mollusk in the family Pyramidellidae, the pyrams and their allies.
