= Turbonilla kerstinae =

Scientific classification
- Kingdom: Animalia
- Phylum: Mollusca
- Class: Gastropoda
- Family: Pyramidellidae
- Genus: Turbonilla
- Species: T. kerstinae

Binomial name
- Turbonilla kerstinae Schander, 1994

Species of mollusc

Turbonilla kerstinae is a species of sea snail, a marine gastropod mollusk in the family Pyramidellidae, the pyrams and their allies.

== Description ==
The shell grows to a length of 3.5 mm.

== Distribution ==
This marine species occurs in the following locations:

- Angola
- Cape Verde
- Mauritania
