= Turbonilla pleijeli =

Scientific classification
- Kingdom: Animalia
- Phylum: Mollusca
- Class: Gastropoda
- Family: Pyramidellidae
- Genus: Turbonilla
- Species: T. pleijeli

Binomial name
- Turbonilla pleijeli Schander, 1994

Species of gastropod

Turbonilla pleijeli is a species of sea snail, a marine gastropod mollusk in the family Pyramidellidae, the pyrams and their allies.
