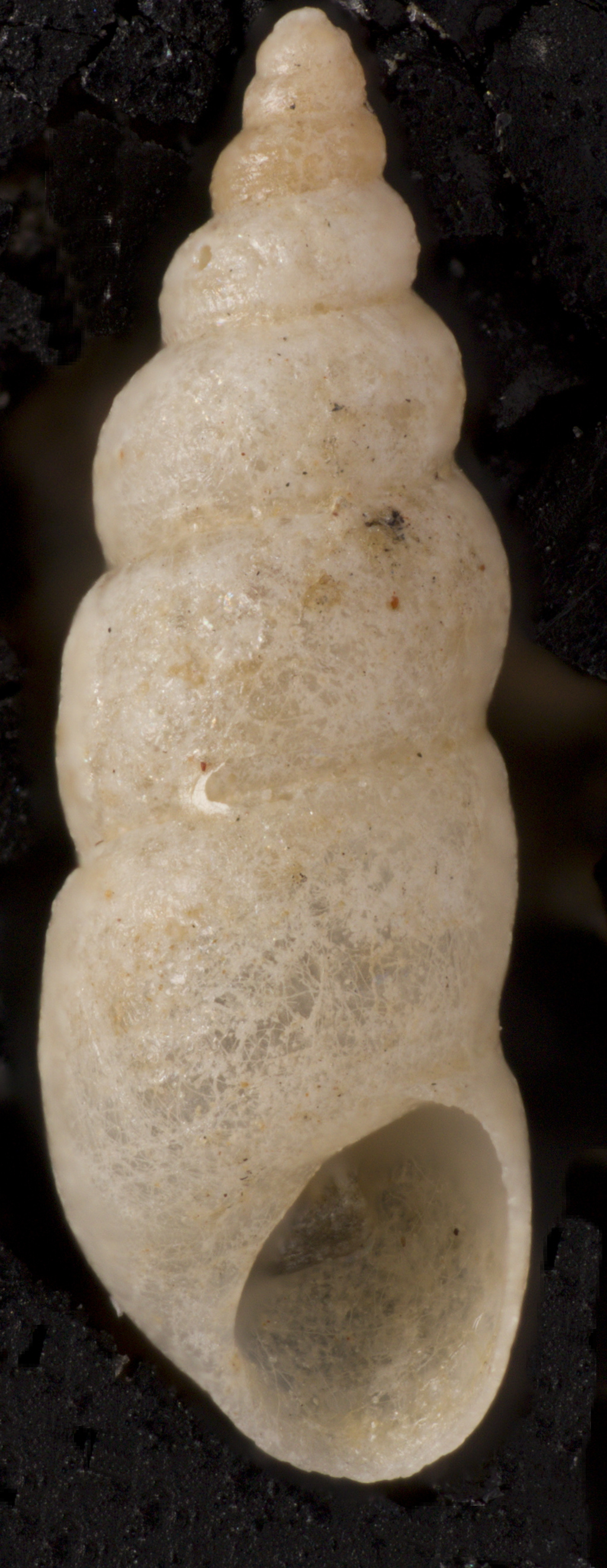
- Shell of Monotygma julii (syntype at MNHN, Paris)

Scientific classification
- Kingdom: Animalia
- Phylum: Mollusca
- Class: Gastropoda
- Subcohort: Panpulmonata
- Superfamily: Pyramidelloidea
- Family: Amathinidae
- Genus: Monotygma; G.B. Sowerby II, 1839

Type species
- Monotygma striata Gray, 1847

Synonyms
- List: Actaeopyramis P. Fischer, 1885; Kleinella (Actaeopyramis) P. Fischer, 1885; Monoptygma Lea, 1833 sensu A. Adams, 1853; Monotigma G.B. Sowerby II, 1839; Pyramidella (Actaeopyramis) P. Fischer, 1885

= Monotygma =

Genus of gastropods

Monotygma is a genus of sea snails, marine gastropod mollusks in the family Pyramidellidae, the pyrams and their allies. The status of this genus was for a long time confused, but the situation was clarified in a review by van Aartsen (1986).

== Life habits ==
Little is known about the biology of the members of this genus. As is true of most members of the Pyramidellidae sensu lato, they are most likely to be ectoparasites.

== Species ==
The following species are recognised in the genus Monotygma:

- Monotygma acuminata (Gould, 1861)
- Monotygma amoena (A. Adams, 1853)
- Monotygma caelata (A. Adams, 1861)
- Monotygma elata (Koenen, 1882) †
- Monotygma enosima (Clessin, 1902)
- Monotygma eximia (Lischke, 1872)
- Monotygma fulva (A. Adams, 1853)
- Monotygma granulata (A. Adams, 1853)
- † Monotygma ivolasi (Mayer-Eymar 1900)
- Monotygma julii (Saurin, 1959)
- Monotygma lauta (A. Adams, 1853)
- † Monotygma marcusseni (Schnetler, 2001)
- Monotygma metula (A. Adams, 1861)
- Monotygma pareximia (Nomura, 1936)
- Monotygma puncticulata (Gould, 1861)
- Monotygma punctigera (A. Adams, 1861)
- Monotygma sinuata (Gould, 1861)
- Monotygma striata Gray, 1847
- Monotygma suturalis (A. Adams, 1853)
- Monotygma watsoni (Hornung & Mermod, 1927)

Synonyms

- Monotygma casta (A. Adams, 1853): synonym of Leucotina casta (A. Adams, 1853) (superseded combination)
- Monotygma concinna (A. Adams, 1854): synonym of Leucotina casta (A. Adams, 1853) (superseded combination)
- Monotygma gavisa (Melvill, 1896): synonym of Rissopsetia gavisa (Melvill, 1896)
- Monotygma modesta (de Folin, 1870): synonym of Careliopsis modesta (de Folin, 1870)
- Monotygma pura (A. Adams, 1854): synonym of Leucotina casta (A. Adams, 1853) (unaccepted > junior subjective synonym)
