= Megastomia subscripta =

Scientific classification
- Kingdom: Animalia
- Phylum: Mollusca
- Class: Gastropoda
- Family: Pyramidellidae
- Genus: Megastomia
- Species: M. subscripta

Binomial name
- Megastomia subscripta Schander, 1994

Synonyms
- Odostomia (Auristomia) subscripta Schander C., 1994

Species of gastropod

Megastomia subscripta is a species of sea snail, a marine gastropod mollusc in the family Pyramidellidae, the pyrams and their allies.

== Distribution ==
This species occurs in the Atlantic Ocean off West Africa.
