= Afroturbonilla hattenbergeriana =

Scientific classification
- Kingdom: Animalia
- Phylum: Mollusca
- Class: Gastropoda
- Family: Pyramidellidae
- Genus: Afroturbonilla
- Species: A. hattenbergeriana

Binomial name
- Afroturbonilla hattenbergeriana Peñas, Rolán & Schander, 1999

Species of gastropod

Afroturbonilla hattenbergeriana is a species of sea snail, a marine gastropod mollusk in the family Pyramidellidae, the pyrams and their allies.

This species is one of three other species within the Afroturbonilla genus, with the exception of the others being Afroturbonilla engli and Afroturbonilla multitudinalis.

== Distribution ==
This species occurs within the Atlantic Ocean off Guinea and the west coast of Angola.
