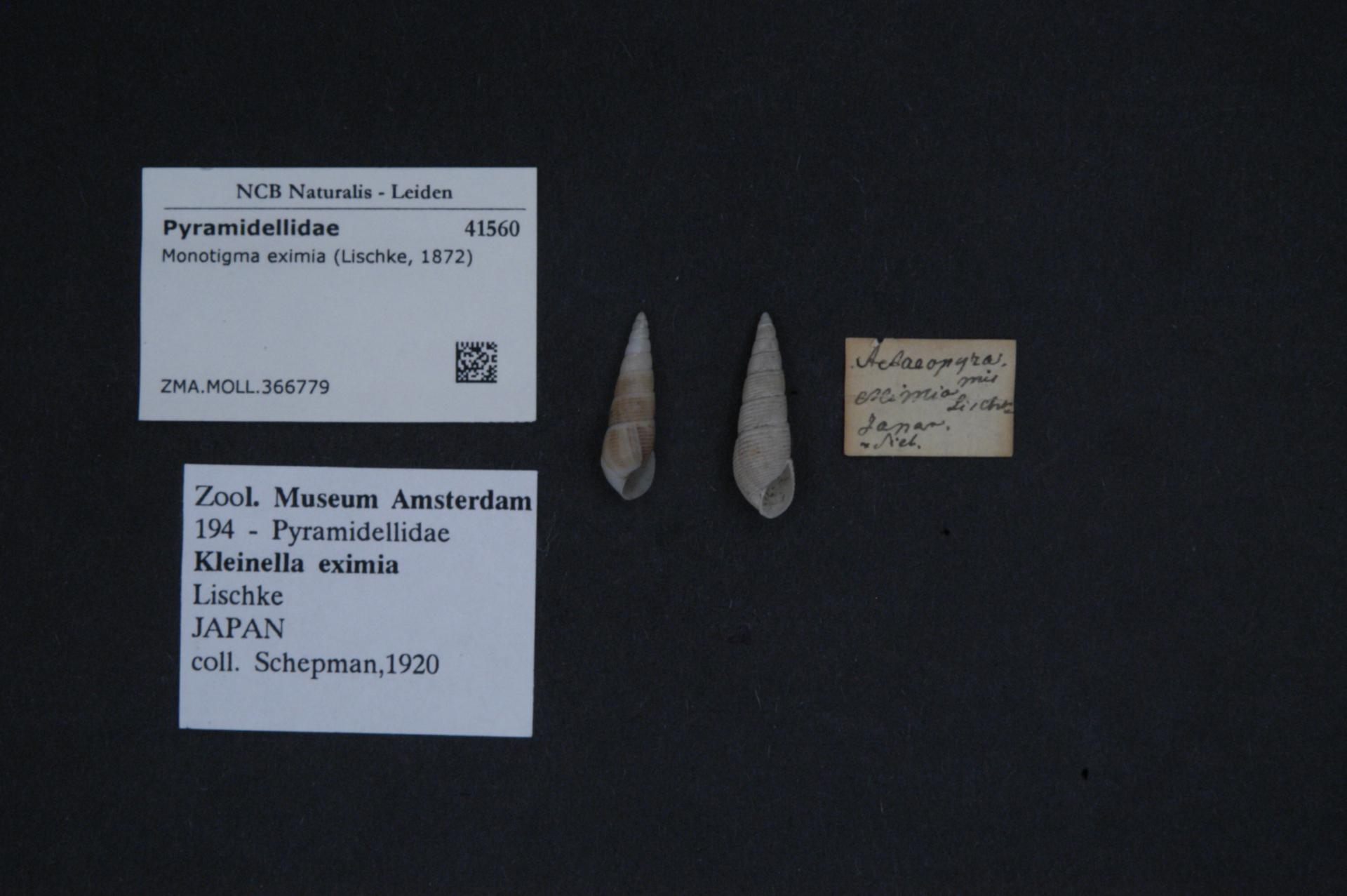

Scientific classification
- Kingdom: Animalia
- Phylum: Mollusca
- Class: Gastropoda
- Family: Amathinidae
- Genus: Monotygma
- Species: M. eximia

Binomial name
- Monotygma eximia (Lischke, 1872)

Synonyms
- Actaeopyramis eximia (Lischke, 1872); Monoptygma eximium Lischke, 1872; Monotigma eximia (Lischke, 1872)

= Monotygma eximia =

Species of mollusc

Monotygma eximia is a species of sea snail, a marine gastropod mollusk in the family Pyramidellidae, the pyrams and their allies.
