= Leucotina micra =

Scientific classification
- Kingdom: Animalia
- Phylum: Mollusca
- Class: Gastropoda
- Family: Amathinidae
- Genus: Leucotina
- Species: L. micra

Binomial name
- Leucotina micra (Pritchard & Gatliff, 1900)

Synonyms
- Odostomia micra Pritchard & Gatliff, 1900; Odostomia punctospira Tate & May, 1900; Odostomia (Evalea) micra Pritchard & Gatliff, 1900; Turbonilla (Ondina) micra Pritchard & Gatliff, 1900

Species of gastropod

Leucotina micra, the tiny pyramid-shell, is a species of sea snail, a marine gastropod mollusk in the family Amathinidae, the pyrams and their allies.

== Description ==
The length of the shell measures 2 mm.

== Distribution ==
This endemic species occurs in the littoral zone and offshore off Tasmania, and Victoria.
