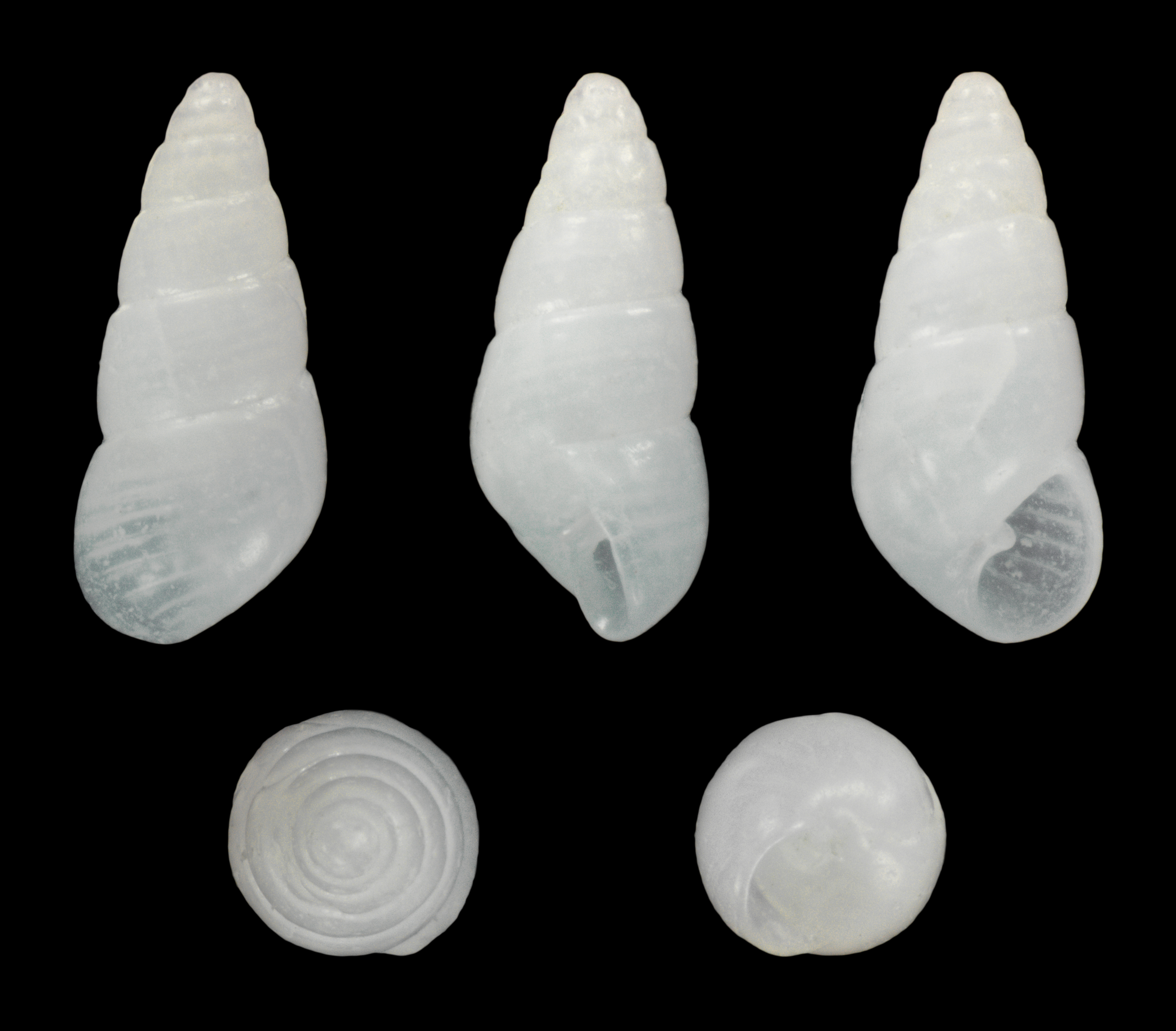
- Megastomia tenera

Scientific classification
- Kingdom: Animalia
- Phylum: Mollusca
- Class: Gastropoda
- Family: Pyramidellidae
- Genus: Megastomia; Monterosato, 1884

Synonyms
- † Evelynella Laws, 1940; Odostomia (Megastomia) Monterosato, 1884; Stomega Dall & Bartsch, 1904 (unnecessary replacement name for Megastomia)

= Megastomia =

Genus of gastropods

Megastomia is a genus of sea snails, marine gastropod mollusks in the family Pyramidellidae, the pyrams and their allies.

== Taxonomy ==
Over fifty species worldwide have been placed in (sub)genus Megastomia Monterosato, 1884 by a number of authors (e.g. Saurin, 1959, 1962; Peñas & Rolán, 1999; Giannuzzi-Savelli et al. (2014). On the basis of 16s mtDNA sequence data, Schander et al. (2003) distinguished, and placed in Megastomia, two species (M. conoidea (Brocchi, 1814) and M. corimbensis (Schander, 1994)), which clustered separately from other species placed in Odostomia Fleming, 1813. However Høisæter (2014: 34) correctly pointed out that the type species Odostomia conspicua Alder, 1850 "is a typical Odostomia s.s. and has few traits in common with O. conoidea". Considering the large number of species involved, and considering that for most of these species Odostomia is probably not more appropriate, the published combinations with Megastomia are nevertheless retained by the database WoRMS as "accepted" until more data become available.

== Species ==
Species within the genus Megastomia include:

- Megastomia adiposa (Laseron, 1959)
- Megastomia adolphi (Saurin, 1959)
- Megastomia algoensis (Thiele, 1925)
- Megastomia aliter Penas & Rolan, 1999
- Megastomia alungata (Nordsieck, 1972)
- Megastomia ampliata (Saurin, 1962)
- Megastomia atrisaxi (Saurin, 1959)
- Megastomia bedoti (Hornung & Mermod, 1924)
- Megastomia binhdinhensis (Saurin, 1958)
- Megastomia boteroi (Schander, 1994)
- Megastomia broti (Hornung & Mermod, 1924)
- Megastomia canaria (Hedley, 1907)
- Megastomia canina Penas & Rolan, 1999
- Megastomia caudana (Saurin, 1959)
- Megastomia charneri (Saurin, 1959)
- Megastomia clara (Nomura, 1936)
- Megastomia conoidea (Brocchi, 1814)
- Megastomia conspicua (Alder, 1850)
- Megastomia corimbensis Schander, 1994
- Megastomia coseli Penas & Rolan, 1999
- Megastomia desmiti (van Aartsen, Gittenberger & Goud, 1998)
- † Megastomia doliella (Laws, 1940)
- Megastomia gea (Bartsch, 1915)
- Megastomia gestroi (Hornung & Mermod, 1924)
- Megastomia gestroides (Saurin, 1958)
- Megastomia gilsoni (Dautzenberg, 1912)
- Megastomia gordonis (Yokoyama, 1922)
- Megastomia gutta Penas & Rolan, 1999
- Megastomia interolineata (Nomura, 1936)
- Megastomia jacundior (Nomura, 1937)
- † Megastomia kaawa (Laws, 1940)
- Megastomia kamakurana (Nomura, 1938)
- Megastomia kuroshiwo (Nomura, 1939)
- Megastomia makiyamai (Nomura, 1937)
- † Megastomia marginalis (Laws, 1940)
- Megastomia martinae (Saurin, 1959)
- Megastomia metayei (Saurin, 1959)
- Megastomia miuraensis (Nomura, 1937)
- Megastomia neoexigua (Nomura, 1937)
- Megastomia nhatrangensis (Saurin, 1959)
- Megastomia pagodiformis (Schander, 1994)
- Megastomia palmaensis Penas & Rolan, 1999
- Megastomia pernettae (Saurin, 1959)
- Megastomia pseudoperforata (Nomura, 1939)
- Megastomia pyramidata (Laseron, 1951)
- Megastomia regina (Thiele, 1925)
- Megastomia ruris Penas & Rolan, 1999
- Megastomia sagamiana (Nomura, 1937)
- Megastomia saurini (Corgan & Van Aartsen, 1998)
- Megastomia serenei (Saurin, 1959)
- † Megastomia simemacula (Laws, 1940)
- Megastomia simplex (Angas, 1871)
- Megastomia sitirighamana (Nomura, 1938)
- Megastomia subcarina (Laseron, 1951)
- Megastomia subcostata (Saurin, 1959)
- Megastomia subscripta (Schander, 1994)
- Megastomia sulcifera (E.A. Smith, 1871)
- Megastomia supramarginata (Saurin, 1959)
- Megastomia tenera (A. Adams, 1860)
- Megastomia troncosoi Peñas & Rolán, 2002
- Megastomia turbiniformis Penas & Rolan, 1999
- Megastomia turukoae Nomura, 1938
- Megastomia unifilosa (Saurin, 1962)
- † Megastomia venusta (Laws, 1940)
- Megastomia vero (Nomura, 1937)
- Megastomia winfriedi Penas & Rolan, 1999
- Megastomia yabehisakatsui (Nomura, 1936)
- Megastomia yukikoae (Nomura, 1938)
- Megastomia zaleuca (Melvill, 1910)
- Megastomia zijpi (van Aartsen, Gittenberger & Goud, 1998)

The following species were brought into synonymy:

- Megastomia elata (Saurin, 1958): synonym of Megastomia saurini (Corgan & Van Aartsen, 1998)
- Megastomia conoidea (Brocchi, 1884: synonym of Odostomia conoidea (Brocchi, 1814)
- Megastomia conspicua (Alder, 1850): synonym of Odostomia conspicua Alder, 1850
