= Turbonilla anselmopenasi =

Scientific classification
- Kingdom: Animalia
- Phylum: Mollusca
- Class: Gastropoda
- Family: Pyramidellidae
- Genus: Turbonilla
- Species: T. anselmopenasi

Binomial name
- Turbonilla anselmopenasi Lygre & Schander, 2010

Species of gastropod

Turbonilla anselmopenasi is a species of sea snail, a marine gastropod mollusk in the family Pyramidellidae, the pyrams and their allies.

== Distribution ==
This species occurs in the Gulf of Guinea, West Africa.
