= Marginodostomia striatissima =

Scientific classification
- Kingdom: Animalia
- Phylum: Mollusca
- Class: Gastropoda
- Family: Pyramidellidae
- Genus: Marginodostomia
- Species: M. striatissima

Binomial name
- Marginodostomia striatissima Robba, Di Geronimo, Chaimanee, Negri & Sanfilippo, 2004

Species of gastropod

Marginodostomia striatissima is a species of sea snail, a marine gastropod mollusk in the family Pyramidellidae, the pyrams and their allies.
