= Megastomia zijpi =

Scientific classification
- Kingdom: Animalia
- Phylum: Mollusca
- Class: Gastropoda
- Family: Pyramidellidae
- Genus: Megastomia
- Species: M. zijpi

Binomial name
- Megastomia zijpi (van Aartsen, Gittenberger E. & Goud, 1998)

Synonyms
- Odostomia (Megastomia) zijpi van Aartsen, Gittenberger E. & Goud, 1998

Species of gastropod

Megastomia zijpi is a species of sea snail, a marine gastropod mollusk in the family Pyramidellidae, the pyrams and their allies.

== Description ==
The length of the shell varies between 1.8 mm and 2.1 mm.

== Distribution ==
This species occurs in the Atlantic Ocean off Mauritania.
