= Megastomia simplex =

Simple pyramid shell
- Drawing of a shell of Syrnola simplex

Scientific classification
- Kingdom: Animalia
- Phylum: Mollusca
- Class: Gastropoda
- Family: Pyramidellidae
- Genus: Megastomia
- Species: M. simplex

Binomial name
- Megastomia simplex (Angas, 1871)

Synonyms
- Agatha simplex (Angas, 1871) ·; Odostomia simplex Angas, 1871; Syrnola (Agatha) simplex (Angas, 1871)

Species of gastropod

Megastomia simplex, common name the simple pyramid shell, is a species of sea snail, a marine gastropod mollusk in the family Pyramidellidae, the pyrams and their allies.

== Description ==
The white, rather solid shell has a smooth appearance. The length of the shell measures 4 millimetres (0.16 in). The teleoconch contains 7½ rather flat whorls . They are a little angulated at the suture. The aperture is lirate within. Its plait is sharp and transverse.

== Distribution ==
The type specimen of this marine species was found off Port Jackson, New South Wales, Australia.
