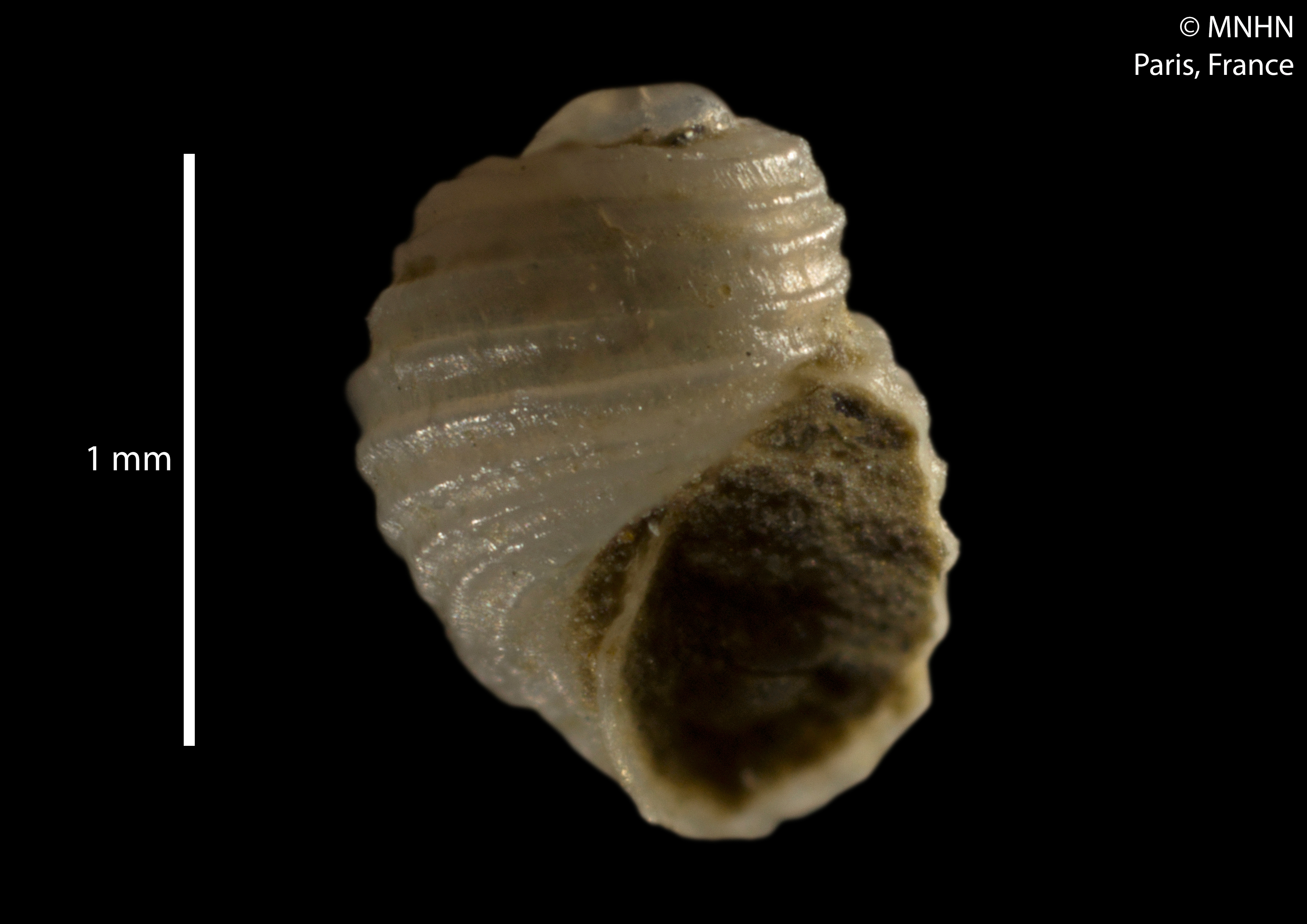
- Shell of Iselica alta (paratype at MNHN, Paris)

Scientific classification
- Kingdom: Animalia
- Phylum: Mollusca
- Class: Gastropoda
- Subcohort: Panpulmonata
- Superfamily: Pyramidelloidea
- Family: Amathinidae
- Genus: Iselica; Dall, 1918

Type species
- Narica anomala C. B. Adams, 1850

Synonyms
- Isapis H. Adams & A. Adams, 1854 (Invalid: junior homonym of Isapis Doubleday, 1847 [Lepidoptera]; Iselica is a replacement name)

= Iselica =

Genus of gastropods

Iselica is a genus of small sea snails, marine heterobranch gastropod molluscs or micromolluscs in the family Amathinidae.

== Species ==
Species within the genus Iselica include:

- Iselica alta Poppe, Tagaro & Goto, 2018
- Iselica carotica Marincovich, 1973
- Iselica chilensis Marincovich, 1973
- Iselica fenestrata (Carpenter, 1864)
- Iselica globosa (H. C. Lea, 1843)
- Iselica kochi A. M. Strong & Hertlein, 1939
- Iselica maculosa (Carpenter, 1857)
- Iselica obtusa (Carpenter, 1864)
- Iselica ovoidea (Gould, 1853)

Species brought into synonymy

- Iselica altum Poppe, Tagaro & Goto, 2018: synonym of Iselica alta Poppe, Tagaro & Goto, 2018 (incorrect gender agreement of specific epithet)
- Iselica anomala (C. B. Adams, 1850): synonym of Iselica globosa (H. C. Lea, 1843)
- Iselica laxa Dall, 1919: synonym of Iselica obtusa (Carpenter, 1864)
