= Megastomia troncosoi =

Scientific classification
- Kingdom: Animalia
- Phylum: Mollusca
- Class: Gastropoda
- Family: Pyramidellidae
- Genus: Megastomia
- Species: M. troncosoi

Binomial name
- Megastomia troncosoi Peñas & Rolán, 2002

Species of gastropod

Megastomia troncosoi is a species of sea snail, a marine gastropod mollusk in the family Pyramidellidae, the pyrams and their allies.

== Distribution ==
This species occurs in the Atlantic Ocean off Guinea-Bissau.
