= Afroturbonilla engli =

Scientific classification
- Kingdom: Animalia
- Phylum: Mollusca
- Class: Gastropoda
- Family: Pyramidellidae
- Genus: Afroturbonilla
- Species: A. engli

Binomial name
- Afroturbonilla engli (Peñas & Rolán, 1997)

Synonyms
- Turbonilla engli Peñas & Rolán, 1997

Species of gastropod

Afroturbonilla engli is a species of sea snail, a marine gastropod mollusk in the family Pyramidellidae, the pyrams and their allies.

This species is one of three other species within the Afroturbonilla genus, with the exception of the others being Afroturbonilla hattenbergeriana and Afroturbonilla multitudinalis.

== Distribution ==
The marine species occurs in the Atlantic Ocean off São Tomé and Príncipe.
