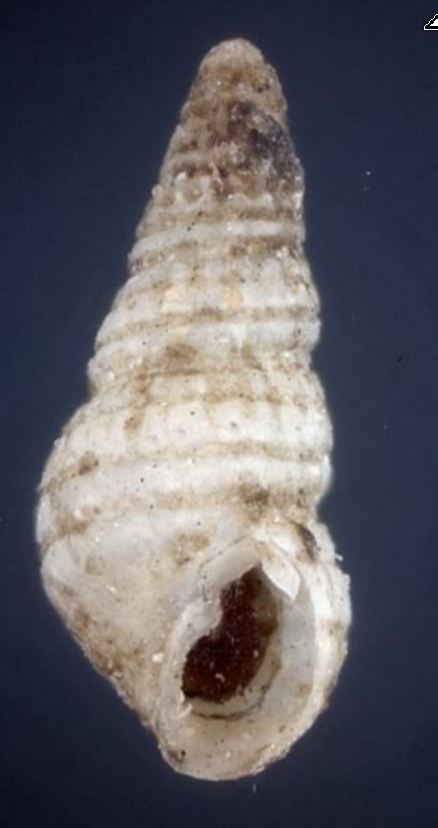
- Shell of Leucotina casta (specimen at Museums Victoria)

Scientific classification
- Kingdom: Animalia
- Phylum: Mollusca
- Class: Gastropoda
- Superfamily: Pyramidelloidea
- Family: Amathinidae
- Genus: Leucotina
- Species: L. casta

Binomial name
- Leucotina casta (A.Adams, 1853)
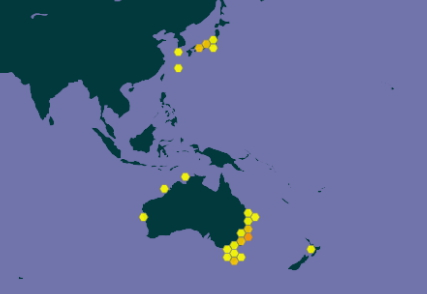

Synonyms
- Actaeon dianae A. Adams, 1855; † Actaeon praestitus H. J. Finlay, 1924 (junior subjective synonym); Actaeopyramis casta (A. Adams, 1853); Acteon austrinus R. B. Watson, 1883; Acteon dianae (A. Adams, 1855); Acteon huttoni Cossmann, 1895 · unaccepted; Acteon praestitus H. J. Finlay, 1924; † Admete ambigua F. W. Hutton, 1885 (junior subjective synonym); Fossarus bulimoides Tenison Woods, 1877; † Leucotina ambigua (F. W. Hutton, 1885) (junior subjective synonym); Leucotina dianae (A. Adams, 1855); Leucotina esther Angas, 1867; Leucotina niphonensis A. Adams, 1860; Monoptygma casta A. Adams, 1853 (superseded combination); Monoptygma concinna A. Adams, 1854 (misspelling of genus); Monoptygma pura A. Adams, 1854 (junior subjective synonym); Monotygma casta (A. Adams, 1853) superseded combination; Monotygma concinna (A. Adams, 1854) superseded combination; Monotygma pura (A. Adams, 1854) junior subjective synonym; Odostomia gigantea Dunker, 1877; † Odostomia sulcata F. W. Hutton, 1885 (invalid: junior primary homonym...); Rissoa punctatostriata Tenison Woods, 1879; † Tenuiactaeon ambiguus (F. W. Hutton, 1885)

= Leucotina casta =

Species of gastropod

Leucotina casta is a species of gastropods belonging to the family Amathinidae.

== Description ==
(Described as Acteon austrinus) The small, thin shell is ovate. It is strongly striated, with a high conical spire, a blunt tip, and a tumid body whorl.

Sculpture : Longitudinals: the lines of growth are very faint and somewhat markedly oblique. Spirals: the whole surface is scored with strong equal furrows which are about half the breadth of the interstices. These furrow are not stippled, but are delicately and regularly cut across on the lines of growth by fine threads. There are about 20 of these furrows on the body and about 9 on the penultimate whorl.

The colour of the shell is porcellanous, with a glossy surface.

The rather high spire is conical and subscalar. The protoconch is rather large, blunt and flattened. It has a very slight inversion of the extreme tip. There are nearly five whorls, very little convex. The body whorl is rather large and somewhat tumid. The slight suture is rather oblique and scarcely impressed. The aperture is oval, pointed above and a little oblique in its direction. The outer lip is sharp and thin, with its edge crenulated by the sculptural spirals. In direction it is straight above, well curved on the base, where it is very slightly emarginate. The inner lip is very slightly convex on the body. It passes gradually into the short concave columella, at the base of which there is only the faintest trace of a tooth. Its edge is sharp and patulous, with a minute chink behind it.

== Distribution ==
The marine species is found in Australia, New Zealand, Korea, Taiwan and Japan.
