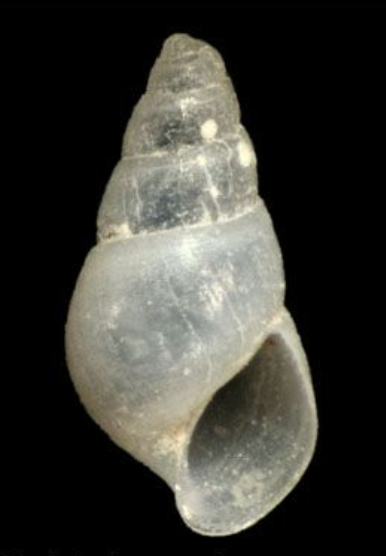
- Shell of Brachystomia carrozzai (specimen at the Natural History Museum, Rotterdam)

Scientific classification
- Kingdom: Animalia
- Phylum: Mollusca
- Class: Gastropoda
- Family: Pyramidellidae
- Genus: Brachystomia
- Species: B. carrozzai

Binomial name
- Brachystomia carrozzai (van Aartsen, 1987)

Synonyms
- Odostomia (Brachystomia) carrozzai (Aartsen, 1987); Odostomia albella auct.non Lovén, S.L., 1846; Odostomia carrozzai van Aartsen, 1987 · accepted, alternate representation

= Brachystomia carrozzai =

Species of gastropod

Brachystomia carrozzai is a species of sea snail, a marine gastropod mollusk in the family Pyramidellidae, the pyrams and their allies.

== Description ==
The size of the shell varies between 2.2 mm and 3.8 mm.

== Distribution ==
This species occurs in the following locations:

- European waters (ERMS scope)
- Portuguese Exclusive Economic Zone
- Spanish Exclusive Economic Zone
- United Kingdom Exclusive Economic Zone
- Mediterranean Sea
