= Megastomia canina =

Scientific classification
- Kingdom: Animalia
- Phylum: Mollusca
- Class: Gastropoda
- Family: Pyramidellidae
- Genus: Megastomia
- Species: M. canina

Binomial name
- Megastomia canina Penas & Rolan, 1999

Species of gastropod

Megastomia canina is a species of sea snail, a marine gastropod mollusk in the family Pyramidellidae; this family is often referred to as the pyrams and their allies.
