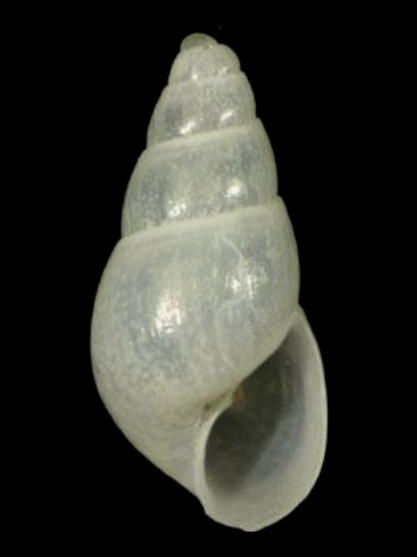
- Shell of Brachystomia angusta (specimen at the Natural History Museum, Rotterdam)

Scientific classification
- Kingdom: Animalia
- Phylum: Mollusca
- Class: Gastropoda
- Family: Pyramidellidae
- Genus: Brachystomia
- Species: B. angusta

Binomial name
- Brachystomia angusta (Jeffreys, 1867)

Synonyms
- Odostomia angusta Jeffreys, 1867

= Brachystomia angusta =

Species of gastropod

Brachystomia angusta is a species of sea snail, a marine gastropod mollusk in the family Pyramidellidae, the pyrams and their allies.

== Distribution ==
This species occurs in the following locations:

- Canary Islands
- Cape Verde
- Europe
- European waters (ERMS scope)
- Mauritania
- Mediterranean Sea
- Portuguese Exclusive Economic Zone
- Spanish Exclusive Economic Zone
- United Kingdom Exclusive Economic Zone
