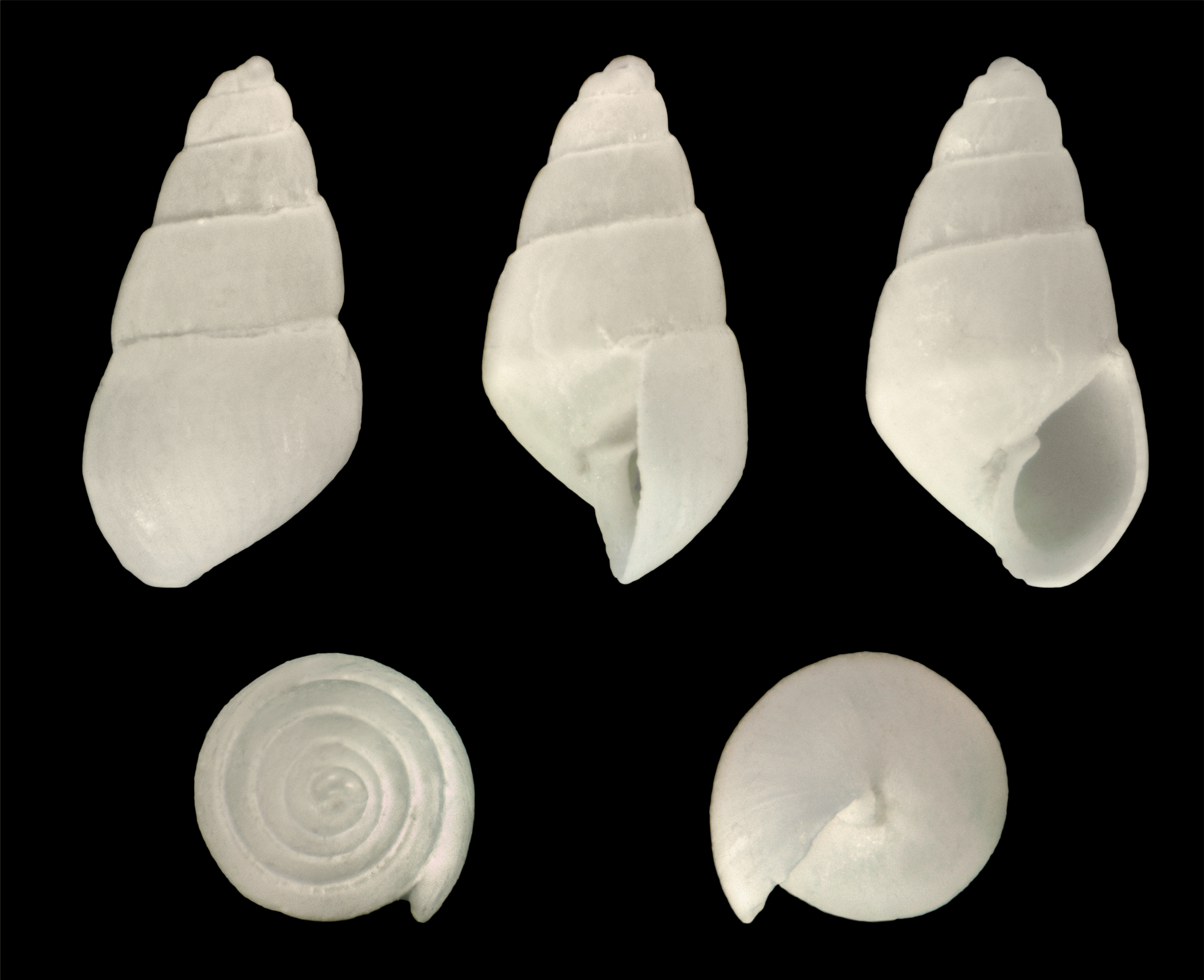

Scientific classification
- Kingdom: Animalia
- Phylum: Mollusca
- Class: Gastropoda
- Family: Pyramidellidae
- Genus: Marginodostomia
- Species: M. suturamarginata

Binomial name
- Marginodostomia suturamarginata Nomura, 1936

Synonyms
- Odostomia suturamarginata (Nomura, S., 1936)

= Marginodostomia suturamarginata =

Species of gastropod

Marginodostomia suturamarginata is a species of sea snail, a marine gastropod mollusk in the family Pyramidellidae, the pyrams and their allies.

== Description ==
The length of the shell attains 2.5 mm.

== Distribution ==
This marine species occurs off the Philippines.
