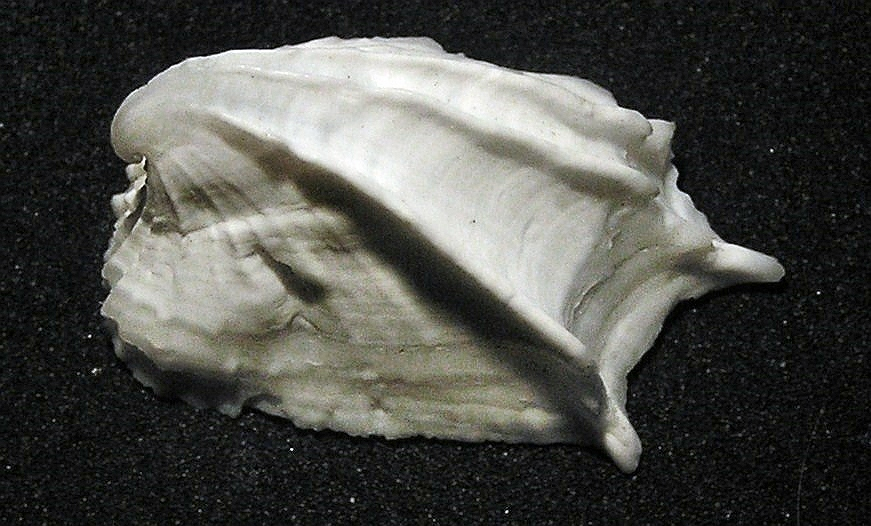
- Lateral view of a shell of Amathina tricarinata

Scientific classification
- Kingdom: Animalia
- Phylum: Mollusca
- Class: Gastropoda
- Subcohort: Panpulmonata
- Superfamily: Pyramidelloidea
- Family: Amathinidae
- Genus: Amathina; Gray, 1842

Type species
- Patella tricarinata Linnaeus, 1767

= Amathina =

Genus of gastropods

Amathina is a genus of small sea snails, marine heterobranch gastropod molluscs or micromolluscs in the family Amathinidae.

Amathina is the type genus of the family Amathinidae.

== Species ==
Species within the genus Amathina include:

- Amathina oyamai Masuda & H. Noda, 1976
- Amathina tricarinata (Linnaeus, 1767)

Species brought into synonymy

- Amathina angustata Souverbie, 1875: synonym of Amathina tricarinata (Linnaeus, 1767)
- Amathina bicarinata Pease, 1861: synonym of Trichamathina bicarinata (Pease, 1861) (superseded combination)
- Amathina imbricata G. B. Sowerby III, 1889: synonym of Hipponicidae incertae sedis imbricata G. B. Sowerby III, 1889 (not Amathina, but rather Hipponicidae)
- Amathina nobilis A. Adams, 1867: synonym of Trichamathina nobilis (A. Adams, 1867)
- Amathina tricostata (Gmelin, 1790): synonym of Amathina tricarinata (Linnaeus, 1767)
- Amathina trigona G. B. Sowerby II, 1870: synonym of Amathina bicarinata Pease, 1861
- Amathina violacea (Angas, 1867): synonym of Capulus violaceus Angas, 1867
- Amathina violaceus (Angas, 1867): synonym of Amathina violacea (Angas, 1867): synonym of Capulus violaceus Angas, 1867 (incorrect gender ending)
