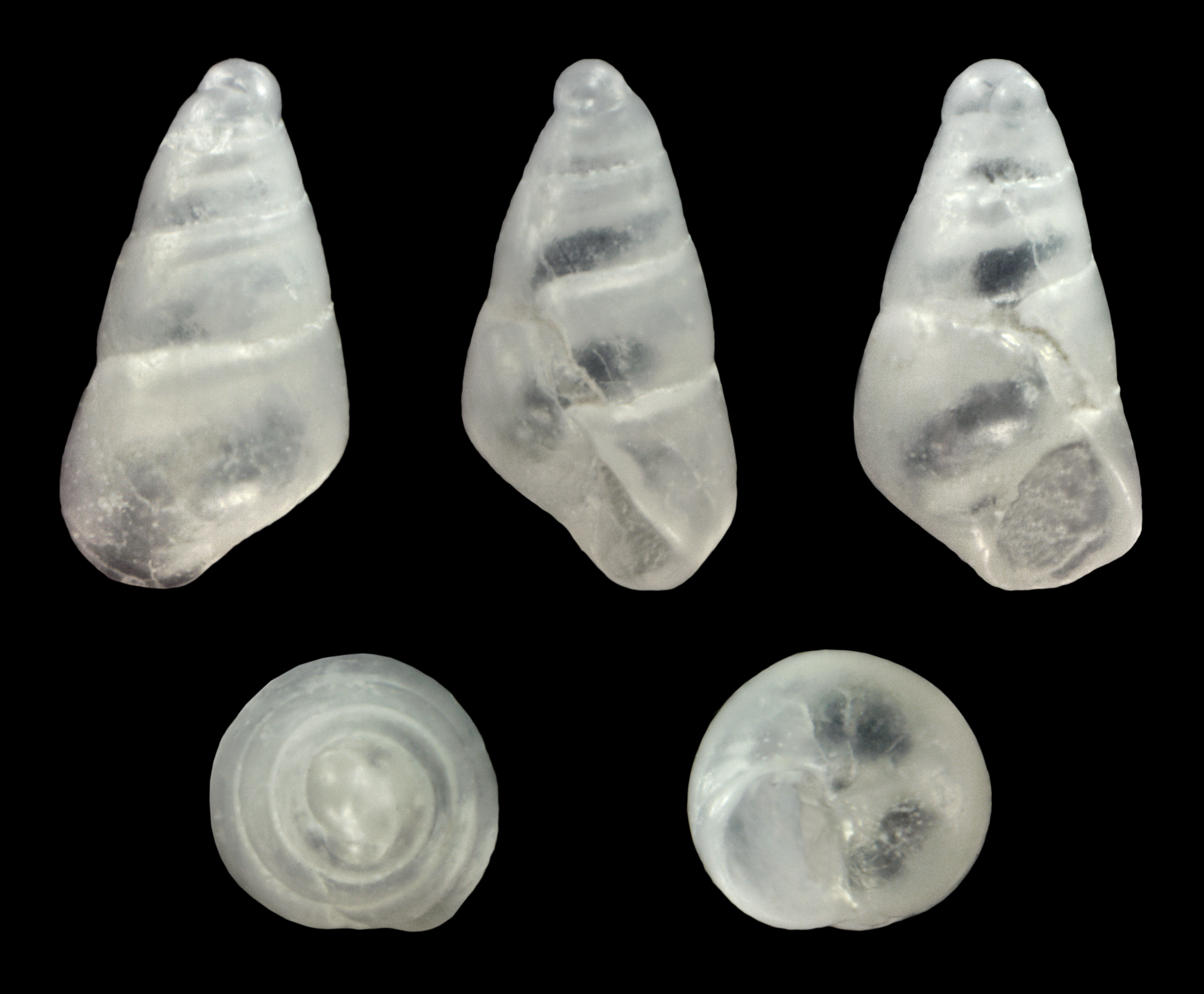

Scientific classification
- Kingdom: Animalia
- Phylum: Mollusca
- Class: Gastropoda
- Family: Pyramidellidae
- Genus: Megastomia
- Species: M. winfriedi

Binomial name
- Megastomia winfriedi Peñas & Rolán, 1999

Synonyms
- Odostomia winfriedi (Peñas & Rolán, 1999)

= Megastomia winfriedi =

Species of gastropod

Megastomia winfriedi is a species of sea snail, a marine gastropod mollusk in the family Pyramidellidae, often called pyrams and their allies.

== Description ==
The shell size varies between 1 mm and 2 mm.

== Distribution ==
This species occurs in the Atlantic Ocean off the Canaries and Madeira.
