= Megastomia canaria =

Scientific classification
- Kingdom: Animalia
- Phylum: Mollusca
- Class: Gastropoda
- Family: Pyramidellidae
- Genus: Megastomia
- Species: M. canaria

Binomial name
- Megastomia canaria (Hedley, 1907)

Synonyms
- Odostomia canaria Hedley, 1907 (basionym); Syrnola (Colsyrnola) canaria (Hedley, 1907); Syrnola canaria (Hedley, 1907) ·

Species of gastropod

Megastomia canaria is a species of sea snail, a marine gastropod mollusk in the family Pyramidellidae, the pyrams and their allies.

== Distribution ==
This marine species occurs off Queensland, Australia.
