= Afroturbonilla multitudinalis =

Scientific classification
- Kingdom: Animalia
- Phylum: Mollusca
- Class: Gastropoda
- Family: Pyramidellidae
- Genus: Afroturbonilla
- Species: A. multitudinalis

Binomial name
- Afroturbonilla multitudinalis Peñas & Rolán, 2002

Species of gastropod

Afroturbonilla multitudinalis is a species of sea snail, a marine gastropod mollusc in the family Pyramidellidae, the pyrams and their allies. This species is one of three other species within the Afroturbonilla genus, with the exception of the others being Afroturbonilla engli and Afroturbonilla hattenbergeriana.

== Distribution ==
This species occurs within the Atlantic Ocean off the west coast of Ghana.
