= Megastomia coseli =

Scientific classification
- Kingdom: Animalia
- Phylum: Mollusca
- Class: Gastropoda
- Family: Pyramidellidae
- Genus: Megastomia
- Species: M. coseli

Binomial name
- Megastomia coseli Penas & Rolan, 1999

Species of gastropod

Megastomia coseli is a species of sea snail, a marine gastropod mollusk in the family Pyramidellidae, the pyrams and their allies.
