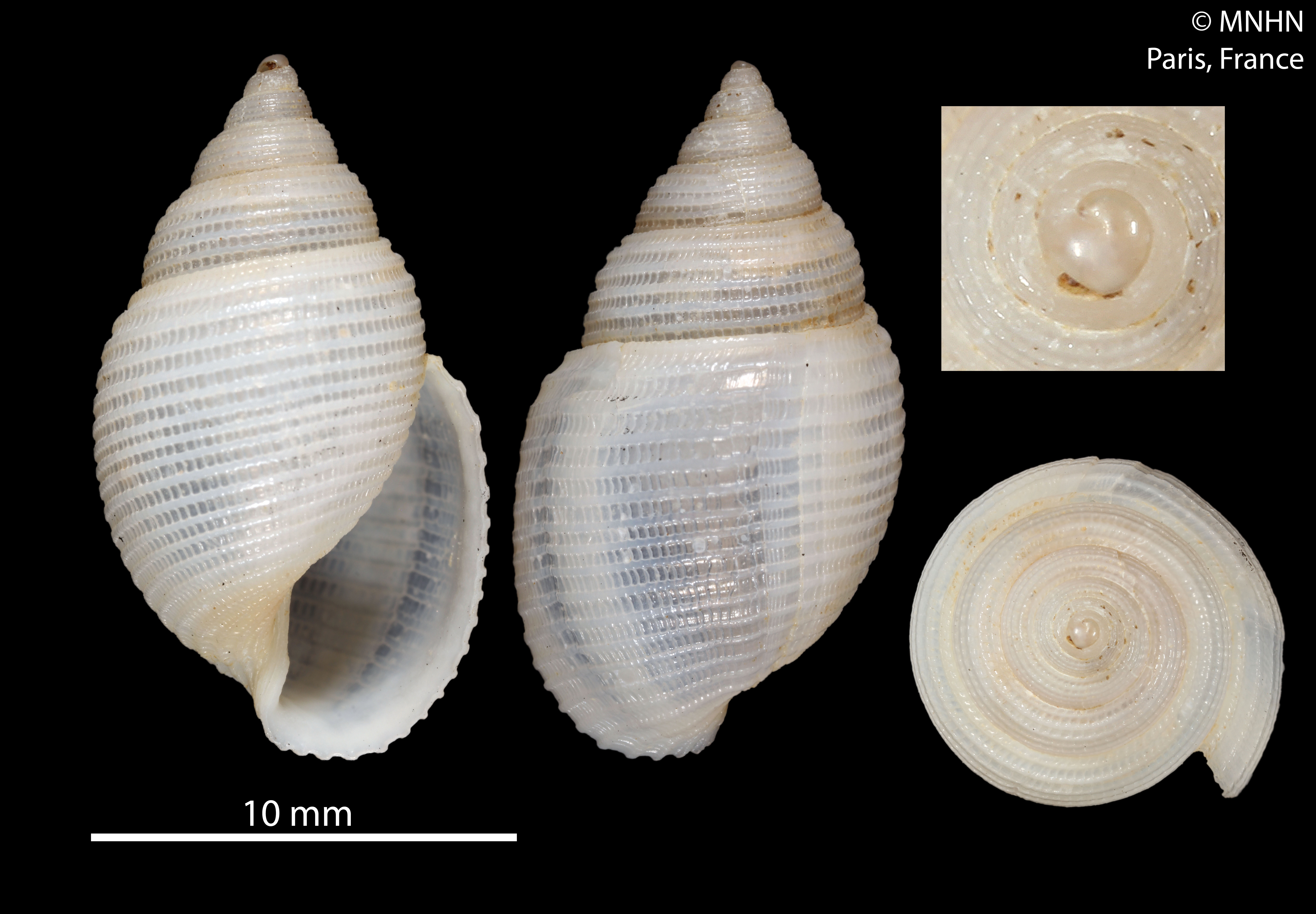
- Shell of Leucotina knopi (paratype at MNHN, Paris)

Scientific classification
- Kingdom: Animalia
- Phylum: Mollusca
- Class: Gastropoda
- Subcohort: Panpulmonata
- Superfamily: Pyramidelloidea
- Family: Amathinidae
- Genus: Leucotina; A. Adams, 1860

Type species
- Leucotina niphonensis A. Adams, 1860

Synonyms
- Actaeon (Leucotina) A. Adams, 1860; Adelactaeon Cossmann, 1895; Leucotina (Adelactaeon) Cossmann, 1895; Myonia A. Adams, 1860 (Invalid: junior homonym of Myonia Dana, 1847 [Bivalvia]; Adelactaeon is a replacement name)

= Leucotina =

Genus of gastropods

Leucotina is a genus of small sea snails, marine heterobranch gastropod molluscs or micromolluscs in the family Amathinidae.

== Species ==
- Leucotina adamsi Kuroda & Habe, 1971
- Leucotina ampulla Saurin, 1962
- Leucotina casta (A. Adams, 1853)
- Leucotina dianae (A. Adams, 1854)
- Leucotina elongata (van Aartsen, Gittenberger & Goud, 1998)
- Leucotina elongata G. B. Sowerby III, 1892
- Leucotina eva Thiele, 1925
- Leucotina exarata A. Adams, 1860
- † Leucotina granulocostata Laws, 1939
- Leucotina gratiosa Melvill, 1898
- Leucotina helva Hedley, 1900
- Leucotina insculpta A. Adams, 1860
- Leucotina japonica (A. Adams, 1860)
- Leucotina jaskensis Melvill, 1897
- Leucotina knopi Poppe & Tagaro, 2010
- Leucotina lilyae (van Aartsen, Gittenberger & Goud, 1998)
- Leucotina micra (Pritchard & Gatliff, 1900)
- Leucotina natalensis E. A. Smith, 1910
- † Leucotina ovalis (Hutton, 1885)
- Leucotina padangensis Thiele, 1925
- † Leucotina praecursoria (Suter, 1917)
- Leucotina punctata A. Adams, 1860
- Leucotina puncturata (E. A. Smith, 1872)
- Leucotina reginae Saurin, 1959
- Leucotina speciosa (A. Adams, 1853)
- Leucotina sulcata A. Adams, 1860

Species brought into synonymy

- Leucotina ambigua (Hutton, 1885): synonym of Leucotina casta (A. Adams, 1853)
- Leucotina amoena (A. Adams, 1853): synonym of Monotygma amoena (A. Adams, 1853)
- Leucotina digitalis (Dall & Bartsch, 1906): synonym of Monotygma amoena (A. Adams, 1853)
- Leucotina esther Angas, 1867: synonym of Leucotina casta (A. Adams, 1853)
- Leucotina formosa W. H. Turton, 1932: synonym of Leucotina elongata G. B. Sowerby III, 1892
- Leucotina niphonensis A. Adams, 1860: synonym of Leucotina dianae (A. Adams, 1854)
- Leucotina sagamiensis Kuroda & Habe, 1971: synonym of Maxacteon sagamiensis (Kuroda & Habe, 1971) (original combination)
- Leucotina sundaica Thiele, 1925: synonym of Leucotina speciosa (A. Adams, 1853)
