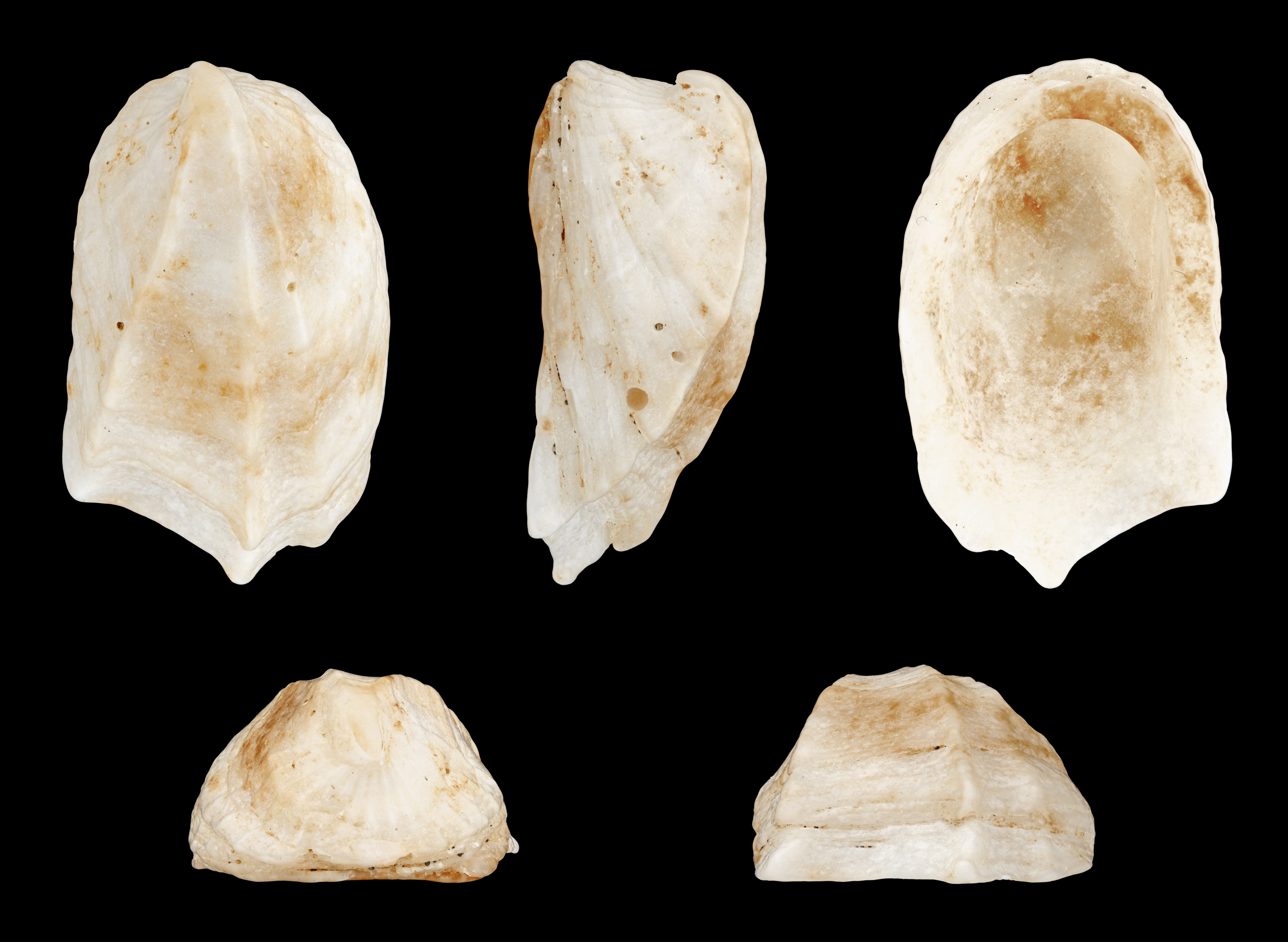
- Five views of a shell of Amathina tricarinata

Scientific classification
- Kingdom: Animalia
- Phylum: Mollusca
- Class: Gastropoda
- Family: Amathinidae
- Genus: Amathina
- Species: A. tricarinata

Binomial name
- Amathina tricarinata (Linnaeus, 1767)

Synonyms
- Amathina angustata Souverbie, 1875; Amathina tricostata (Gmelin, 1791); Hemitoma tricarinata (Linnaeus, 1767); Patella tricarinata Linnaeus, 1767 (original combination)

= Amathina tricarinata =

Species of gastropod

Amathina tricarinata is a species of small sea snail, marine heterobranch gastropod mollusc or micromolluscs in the family Amathinidae.

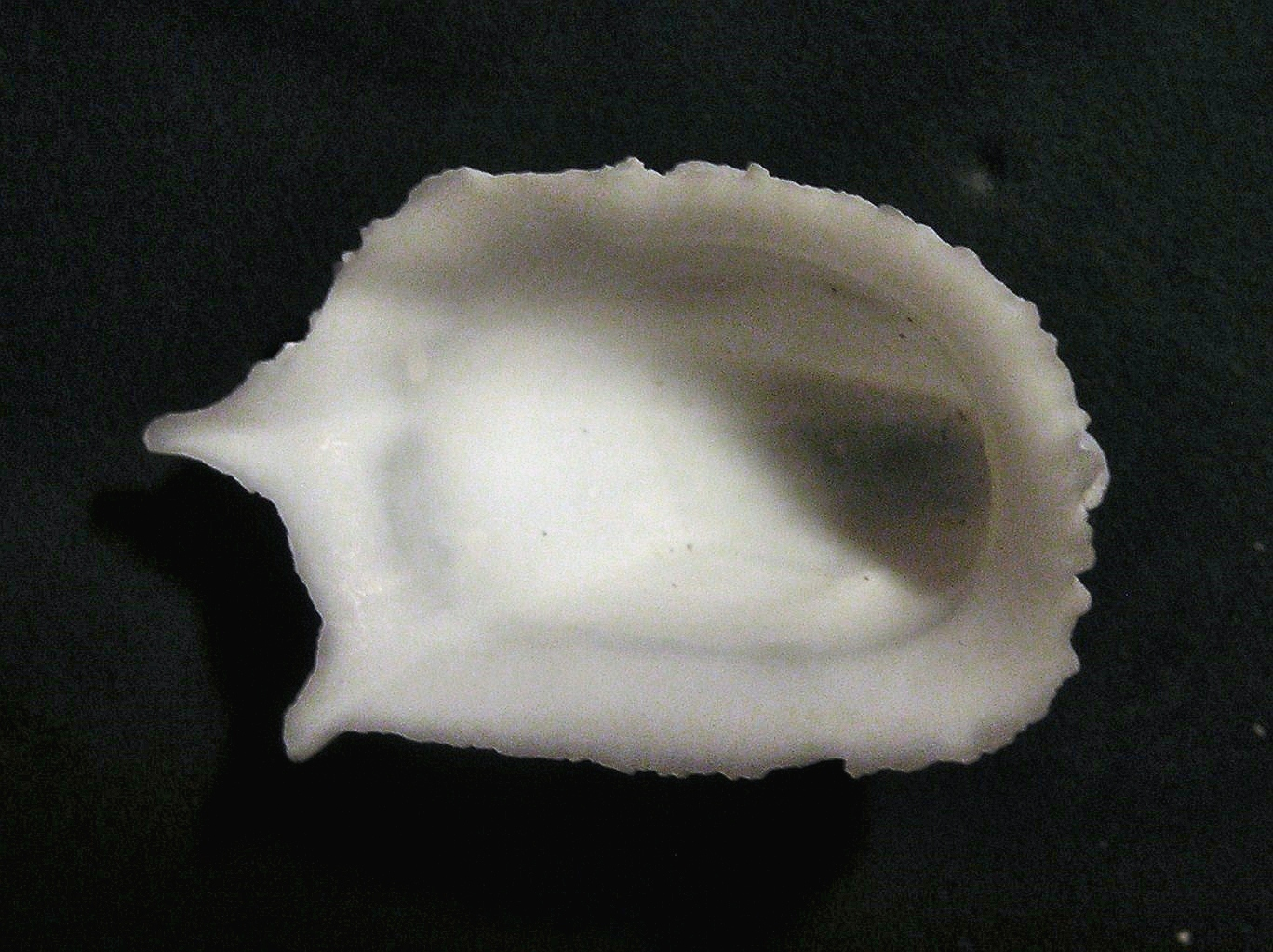
ventral view of the shell of Amathina tricarinata

== Distribution ==
This marine species occurs in the Mediterranean Sea (as a non-indigenous species),; also off Guadeloupe, in the Red Sea and off Madagascar.
