= Megastomia sulcifera =

Scientific classification
- Kingdom: Animalia
- Phylum: Mollusca
- Class: Gastropoda
- Family: Pyramidellidae
- Genus: Megastomia
- Species: M. sulcifera

Binomial name
- Megastomia sulcifera (E.A. Smith, 1871)

Synonyms
- Odostomia sulcifera E.A. Smith, 1871

Species of gastropod

Megastomia sulcifera is a species of sea snail, a marine gastropod mollusk in the family Pyramidellidae, the pyrams and their allies. It was originally identified as Odostomia sulcifera by E.A. Smith in 1872.
