= Brachystomia omaensis =

Scientific classification
- Kingdom: Animalia
- Phylum: Mollusca
- Class: Gastropoda
- Family: Pyramidellidae
- Genus: Brachystomia
- Species: B. omaensis

Binomial name
- Brachystomia omaensis (Nomura, 1938)

Synonyms
- Odostomia omaensis (Nomura, 1938)

Species of gastropod

Brachystomia omaensis is a species of sea snail, a marine gastropod mollusk in the family Pyramidellidae, the pyrams and their allies.

== Description ==
The length of an adult shell varies between 3 mm and 5 mm.

== Distribution ==
This species occurs in the Pacific Ocean off Japan and the Philippines.
