= Megastomia palmaensis =

Scientific classification
- Kingdom: Animalia
- Phylum: Mollusca
- Class: Gastropoda
- Family: Pyramidellidae
- Genus: Megastomia
- Species: M. palmaensis

Binomial name
- Megastomia palmaensis Penas & Rolan, 1999

Species of gastropod

Megastomia palmaensis is a species of sea snail, a marine gastropod mollusk in the family Pyramidellidae, the pyrams and their allies.
