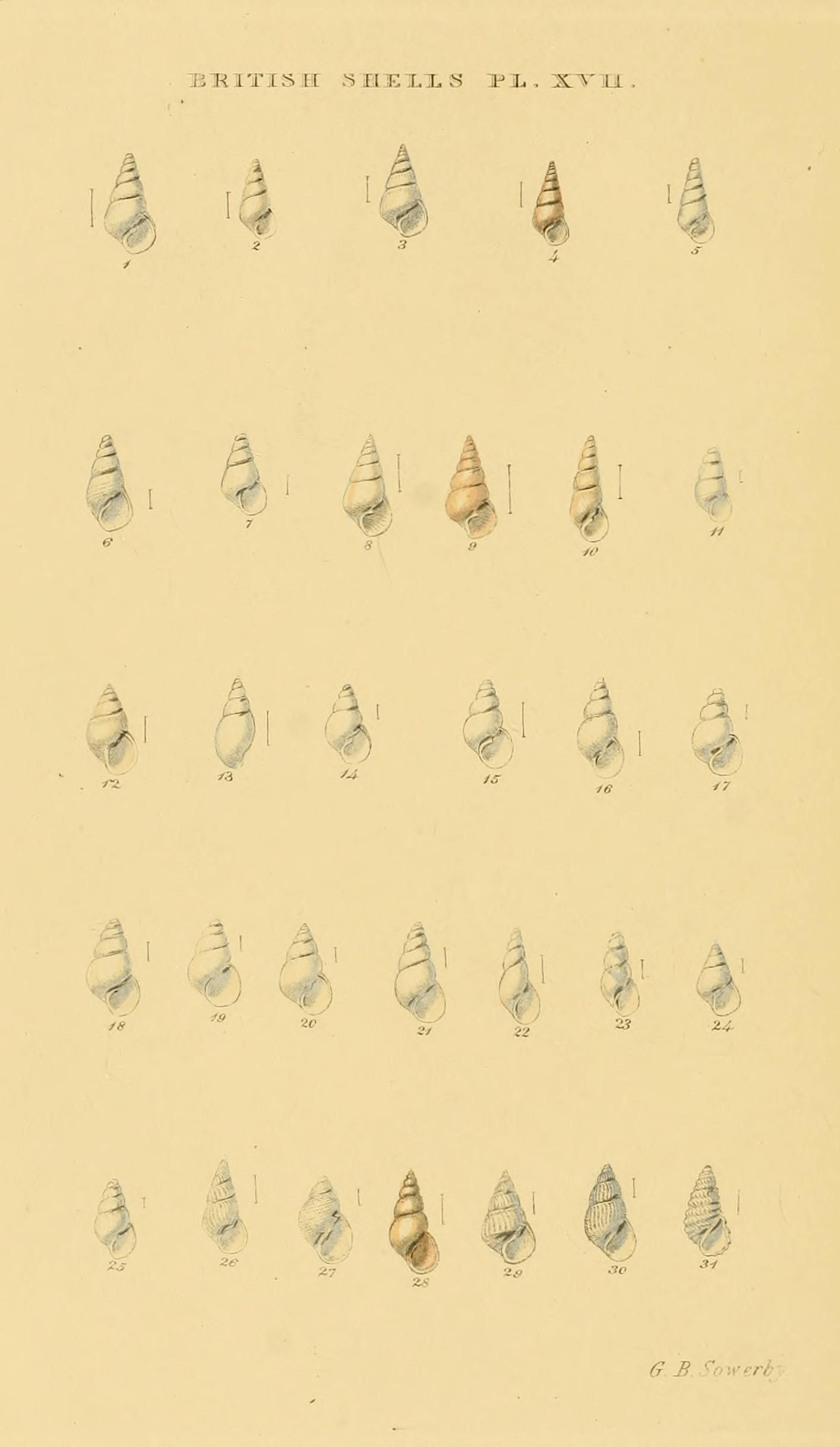
- 18 Odostomia Lukisii Jeffreys Odostomia lukisii

Scientific classification
- Kingdom: Animalia
- Phylum: Mollusca
- Class: Gastropoda
- Family: Pyramidellidae
- Genus: Odostomia
- Species: O. lukisii

Binomial name
- Odostomia lukisii Jeffreys, 1859

Synonyms
- Brachystomia lukisii (Jeffreys, 1859); Odostomia (Brachystomia) lukisii (Jeffreys, 1859)

= Odostomia lukisii =

Species of gastropod

Odostomia lukisii is a species of sea snails, marine gastropod molluscs in the family Pyramidellidae, the pyrams and their allies.

== Description ==
The size of its translucent shell varies between 1.5 mm and 4 mm.

== Distribution ==
This species occurs in the following locations:

- Atlantic Ocean, off the Azores and West Africa.
- European waters (ERMS scope).
- United Kingdom Exclusive Economic Zone.
- Mediterranean Sea, Greek Exclusive Economic Zone and Southwest Coast of Apulia.
