= Megastomia desmiti =

Scientific classification
- Kingdom: Animalia
- Phylum: Mollusca
- Class: Gastropoda
- Family: Pyramidellidae
- Genus: Megastomia
- Species: M. desmiti

Binomial name
- Megastomia desmiti (van Aartsen, Gittenberger E. & Goud, 1998)

Synonyms
- Odostomia desmiti van Aartsen, Gittenberger E. & Goud, 1998

Species of gastropod

Megastomia desmiti is a species of sea snail, a marine gastropod mollusk in the family Pyramidellidae, the pyrams and their allies.

== Distribution ==
This species occurs in the Atlantic Ocean off Mauritania.
