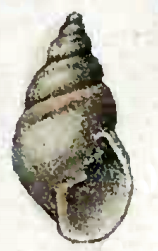
- Drawing of a shell of Odostomia unidentata

Scientific classification
- Kingdom: Animalia
- Phylum: Mollusca
- Class: Gastropoda
- Family: Pyramidellidae
- Genus: Odostomia
- Species: O. unidentata

Binomial name
- Odostomia unidentata (Montagu, 1803)

Synonyms
- Odostomia albella (Loven); Odostomia monterosati Bucq. Dautz. et Dollf.; Odostomia unidentata var. albella (Lovén, 1846)

= Odostomia unidentata =

Species of gastropod

Odostomia unidentata is a species of sea snail, a marine gastropod mollusk in the family Pyramidellidae, the pyrams and their allies.

== Description ==
The almost opaque, glossy, white shell is solid. The length measures 5 mm. The protoconch has a helicoid shape. The teleoconch contains six, flattened whorls with a narrow, distinct suture. The shell has a more or less distinct peripheral angle, visible also at the base of the upper whorls. The sculpture has slight, microscopical, close-set spiral striae and prosocline growth lines. The umbilicus is lacking, although there is sometimes a small chink. The aperture has a straight columellar border. The columellar tooth is long and prominent.

== Distribution ==
This species has a wide distribution and occurs in the following locations:

- European waters (ERMS scope)
- British Isles
- Goote Bank
- Irish Exclusive economic Zone
- Portuguese Exclusive Economic Zone
- Spanish Exclusive Economic Zone
- United Kingdom Exclusive Economic Zone
- Atlantic Ocean : Arctic region to the Azores, Madeira, Canary Islands, North Carolina to the Florida Keys, USA; Northeast Brazil
- Western Mediterranean Sea (Greece)
