= Megastomia aliter =

Scientific classification
- Kingdom: Animalia
- Phylum: Mollusca
- Class: Gastropoda
- Family: Pyramidellidae
- Genus: Megastomia
- Species: M. aliter

Binomial name
- Megastomia aliter Peñas & Rolán, 1999

Species of gastropod

Megastomia aliter is a species of sea snail, a marine gastropod mollusk in the family Pyramidellidae, the pyrams and their allies.

== Description ==
The shell grows to a length of 3 mm.

== Distribution ==
This species occurs in the Atlantic Ocean off Senegal.
