= Phasianema lirata =

Scientific classification
- Kingdom: Animalia
- Phylum: Mollusca
- Class: Gastropoda
- Family: Pyramidellidae
- Genus: Phasianema
- Species: P. lirata

Binomial name
- Phasianema lirata (A. Adams, 1860)

Synonyms
- Fossarus iwateanus Nomura & Hatai, 1935; Isapis lirata A. Adams, 1860; Phasianema phycophyllum A. N. Golikov & Kussakin, 1967

Species of gastropod

Phasianema lirata is a species of sea snail, a marine gastropod mollusc in the family Pyramidellidae, the pyrams and their allies.

== Description ==
(Original description in Latin) The ovoid shell is pale brown, solid, and rimate. It is ornamented with strong transverse lirae separated by simple interspaces. It consists of three whorls, the last of which is large and ovate. The aperture is elongate, tapering anteriorly to a point and slightly reflected. The inner lip is thick and arcuate, bearing a sharp tooth medially, while the outer lip is smooth internally.

== Distribution ==
This species occurs in the Sea of Japan.
