= Megastomia ruris =

Scientific classification
- Kingdom: Animalia
- Phylum: Mollusca
- Class: Gastropoda
- Family: Pyramidellidae
- Genus: Megastomia
- Species: M. ruris

Binomial name
- Megastomia ruris Penas & Rolan, 1999

Species of gastropod

Megastomia ruris is a species of sea snail, a marine gastropod mollusk in the family Pyramidellidae, the pyrams and their allies.
