= Carinorbis =

Scientific classification
- Kingdom: Animalia
- Phylum: Mollusca
- Class: Gastropoda
- Family: Amathinidae
- Genus: Carinorbis; Conrad, 1862

Synonyms
- Clathrella Récluz, 1864

Genus of sea snails

Carinorbis is a genus of gastropods belonging to the family Amathinidae.

The species of this genus are found in Europe and Northern America.

Species:

- Carinorbis burdigala (d'Orbigny, 1852)
- Carinorbis clathrata (Philippi, 1844)
- Carinorbis lyra (Conrad, 1834)
- Carinorbis naticoides (Dall, 1889)
- Carinorbis quadricostata (Emmons, 1858)
- Carinorbis sulcosa (Brocchi, 1814)
- Carinorbis volumen (Peñas & Rolán, 2001)
