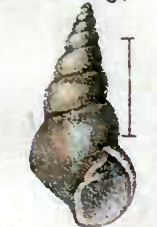
- Drawing of Megastomia conspicua

Scientific classification
- Kingdom: Animalia
- Phylum: Mollusca
- Class: Gastropoda
- Family: Pyramidellidae
- Genus: Megastomia
- Species: M. conspicua

Binomial name
- Megastomia conspicua Alder, 1850

Synonyms
- Megastomia conspicua (Alder, 1850); Odostomia (Megastomia) conspicua conspicua Alder, J., 1850

= Megastomia conspicua =

Species of gastropod

Megastomia conspicua is a species of sea snail, a marine gastropod mollusc in the family Pyramidellidae, the pyrams and their allies.

== Description ==
The shell grows to a length of 8.7 mm. The solid shell is opaque and glossy, with microscopic spiral and longitudinal striae. The shell has a pale cream color, varying to chocolate, and more or less stained with madder. There are eight whorls (besides 2 embryonic). The periphery is obtusely angulated, the angle showing at the base of the spire whorls. The umbilicus is extremely small, almost covered. The columellar tooth is strong and conspicuous. The outer lip is grooved within.

== Distribution ==
This species occurs in the following locations:

- European waters (ERMS scope)
- Mediterranean Sea: Greek Exclusive Economic Zone
- Irish Exclusive economic Zone
- Portuguese Exclusive Economic Zone
- Spanish Exclusive Economic Zone
- United Kingdom Exclusive Economic Zone
