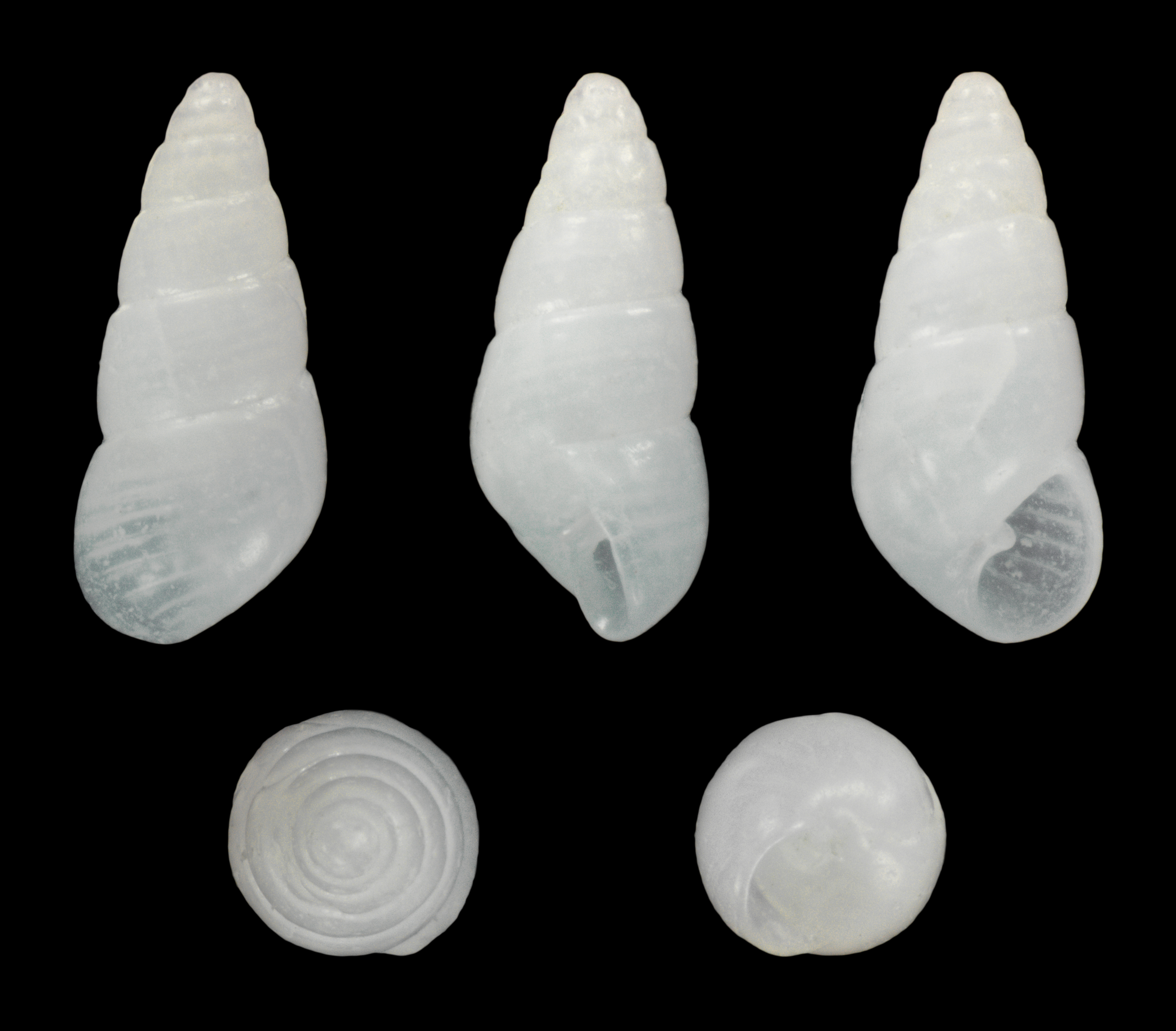

Scientific classification
- Kingdom: Animalia
- Phylum: Mollusca
- Class: Gastropoda
- Family: Pyramidellidae
- Genus: Megastomia
- Species: M. tenera

Binomial name
- Megastomia tenera A. Adams, 1860

= Megastomia tenera =

Species of gastropod

Megastomia tenera is a species of sea snail, a marine gastropod mollusc in the family Pyramidellidae, the pyrams and their allies.
