= Phasianema =

Scientific classification
- Kingdom: Animalia
- Phylum: Mollusca
- Class: Gastropoda
- Family: Pyramidellidae
- Genus: Phasianema; S.V. Wood, 1842

Genus of gastropods

Phasianema is a genus of sea snails, marine gastropod mollusks in the family Pyramidellidae, the pyrams and their allies.

== Species ==
Species within the genus Phasianema include:

- Phasianema costatum Brocchi
- Phasianema lirata A. Adams, 1860
