= Odostomia improbabilis =

Scientific classification
- Kingdom: Animalia
- Phylum: Mollusca
- Class: Gastropoda
- Family: Pyramidellidae
- Genus: Odostomia
- Species: O. improbabilis

Binomial name
- Odostomia improbabilis Oberling, 1970

Synonyms
- Odostomia verduini van Aartsen, 1987

Species of gastropod

Odostomia improbabilis is a species of sea snail, a marine gastropod mollusc in the family Pyramidellidae, the pyrams and their allies.

== Description ==
The shell grows to a length of 2.5 mm.

== Distribution ==
This species occurs in the following locations:

- Canary Islands
- Cape Verde
- Congo
- European waters (ERMS scope)
- Greek Exclusive Economic Zone
- Mauritania
- Mediterranean Sea
- Portuguese Exclusive Economic Zone
- Spanish Exclusive Economic Zone
