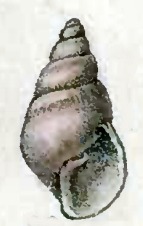
- Drawing of Brachystomia eulimoides

Scientific classification
- Kingdom: Animalia
- Phylum: Mollusca
- Class: Gastropoda
- Family: Pyramidellidae
- Genus: Brachystomia
- Species: B. eulimoides

Binomial name
- Brachystomia eulimoides (Hanley, 1844)

Synonyms
- Brachystomia electa (Jeffreys, 1883) (dubious synonym); Odostomia (Brachystomia) eulimoides Hanley, 1844; Odostomia (Megastomia) conoidea conoidea (Brocchi, G.B., 1814); Odostomia crassa Thompson W., 1845; Odostomia dubia Jeffreys, 1848; Odostomia electa Jeffreys, 1883 (dubious synonym); Odostomia eulimoides Hanley, 1844 · accepted, alternate representation; Odostomia notata Jeffreys, 1848; Odostomia novegradensis Brusina, 1865; Odostomia pallida (Montagu, 1803) sensu Jeffreys, 1867 (based on a nomen dubium); Turbonilla oscitans Lovén, 1846

= Brachystomia eulimoides =

Species of gastropod

Brachystomia eulimoides is a species of sea snail, a marine gastropod mollusc in the family Pyramidellidae, the pyrams and their allies.

== Description ==
The milk-white or yellowish white shell is rather solid, nearly opaque, somewhat glossy. Its length measures 5 mm. It is marked by microscopic spiral striae. The six to seven whorls of the teleoconch are somewhat convex, and rapidly enlarging. The suture is moderate and distinct. The umbilical chink is very narrow or is lacking. The columellar tooth is strong.

== Distribution ==
This species occurs in the following locations:

- Azores Exclusive Economic Zone
- British Isles
- Dorset
- European waters (ERMS scope)
- Goote Bank
- Greek Exclusive Economic Zone
- Irish Exclusive economic Zone
- Portuguese Exclusive Economic Zone
- Spanish Exclusive Economic Zone
- United Kingdom Exclusive Economic Zone

== Notes ==
Additional information regarding this species:

- Habitat: Known from the nearshore.
