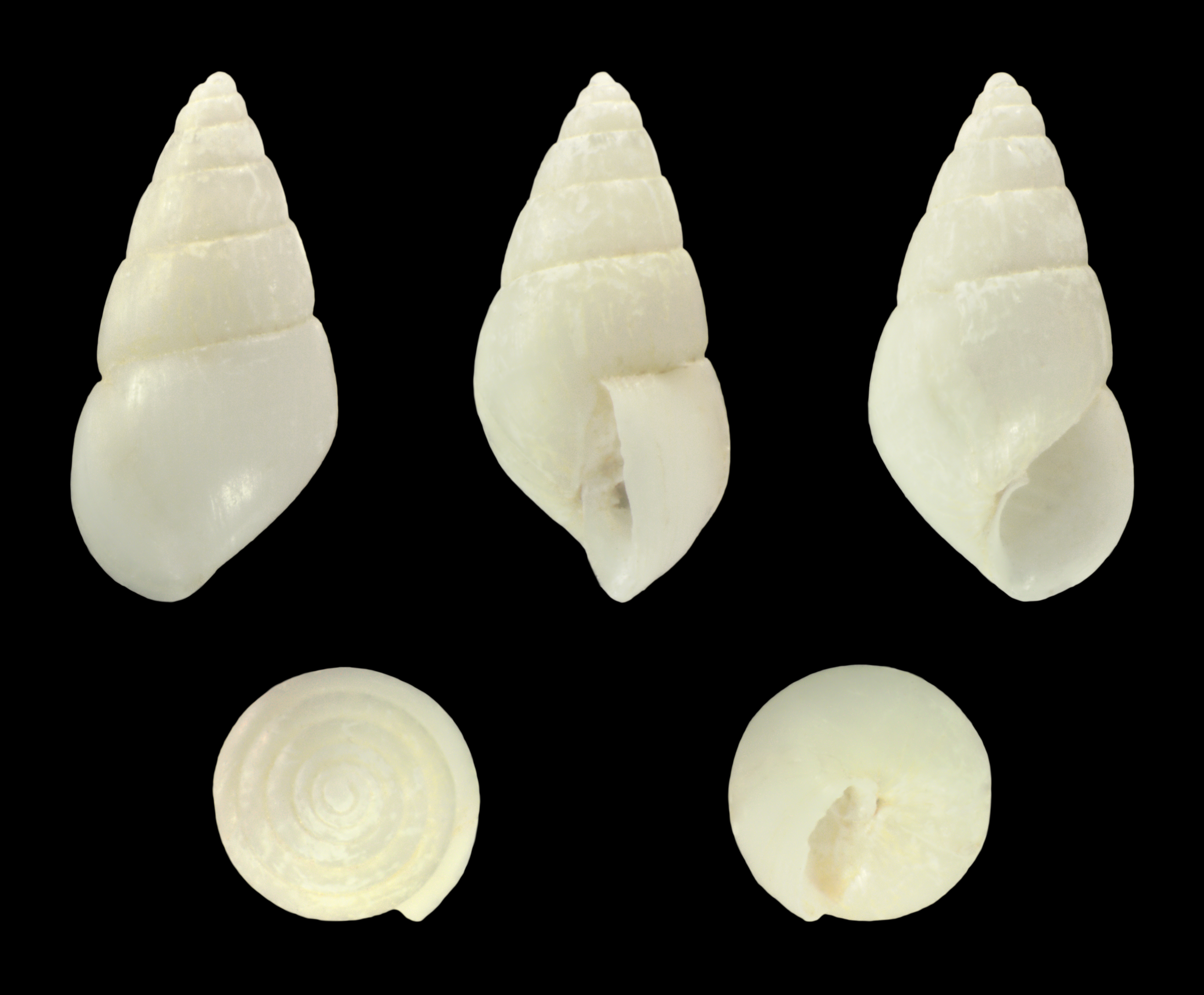
- Megastomia conoidea

Scientific classification
- Kingdom: Animalia
- Phylum: Mollusca
- Class: Gastropoda
- Family: Pyramidellidae
- Genus: Megastomia
- Species: M. conoidea

Binomial name
- Megastomia conoidea (Brocchi, 1814)

Synonyms
- Eulima monodon Requien, 1848; Odostomia conoidea (Brocchi, 1814); Odostomia var. australis Jeffreys, J.G., 1867; Odostomia eulimoides Jeffreys, J.G., 1847; Odostomia nagli Brusina, S., 1865; Odostomia plica Cantraine, F.J., 1842; Odostomia sicula Philippi, R.A., 1851; Odostomia sulcifera Smith, E.A., 1872; Odostomia tenuis Jeffreys, 1884; Odostomia (Megastomia) boteroi Schander, C., 1994; Odostomia (Megastomia) corimbensis Schander, C., 1994; Odostomia (Megastomia) gilsoni Dautzenberg, Ph., 1912; Odostomia (Megastomia) polita Bivona-Bernardi, A., 1832; Odostomia (Odostomia) plicata Fleming, C.A.; Ovatella polita Bivona Ant., 1832 (dubious synonym); Rissoa polita Scacchi, 1836; Turbo conoideus Brocchi, 1814

= Megastomia conoidea =

Species of gastropod

Megastomia conoidea is a species of sea snail, a marine gastropod mollusk in the family Pyramidellidae, the pyrams and their allies.

== Description ==
The shell size varies between 2.5 mm and 7 mm. The white shell is solid, polished and with microscopic growth lines. The periphery is more or less distinctly keeled or angulated, with an impressed spiral line. There are eight, nearly flat whorls. The umbilicus is small and deep. The columellar tooth is strong and prominent. The interior of the outer lip is ridged, terminating in small tubercles within the mouth.

(Description of Odostomia sicula) The white shell is solid and polished. Its length measures 6.25 mm. The eight whorls of the teleoconch are nearly flat. They are marked with microscopic growth lines. The periphery of the shell is more or less distinctly keeled or angulated. The shell shows an impressed spiral line. The small umbilicus goes deep. The columellar tooth is strong and prominent. The interior of the lip is ridged, terminating in small tubercles within the aperture.

G.W. Tryon (1889) considered it a synonym of Odostomia conoidea Brocchi.

== Distribution ==
This species occurs in the following locations:

- Angola
- Canary Islands
- Cape Verde Archipelago
- the Atlantic Ocean (Norway to West Africa, Senegal, Angola)
- São Tomé and Príncipe Archipelagos
- United Kingdom Exclusive Economic Zone
- Mediterranean Sea
