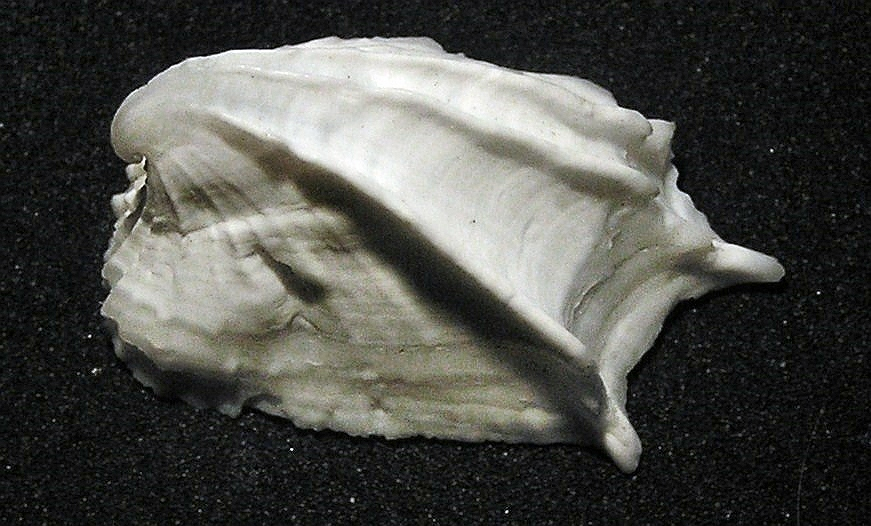
- Lateral view of a shell of Amathina tricarinata

Scientific classification
- Kingdom: Animalia
- Phylum: Mollusca
- Class: Gastropoda
- Subterclass: Tectipleura
- Subcohort: Panpulmonata
- Superfamily: Pyramidelloidea
- Family: Amathinidae; Ponder, 1987

Type genus
- Amathina Gray, 1842

= Amathinidae =

Family of gastropods

Amathinidae, is a taxonomic family mostly consisting of small and minute sea snails, marine heterobranch gastropod molluscs or micromolluscs in the superfamily Pyramidelloidea.

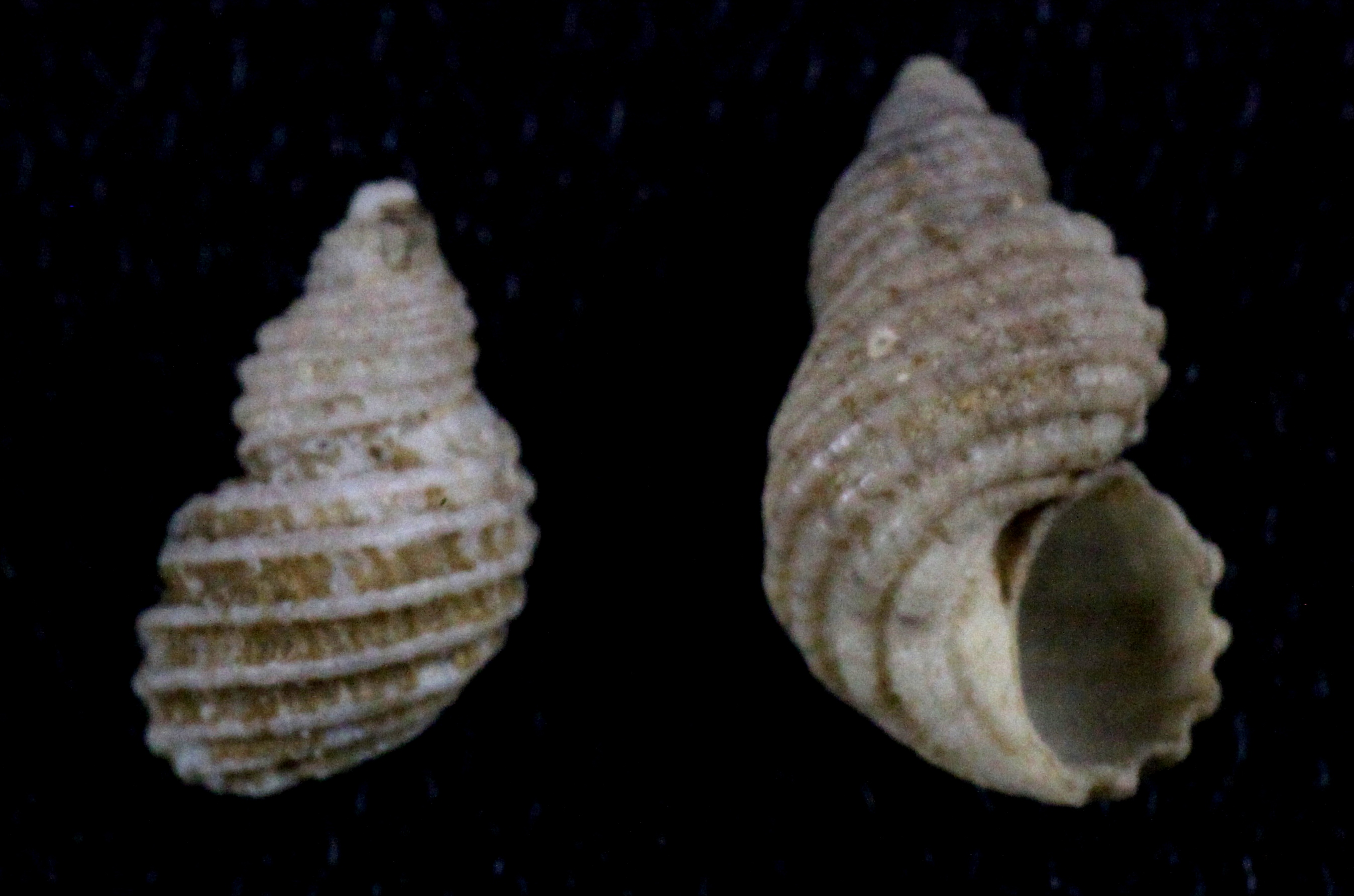
Two shells of Iselica ovoidea

Together with Pyramidellidae, Ebalidae, Turbonillidae, Odostomidae and other genera they form the superfamily Pyramidelloidea.

Little is known on the biology of the group, but some data on the anatomy and systematic position is given by Ponder (1987) and Huber (1993).

== 1999 taxonomy ==
Genera within the family Amathinidae according to the taxonomy of Schander, Van Aartsen & Corgan (1999) include:

- Genus Amathina J. E. Gray, 1842
- Genus Amathinoides Sacco, 1896
- Genus Carinorbis Conrad, 1862
- Genus Cyclothyca Stearns, 1861
- Genus Faluniella Cossman, 1921
- Genus Iselica Dall, 1918
- Genus Leucotina A. Adams, 1860
- Genus Phasianema Wood, 1842
- Genus Plicifer H. Adams, 1868

== 2005 taxonomy ==
This family has no subfamilies.

== Genera ==
This family presently comprises less than 100 recent and fossil species divided into seven genera: Amathina, Amathinoides, Carinorbis, Cyclothyca, Iselica, Leucotina and Phasianema.

Two additional genera, Faluniella and Plicifer may also be a part of Amathinidae:

- Faluniella Cossmann, 1921

Genera within the family Amathinidae include:

- Amathina Gray, 1842
- Cyclothyca Stearns, 1891
- Iselica Dall, 1918
- Leucotina A. Adams, 1860
- Monotygma G. B. Sowerby II, 1839
- Plicifer H. Adams, 1868
- † Raulinia Mayer, 1864

Genera brought into synonymy

- Adelactaeon Cossmann, 1895: synonym of Leucotina A. Adams, 1860
- Amathinoides Sacco, 1896 † accepted as Clathrella Récluz, 1864 accepted as Carinorbis Conrad, 1862
- Clathrella Récluz, 1864 accepted as Carinorbis Conrad, 1862
- Isapis H. Adams & A. Adams, 1854 accepted as Iselica Dall, 1918 (Invalid: junior homonym of Isapis Doubleday, 1847 [Lepidoptera]; Iselica is a replacement name)
- Myonia A. Adams, 1860: synonym of Leucotina A. Adams, 1860

== Anatomy ==
The shells are usually flat without coiling. They usually have strong axial ribs. Ponder described giant neurons in the cerebral ganglion.
