= Odostomia =

- Brachystomia eulimoides, Melanella conoidea, Odostomia conspicua, Jordaniella truncatula

Scientific classification
- Kingdom: Animalia
- Phylum: Mollusca
- Class: Gastropoda
- Family: Pyramidellidae
- Genus: Odostomia; J. Fleming, 1813

Type species
- Turbo plicatus Montagu, G., 1803

Species
- See text

Synonyms
- Brachystomia Monterosato, 1884; Eulimella (Evalina) Dall & Bartsch, 1904; Odontostoma Philippi, 1853 (Invalid: unjustified emendation of Odostomia); Odontostomia G.B. Sowerby I, 1839 (Invalid: unjustified emendation of Odostomia); Odostomia (Brachystomia) Monterosato, 1884; † Odostomia (Cyclodostomia) Sacco, 1892; Odostomia (Odostomia) Fleming, 1813; Odostomia (Pyramistomia) Cossmann, 1921; Ptychostomon Locard, 1886

Genus of gastropods

Odostomia is the most speciose genus of minute sea snails, pyramidellid gastropod mollusks. This genus is placed in the family Pyramidellidae in the subfamily Odostomiinae. There are several hundred species in this diverse genus (Schander et al. 1999)

Most of the description of species in the genus Odostomia was carried out by Dall & Bartsch in 1909. Many of the described species are however suspected of being synonyms, or are proven synonyms.

The genus Odostomia Fleming, 1813 was used by 19th century authors, particularly in the European literature, for most of the smaller Pyramidellidae. It is still a catchall for most small pyramidellids lacking both axial and spiral sculpture. Some authors, e.g. Høisæter (2014), Peñas, Rolán & Swinnen (2014) and Giannuzzi-Savelli et al. (2014) who are here followed have attempted to redistribute some of the species, but there are still many species remaining unduly under Odostomia. For these, the database WoRMS has refrained from making new combinations not backed by (or implicit from) a published source but, unless otherwise noted, the species that were already "accepted" under a subgenus now raised to full genus have been marked as "accepted" under that full genus.

The European and American species of Odostomia differ in several anatomical and shell characteristics. They are therefore likely to be assigned to different genera.

== Distribution ==
The genus Odostomia is common in all oceans from the tropics to the polar regions. It is mainly known from coastal areas and sandy shores, and is less common in the deep sea.

== Description ==
There is little known about their life histories. Most species are only known from their shells.

Most species have a white of yellowish, minute, conical to ovate-conical shell, usually between 2 mm and 5 mm. The apex is rather obtuse or nipple-shaped, sinistrally or dextrally oriented to the teleoconch. The protoconch is usually deeply immersed in the first of the succeeding turns. The shells are variously sculptured, usually with a microsculpture. The teleoconch contains in most cases between 4 and 6 whorls. The body whorl is usually large, comprising 50-60% of the total length. The aperture is suboval to ovate with the peristome incomplete behind. There is usually a tooth-like fold on the columella. The shells usually have a small umbilicus or none at all.

== Life habits ==
The members of Odostomia are ectoparasites on other molluscs, and polychaetes. First they pierce the body wall with the buccal stylet and then feed on them by sucking blood with their buccal pump. They have become a pest of oysters, mussels, scallops and slipper limpets. Most of the Odostomia species are host-specific, only a few are not. Odostomia scalaris MacGillivray, 1843 is an ectoparasite on a wide range of hosts but especially known as a pest of mussels. Odostomia turrita Hanley, 1844 has been found on the European lobster Homarus gammarus (Linnaeus, 1758).
