= Christoffer Schander =

Norwegian marine biologist

Carl Fredrik Christoffer Schander (21 May 1960 – 21 February 2012) was a professor in marine biology at the University of Bergen, Norway. He was also a thematic leader at the Centre of Excellence in Geobiology. His doctoral thesis (1997, University of Gothenburg, Sweden) explored the evolutionary relationships of the parasitic marine gastropod family Pyramidellidae. He worked on marine invertebrates, mainly molluscs, and published more than 90 scientific papers in peer-reviewed journals, 76 are indexed in the Web of Knowledge, and fourteen of them have been cited ten or more times.

According to his web page, he considered the goal of his research to be understanding the roles that evolutionary forces and phylogeny have played in creating organismal diversity. To help develop this understanding, he used phylogenetic analyses that integrated morphological, ultrastructural and molecular data. His research focused on molluscs and more specifically on the ectoparasitic pyramidellid gastropods and the, shell-less, primary deep-sea aplacophorans, the biogeography of these animals, and the relationship between the molluscs and other animal groups.

In addition to taxonomy and systematics, he published several papers on the use of formalin fixed tissue for molecular studies. He was active in the DNA barcoding community.

The World Register of Marine Species mentions 33 new gastropod species named by Schander

== Personal life ==
Schander was born in Sweden in 1960. He lived in his home town of Borås and became one of the most active Swedish science fiction fans in the 1980s, creating fanzines such as Semikolon A & B and I väntan på PEP and the APA Efterapa, and arranging science fiction conventions such as RegnCon in 1981. He died after a short illness on 21 February 2012.

== Partial bibliography ==
- Schander, C (1993). "Bathyarca grenophia (Mollusca, Bivalvia) utilises Astrorhitza arenaria and Rhabdammina abyssorum (Foraminifera) as hard substrate on ooze bottoms". Fauna Norvegica. 14 (3): 61–62. doi:10.5324/fn.v14i0.6041.
- Warén, A.; Gofas, S.; Schander, C. (1993). "Systematic position of three European heterobranch Gastropods". Veliger. 36 (1): 1–15.
- Nofroni, I.; Schander, C. (1994). "Description of three new species of Pyramidellidae (Gastropoda, Heterobranchia) from West Africa". Notiziario CISMA. 15 (1): 1–10.
- Schander, C (1994). "Twenty-eight new species of Pyramidellidae (Gastropoda, Heterobranchia) from West Africa". Notiziario CISMA. 15 (1): 11–76.
- Schander, C (1995). "Pyramidellidae (Mollusca, Gastropoda, Heterobranchia) of the Faroe Islands". Sarsia. 80: 55–65. doi:10.1080/00364827.1995.10413580.
- Schander, C.; Thollesson, M. (1995). "Phylogenetic taxonomy-some comments". Zoologica Scripta. 24 (3): 263–268. doi:10.1111/j.1463-6409.1995.tb00404.x. S2CID 84974611.
- Lundberg, J.; Schander, C.; Stokland, Ø. (1996). "A preliminary cladistic analysis of North Atlantic Oenopota Moerch, 1852 and Propebela Iredale, 1918 (Gastropoda, Conoidea)". Journal of Molluscan Studies. 62 (3): 289–298. doi:10.1093/mollus/62.3.289.
- Schander, C (1997). "Turbonilla angelinagagiliniae, new name for Turbonilla scrobiculata Schander, 1994 (Gastropoda, Heterobranchia, Pyramidellidae)". Bolletino Malacologico. 13: 45–46.
- Schander, C.; et al. (1998). "Types, emendations and names - a reply to Lidén et al". Taxon. 47 (2): 401–406. Bibcode:1998Taxon..47..401S. doi:10.2307/1223769. JSTOR 1223769.
- Scheltema, A. H.; Schander, C. (2000). "Discrimination and phylogeny of solenogaster species through the morphology of hard parts (Mollusca, Aplacophora, Neomeniomorpha)". The Biological Bulletin. 198 (1): 121–151. doi:10.2307/1542810. JSTOR 1542810. PMID 10707820.
- Dahlgren, T. G.; Akesson, B.; Schander, C.; Halanych, K. M.; Sundberg, P. (2001). "Molecular phylogeny of the model annelid Ophryotrocha" (PDF). The Biological Bulletin. 201 (2): 193–203. doi:10.2307/1543334. JSTOR 1543334. PMID 11687391. S2CID 24340804. Archived from the original (PDF) on 2011-07-19.
- Schander, C.; Sundberg, P. (2001). "Useful characters in gastropod phylogeny: Soft information or hard facts?". Systematic Biology. 50 (1): 136–141. doi:10.1080/10635150118712. PMID 12116590.
- Schander, C. (2003). "DNA, PCR and formalinized animal tissue ? A short review and protocols" (PDF). Organisms Diversity & Evolution. 3 (3): 195–201. Bibcode:2003ODivE...3..195S. doi:10.1078/1439-6092-00071.
- Dayrat B.; Schander C.; Angielczyk K. D. (2004). "Suggestions for a new species nomenclature". Taxon. 53 (2): 485–491. Bibcode:2004Taxon..53..485D. doi:10.2307/4135627. JSTOR 4135627.
- Passamaneck, Y.; Schander, C.; Halanych, K. (2004). "Investigation of molluscan phylogeny using large-subunit and small-subunit nuclear rRNA sequences". Molecular Phylogenetics & Evolution. 32 (1): 25–38. Bibcode:2004MolPE..32...25P. doi:10.1016/j.ympev.2003.12.016. PMID 15186794.
- Schander, C.; Willassen, E. (2005). "What can biological barcoding do for marine biology?". Marine Biology Research. 1 (1): 79–83. Bibcode:2005MBioR...1...79S. doi:10.1080/17451000510018962. PDF.
- Caron, J.-B.; Scheltema, A.; Schander, C.; Rudkin, D. (2006). "A soft-bodied mollusc with radula from the Middle Cambrian Burgess Shale" (PDF). Nature. 442 (7099): 159–163. Bibcode:2006Natur.442..159C. doi:10.1038/nature04894. hdl:1912/1404. PMID 16838013. S2CID 4431853.
- Pleijel, F.; Jondelius, U.; Norlinder, E.; Nygren, A.; Oxelman, B.; Schander, C.; Sundberg, P.; Thollesson, M. (2008). "Phylogenies without roots? A plea for the use of vouchers in molecular phylogenetic studies". Molecular Phylogenetics and Evolution. 48 (1): 369–371. Bibcode:2008MolPE..48..369P. doi:10.1016/j.ympev.2008.03.024. PMID 18424089.
- Cárdenas, P.; Xavier, J. R.; Reveillaud, J.; Schander, C.; Rapp, H. T. (2011). "Molecular Phylogeny of the Astrophorida (Porifera, Demospongiaep) Reveals an Unexpected High Level of Spicule Homoplasy". PLOS ONE. 6 (4) e18318. Bibcode:2011PLoSO...618318C. doi:10.1371/journal.pone.0018318. PMC 3072971. PMID 21494664.
