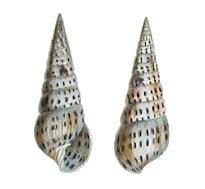
- Two views of a shell of Pyramidella acus

Scientific classification
- Kingdom: Animalia
- Phylum: Mollusca
- Class: Gastropoda
- Superfamily: Pyramidelloidea
- Family: Pyramidellidae
- Subfamily: Pyramidellinae
- Genus: Pyramidella; Lamarck, 1799

Type species
- Trochus dolabratus Linnaeus, C., 1758

Synonyms
- Melania (Plotia) Röding, 1798 · unaccepted (new combination); Obeliscus Anonymus, 1797 = Obeliscus Gray, 1847; Plotia Röding, 1798 (Invalid: placed on the Official Index of Rejected and Invalid Names by ICZN Opinion 386.); Pyramidella (Elusa) A. Adams, 1861 · (Invalid: junior homonym of Elusa...); Pyramidella (Sulcorinella) Dall & Bartsch, 1904; Urambella Laseron, 1959

= Pyramidella =

Genus of molluscs

Pyramidella is a genus of minute to medium-sized sea snails, marine gastropod molluscs in the subfamily Pyramidellinae of the family Pyramidellidae, the pyrams and their allies.

Pyramidella is the type genus of the family Pyramidellidae.

== Nomenclature ==
The generic name Pyramidella Lamarck, 1799, has been validated under the Plenary Powers of the ICZN, Opinion 386 (1955). The name Obeliscus Anonymus, 1797 [= Obeliscus Gray, 1847] has also been used for this genus, whereas the name Pyramidella was used for the genus now known as Otopleura Fischer, 1885.

== General description ==
The shell has an elongate-conic shape, slightly striated. The many whorls of the teleoconch are usually inflated and regularly increasing. They are longitudinally ribbed or smooth. The semioval aperture is entire, widened at its base and rounded in front. .The columella has one to three folds. The sharp outer lip is entire, inferiorly sub-perforated and often plicate within with three transverse folds. The shell is usually larger than in Turbonilla. The thin operculum is horny, ovate, elongated, with very fine elements and oblique folds and folds oblique. The shell lacks an epidermis.

The shells are generally quite small, of an elegant form, elongated, marked with more or less deep spots. The general color of the body of these mollusca, is of a dull white. The operculum only, and the edge of the mantle are yellowish.

The animal has a head surmounted by broad, rather long tentacles, formed like a pointed horn, and open on the side. The mouth is situated in a flattened, wide, dilated, and quite deeply two-lobed muzzle, separated from the foot by a groove. The respiratory cavity open throughout the whole length of the mantle, bearing on its right margin a long and narrow branchia. The heart has a direction from right to left. The rectum and uterus are attached to each other along the branchiae, and terminate in an ear-shaped gutter, produced by the margin of the mantle. The mucous follicles line the upper wall of the cavity. The foot is round, without a marginal furrow, passing down before in form of an ear-shaped shield, and bearing posteriorly a membranous operculum, with laminas destitute of a spire, which possesses one or two notches to slip upon the folds of the columella.

== Species ==
Species within the genus Pyramidella include:

- Pyramidella adamsi Carpenter, 1864
- Pyramidella africana Bartsch, 1915
- Pyramidella alfredensis Bartsch, 1915
- Pyramidella ava Bartsch, 1926
- Pyramidella bairdi Dall & Bartsch, 1909
- Pyramidella bicolor Menke, 1854
- Pyramidella camara Bartsch, 1927
- † Pyramidella canaliculata Gabb, 1873
- Pyramidella corrugata Lamarck, 1822
- Pyramidella dolabrata (Linnaeus, 1758)
- Pyramidella elenensis Bartsch, 1924
- Pyramidella fastigium (A. Adams, 1855)
- Pyramidella gracilis A. Adams
- Pyramidella guardiarioorum Poppe, Tagaro & Stahlschmidt, 2015
- Pyramidella hancocki Strong & Hertlein, 1939
- Pyramidella hastata (A. Adams in Sowerby, 1854)
- Pyramidella linearum Pilsbry & Lowe, 1932
- Pyramidella magdalenensis Bartsch, 1917
- Pyramidella mexicana Dall & Bartsch, 1909
- Pyramidella minor (E. A. Smith, 1904)
- Pyramidella moffati Dall & Bartsch, 1906
- † Pyramidella nanggulanica Finlay, 1927
- Pyramidella nisoides E. von Martens, 1904
- Pyramidella ovata de Folin, 1873
- Pyramidella panamensis Dall &Bartsch, 1909
- Pyramidella plicata (Laseron, 1959) - unreplaced junior homonym of Pyramidella plicata Lamarck, 1816
- Pyramidella pyrrha Bartsch, 1915
- Pyramidella sanctaehelenae (E. A. Smith, 1890)
- Pyramidella scitula (A. Adams, 1854)
- Pyramidella subdolabrata (Mörch, 1854)
- Pyramidella subglabra Odhner, 1919
- Pyramidella terebelloides (A. Adams, 1854)
- Pyramidella turrita A. Adams, 1855

Taxa inquirenda

- Pyramidella curtissima Locard, 1897
- Pyramidella obeliscus W. H. Turton, 1932
- Pyramidella suavissima Preston, 1905
- Pyramidella sykesi Preston, 1905 (original combination)
- Pyramidella tarpeia Bartsch, 1915

Subgenera and species brought into synonymy

synonyms
- Pyramidella (Agatha) A. Adams, 1860: synonym of Agatha A. Adams, 1860
- Pyramidella (Longchaeus) Mörch, 1875: synonym of Longchaeus Mörch, 1875
- Pyramidella (Syrnola) A. Adams, 1860: synonym of Syrnola A. Adams, 1860
- Pyramidella (Tiberia) Dall & Bartsch, 1906: synonym of Tiberia Jeffreys, 1884
- Pyramidella (Voluspa) Dall & Bartsch, 1904: synonym of Longchaeus Mörch, 1875
- Pyramidella achates (Gould, 1853): synonym of Longchaeus achates (A. Gould, 1853)
- Pyramidella aclis A. Adams, 1853: synonym of Rissosyrnola aclis (A. Adams, 1853) (original combination)
- Pyramidella acus (Gmelin, 1791) - needle pyram: synonym of Longchaeus acus (Gmelin, 1791)
- Pyramidella affinis (Laseron, 1959): synonym of Chrysallida affinis (Laseron, 1959)
- Pyramidella aganea Bartsch, 1915: synonym of Syrnola aganea (Bartsch, 1915)
- Pyramidella ambigua Gould, 1849: synonym of Rissoina ambigua (Gould, 1849) (original combination)
- Pyramidella aprustica Crema, 1903: synonym of Euparthenia bulinea (Lowe, 1841)
- Pyramidella arenosa Conrad, 1843: synonym of Longchaeus suturalis (H. C. Lea, 1843)
- Pyramidella auricoma Dall, 1889: synonym of Longchaeus auricoma (Dall, 1889)
- Pyramidella auriscati (Chemnitz, 1795): synonym of Otopleura auriscati (Holten, 1802)
- Pyramidella balteata (A. Adams, 1855): synonym of Tiberia balteata (A. Adams, 1855)
- Pyramidella canaliculata (G.B. Sowerby III, 1874): synonym of Pyramidella insularum Pilsbry, 1922
- † Pyramidella cancellata Nyst, 1836: synonym of † Sandbergeria cancellata (Nyst, 1836) †
- Pyramidella candida Mørch, 1875: synonym of Longchaeus candidus (Mörch, 1875)
- Pyramidella capensis (Thiele, 1925): synonym of Odostomia capensis Thiele, 1925
- Pyramidella ceylanica Preston, 1905: synonym of Kleinella ceylanica (Preston, 1905)
- Pyramidella cincta Reeve, 1842: synonym of Milda cincta (Reeve, 1842)
- Pyramidella conica C.B. Adams, 1852: synonym of Longchaeus conicus (C.B. Adams, 1852)
- Pyramidella crenulata (Holmes, 1859): synonym of Longchaeus suturalis (H. C. Lea, 1843)
- Pyramidella denticulata (G.B. Sowerby II, 1865): synonym of Colsyrnola ornata (Gould, 1861)
- † Pyramidella diademata Maury, 1917: synonym of Longchaeus suturalis (H. C. Lea, 1843)
- † Pyramidella exarata Michaud, 1838: synonym of † Palaeostoa exarata (Michaud, 1838) (new combination)
- Pyramidella folinii Dall, 1889: synonym of Longchaeus folinii (Dall, 1889)
- Pyramidella fulva G.B. Sowerby II, 1865: synonym of Colsyrnola brunnea (A. Adams, 1854)
- Pyramidella fusca (C. B. Adams, 1839): synonym of Sayella fusca (C. B. Adams, 1839)
- Pyramidella garrettii Tryon, 1886: synonym of Milda garretti (Tryon, 1886)
- Pyramidella glans Reeve, 1842: synonym of Otopleura glans (Reeve, 1842) (original combination)
- Pyramidella halaibensis (Sturany, 1903): synonym of Tropaeas halaibensis (Sturany, 1903)
- Pyramidella hera Bartsch, 1915: synonym of Syrnola hera (Bartsch, 1915)
- Pyramidella humilis Preston, 1905: synonym of Quirella humilis (Preston, 1905)
- Pyramidella inopinata (Schander, 1994): synonym of Longchaeus inopinatus (Schander, 1994)
- Pyramidella insularum Pilsbry, 1922: synonym of Longchaeus insularum (Pilsbry, 1922)
- † Pyramidella jamaicensis Dall, 1896: synonym of † Longchaeus jamaicensis (Dall, 1896)
- † Pyramidella kelirensis (K. Martin, 1916): synonym of † Longchaeus menadensis (Schepman, 1907)
- † Pyramidella laeviuscula S. V. Wood, 1842: synonym of † Longchaeus plicosus (Bronn, 1838)
- Pyramidella lischkei Dall & Bartsch, 1906: synonym of Styloptygma taeniatum (A. Adams, 1863)
- Pyramidella lissa (A. E. Verrill, 1884): synonym of Eulimella lissa A. E. Verrill, 1884
- Pyramidella maculosa Lamarck, 1822: synonym of Longchaeus maculosus (Lamarck, 1822)
- Pyramidella magnifica Adams & Reeve, 1850: synonym of Otopleura auriscati (Holten, 1802)
- Pyramidella mazatlanica Dall & Bartsch, 1909: synonym of Longchaeus mazatlanicus (Dall & Bartsch, 1909)
- Pyramidella mediterranea Monterosato, 1880: synonym of Tiberia minuscula (Monterosato, 1880) (dubious synonym)
- Pyramidella minuscula Monterosato, 1880: synonym of Tiberia minuscula (Monterosato, 1880)
- Pyramidella mitralis A. Adams, 1853: synonym of Otopleura mitralis (A. Adams, 1855)
- Pyramidella modica (A. Adams, 1860): synonym of Syrnola modica(A. Adams, 1860)
- Pyramidella nitida (A. Adams, 1854): synonym of Otopleura nitida (A. Adams, 1854)
- Pyramidella nitidula (A Adams, 1860): synonym of Tiberia nitidula (A. Adams, 1860)
- Pyramidella nivea (Mørch, 1875): synonym of Triptychus niveus (Mørch, 1875)
- Pyramidella norna Bartsch, 1915: synonym of Leucotina elongata G. B. Sowerby III, 1892
- † Pyramidella obtusior Sacco, 1892: synonym of † Longchaeus obtusatus (O. Semper, 1861) † (unjustified emendation of obtusatus)
- Pyramidella octaviana Di Geronimo, 1973: synonym of Tiberia minuscula (Monterosato, 1880)
- † Pyramidella olssoni Maury, 1917: synonym of † Longchaeus olssoni (Maury, 1917)
- Pyramidella ornata (Gould, 1861): synonym of Colsyrnola ornata (Gould, 1861)
- Pyramidella plicata Lamarck, 1816: synonym of Otopleura auriscati (Holten, H.S., 1802) ( junior subjective synonym)
- Pyramidella pratii Bernardi, 1858: synonym of Longchaeus turritus (A. Adams, 1854)
- Pyramidella producta (C. B. Adams, 1840): synonym of Syrnola producta (C. B. Adams, 1840)
- Pyramidella propinqua A. Adams, 1854: synonym of Otopleura mitralis (A. Adams, 1854)
- Pyramidella pulchella (A. Adams, 1854): synonym of Orinella pulchella (A. Adams, 1854)
- Pyramidella punctata Schubert & Wagner, 1829: synonym of Longchaeus acus (Gmelin, 1791) (invalid: homonym and synonym of Pyramidella punctata Férussac, 1821)
- Pyramidella punctata Férussac, 1821: synonym of Longchaeus acus (Gmelin, 1791)
- Pyramidella pupaeformis Souverbie, 1865: synonym of Pyrgulina pupaeformis (Souverbie, 1865)
- Pyramidella resticula (Dall, 1889): synonym of Bacteridium resticulum (Dall, 1889)
- Pyramidella schanderi van Aartsen, Gittenberger & Goud, 1998: synonym of Pyramidella inopinata (Schander, 1994)
- † Pyramidella semicanaliculata Maury, 1917: synonym of Longchaeus suturalis (H. C. Lea, 1843)
- Pyramidella similis Thiele, 1925: synonym of Tiberia analoga van Aartsen & Corgan, 1996
- Pyramidella smithi Verrill, 1881: synonym of Eulimella unifasciata (Forbes, 1844)
- Pyramidella somaliensis Thiele, 1925: synonym of Tiberia somaliensis (Thiele, 1925) (original combination)
- Pyramidella sulcata (A. Adams, 1854): synonym of Pyramidella maculosa Lamarck, 1822: synonym of Longchaeus maculosus (Lamarck, 1822)
- Pyramidella suturalis H. C. Lea, 1843: synonym of Longchaeus suturalis (H. C. Lea, 1843)
- Pyramidella terebellum (O.F. Muller, 1774): synonym of Pyramidella dolabrata terebellum (Müller, 1774): synonym of Pyramidella dolabrata (Linnaeus, 1758)
- Pyramidella teres (A. Adams, 1854): synonym of Tropaeas teres (A. Adams, 1861): synonym of Longchaeus turritus (A. Adams, 1854)
- Pyramidella tessellata (A. Adams, 1854): synonym of Pyramidella sulcata (A. Adams, 1854): synonym of Pyramidella maculosa Lamarck, 1822: synonym of Longchaeus maculosus (Lamarck, 1822)
- Pyramidella umbilicata Thiele, 1925: synonym of Tiberia navella van Aartsen & Corgan, 1996
- Pyramidella unifasciata (Forbes, 1844): synonym of Tibersyrnola unifasciata (Forbes, 1844)
- Pyramidella variegata A. Adams, 1854: synonym of Otopleura mitralis (A. Adams, 1854)
- Pyramidella ventricosa (Forbes, 1844): synonym of Eulimella ventricosa (Forbes, 1844)
- Pyramidella ventricosa Guérin, 1831: synonym of Milda ventricosa (Guérin, 1831)
