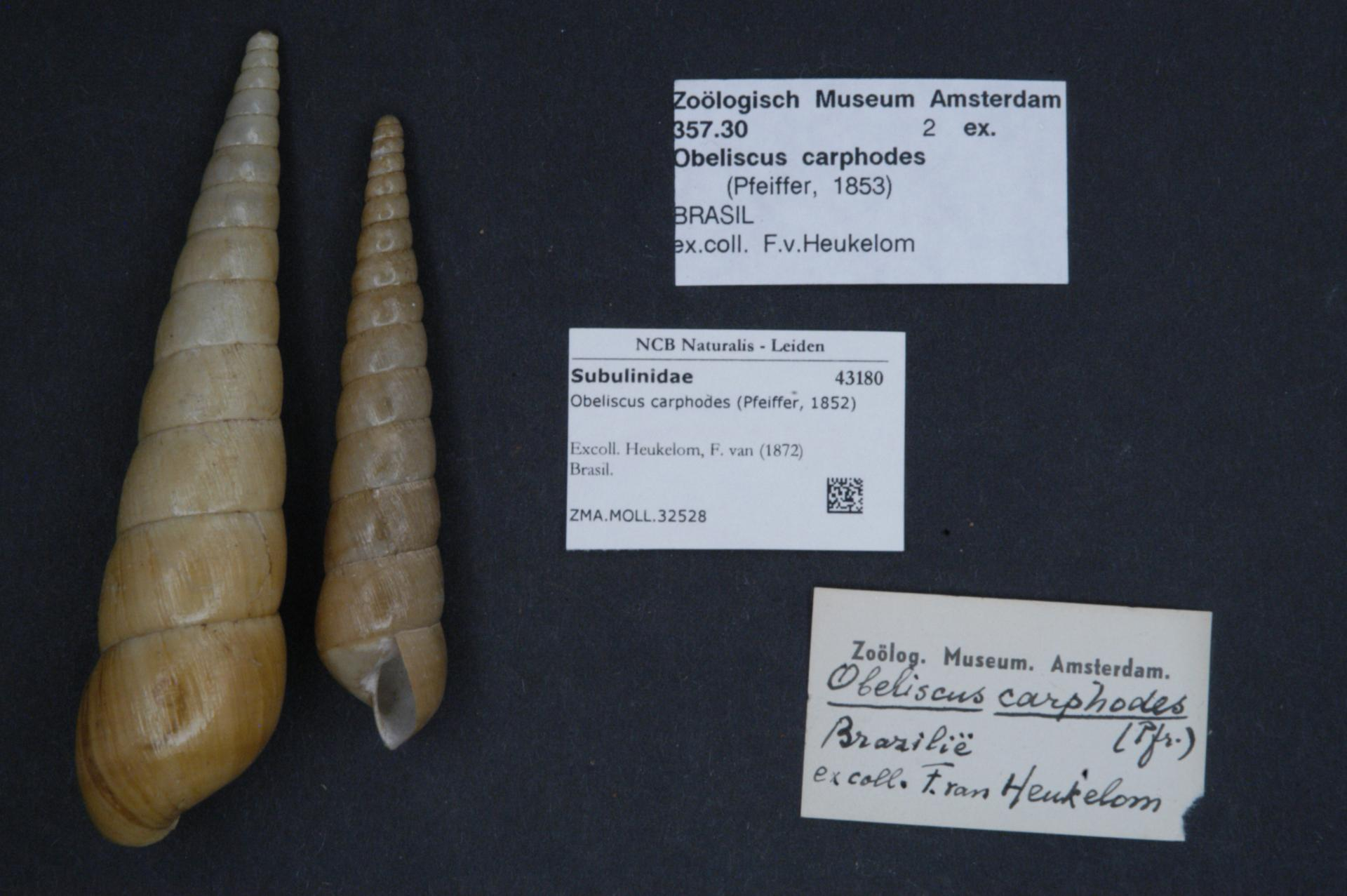
- Obeliscus carphodes preserved shell

Scientific classification
- Kingdom: Animalia
- Phylum: Mollusca
- Class: Gastropoda
- Order: Stylommatophora
- Suborder: Achatinina
- Superfamily: Achatinoidea
- Family: Achatinidae
- Genus: Obeliscus; Beck, 1837

Type species
- Helix obeliscus S. Moricand, 1834

Synonyms
- Bulimus (Obeliscus) H. Beck, 1837 (original rank); Obeliscus (Rectobelus) H. B. Baker, 1927 accepted, alternate representation

= Obeliscus =

Genus of gastropods

Obeliscus is a genus of air-breathing land snails, terrestrial pulmonate gastropod mollusks in the subfamily Stenogyrinae of the family Achatinidae.

== Distribution ==
Species within this genus occur in Brazil, Cuba,...

== Species ==
The genus Obeliscus includes the following species:

- Obeliscus abbotti Vanatta, 1918
- Obeliscus acicularis Aguayo & Jaume, 1957
- Obeliscus agassizi Pilsbry, 1906
- Obeliscus angustatus (Gundlach, 1856)
- Obeliscus bacillus (Pfeiffer, 1861)
- Obeliscus bacterionides (d’Orbigny, 1835)
- Obeliscus basilissa Aguayo & Jaume, 1954
- Obeliscus binneyi Pilsbry, 1906
- Obeliscus blandianus Pilsbry, 1906
- Obeliscus boitata Simone & Salvador, 2016
- Obeliscus carphodes (Pfeiffer, 1852)
- Obeliscus clavus
  - Obeliscus clavus flavus Pilsbry, 1906
- Obeliscus columella (Philippi, 1844)
- Obeliscus gonostoma (Gundlach in Pfeiffer, 1863)
- Obeliscus gundlachi (Pfeiffer, 1863)
- Obeliscus homalogyrus (Shuttleworth in Pfeiffer, 1851)
- Obeliscus lata Gundlach in Pilsbry, 1905
- Obeliscus latispira Pilsbry, 1944
- Obeliscus maximus (Poey, 1854)
- Obeliscus microstoma (Gundlach in Pfeiffer, 1863)
- Obeliscus moderatus Pilsbry, 1933
- Obeliscus obeliscus (Moricand, 1833)
- Obeliscus paradoxus (Arango, 1881)
- Obeliscus pattalus Pilsbry, 1906
- Obeliscus peregrinus (Pfeiffer, 1855)
- Obeliscus petricola Aguayo & Jaume, 1957
- Obeliscus planospirus (Pfeiffer, 1852)
- Obeliscus saugeti Aguayo & Jaume, 1957
- Obeliscus strictus (Poey, 1853)
- Obeliscus subuliformis (Moricand, 1836)
- Obeliscus swiftianus (Pfeiffer, 1852)
- Obeliscus sylvaticus (Spix, 1827)
- Obeliscus virescens (Da Costa, 1898)

Species brought into synonymy

- Obeliscus blandi (L. Pfeiffer, 1854): synonym of Coeliaxis blandi (L. Pfeiffer, 1854)
- Obeliscus brunneus A. Adams, 1854: synonym of Colsyrnola brunnea (A. Adams, 1854)
- Obeliscus cuneus (L. Pfeiffer, 1852): synonym of Protobeliscus cuneus (L. Pfeiffer, 1852) (basionym)
- Obeliscus jousseaumei Cousin, 1887: synonym of Protobeliscus jousseaumei (Cousin, 1887)
- Obeliscus lymneaeformis Melvill & Ponsonby, 1901: synonym of Euonyma lymneaeformis (Melvill & Ponsonby, 1901) (original combination)
- Obeliscus natalensis Burnup, 1905: synonym of Euonyma natalensis (Burnup, 1905) (original combination)
- Obeliscus octogyrus (L. Pfeiffer, 1856): synonym of Stenogyra octogyra (L. Pfeiffer, 1856) (superseded combination)
- Obeliscus terebraster (Lamarck, 1822): synonym of Stenogyra terebraster (Lamarck, 1822) (unaccepted combination)
- Obeliscus tessellatus A. Adams, 1854: synonym of Longchaeus maculosus (Lamarck, 1822)
- Obeliscus triptyx (Pilsbry, 1907): synonym of Ischnocion triptyx (Pilsbry, 1907)

== See also ==
- Obeliscus Gray, 1847 is a synonym of Pyramidella
- Obeliscus Popofsky, 1913 is a genus of protist
