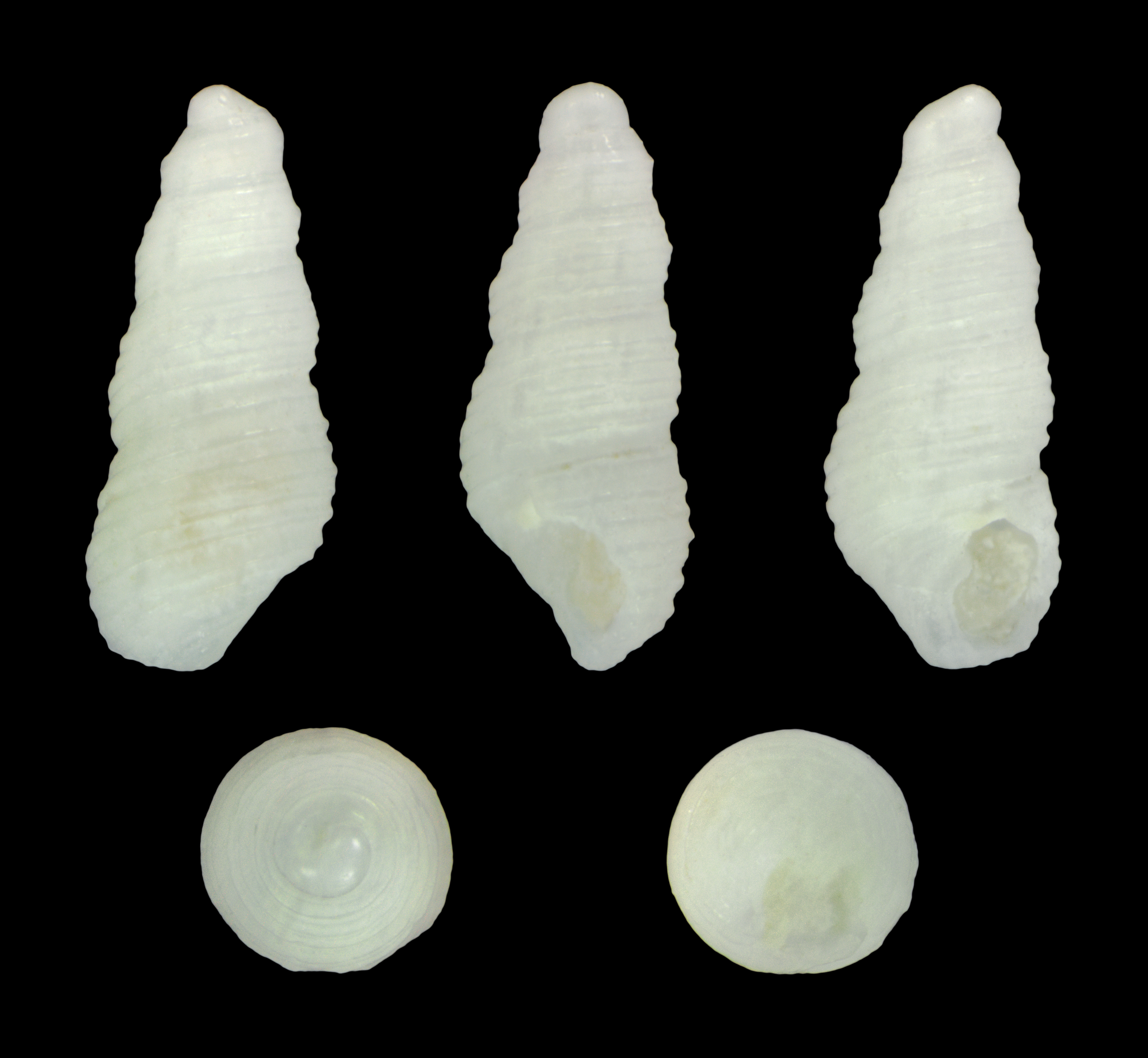
- Kleinella spec

Scientific classification
- Kingdom: Animalia
- Phylum: Mollusca
- Class: Gastropoda
- Family: Pyramidellidae
- Genus: Kleinella; A. Adams, 1860

Type species
- Kleinella cancellaris A. Adams, 1860

Species
- See text.

Synonyms
- Monotigma Gray, 1840

= Kleinella =

Genus of gastropods

Kleinella is a small genus of sea snails, pyramidellid gastropod mollusk or micromollusks. This genus is currently placed in the subfamily Turbonillinae.

== Shell description ==
The original description (Adams, 1860) reads: Testa ovata, tenuis, umbilicata, superficie cancellata; spira producta, apice obtuso. Apertura elongata, antice producta et integra; labio tenui, simplici; labro postice angulato, in medio recto, margine acuto. This genus nearly resembles Actaeon, but without any fold on the columella; the umbilicus, moreover, is wide and deep, and the surface of the shell is cancellated. The other lip forms an angle posteriorly with the last whorl, and is straight in the middle."

The description of the type reads: "K. testa oblonga, late et profunde umbilicata; spira elatiuscula, apice obtuso; pallide fusca; anfractibus 3 1/2 convexiusculis (ultimo ventricoso), regulariter cancellatis; apertura ovali; labio tenui, simplici; labro in medio recto, postice angulato. Long. 1/8 poll. Hab. Straits of Korea; dredged from 63 fathoms.

== Life habits ==
Little is known about the biology of the members of this genus. As is true of most members of the Pyramidellidae sensu lato, they are most likely ectoparasites.

== Species ==
Species within the genus Kleinella include:

- Kleinella amoena
- Kleinella awaziensis Nomura, 1939
- Kleinella cancellaris A. Adams, 1860 - type species
- Kleinella cedrosa (Dall, 1884)
- Kleinella ceylanica (Preston, 1905)
- Kleinella fulva (A. Adams, 1851)
- Kleinella sulcata (A. Adams, 1862)

subgenus Euparthenia

- Kleinella bulinea (Lowe, 1841)
- Kleinella humboldti (Risso, 1826)

== See also ==
- Euparthenia
- Monotygma
