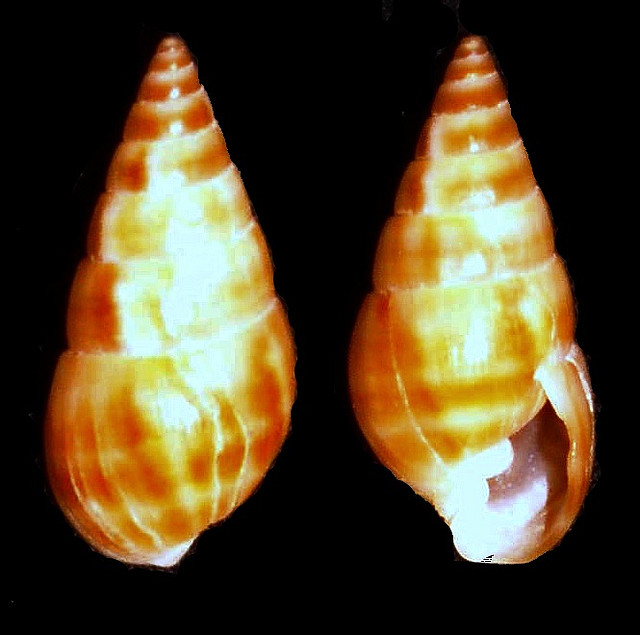
- Two view of a shell of Milda cincta

Scientific classification
- Kingdom: Animalia
- Phylum: Mollusca
- Class: Gastropoda
- Family: Pyramidellidae
- Genus: Milda; Dall & Bartsch, 1904

Type species
- Pyramidella ventricosa Guérin, 1831

= Milda (gastropod) =

Genus of gastropods

Milda is a genus of sea snails, marine gastropod mollusks in the family Pyramidellidae, the pyrams and their allies.

== Species ==
Species within the genus Milda include:

- Milda cincta (Reeve, 1842)
- Milda garretti (Tryon, 1886)
- Milda ogasawarazimana (Nomura, 1939)
- Milda ventricosa (Guérin, 1831)

== Description ==
The umbilicated shell is elongate conic. It increases regularly in size with three folds on the columella. The basal fasciole is present. The surface is less polished than in Pyramidella. It is marked by lines of growth and microscopic spiral striations.
