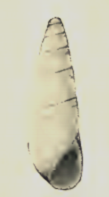
- Drawing of a shell of Pyramidella tarpeia

Scientific classification
- Kingdom: Animalia
- Phylum: Mollusca
- Class: Gastropoda
- Family: Pyramidellidae
- Genus: Pyramidella
- Species: P. tarpeia

Binomial name
- Pyramidella tarpeia Bartsch, 1915

Synonyms
- Syrnola tarpeia Bartsch, 1915

= Pyramidella tarpeia =

Species of gastropod

Pyramidella tarpeia is a species of sea snail, a marine gastropod mollusk in the family Pyramidellidae, the pyrams and their allies.

This species has become a taxon inquirendum.

== Description ==
The small, almost translucent shell has an elongate-conic shape. Its length measures 3.7 mm. The whorls of the protoconch are small, very obliquely immersed in the first of the succeeding turns, above which the rounded, tilted edge of the last volution only projects. The six whorls of the teleoconch are high between the sutures, slightly rounded, and feebly shouldered at the summit. They are marked by retractive fines of growth, and exceedingly fine, spiral striations. The sutures are well impressed. The periphery of the body whorl is well rounded. The base is somewhat prolonged, well rounded, and marked like the spire. The aperture is oval. The posterior angle is acute. The outer lip is thin. The inner lip is very short, decidedly curved, and slightly reflected and appressed. The parietal wall is covered with a moderately thick callus.

== Distribution ==
The type specimen of this marine species was found off Port Alfred, South Africa.
