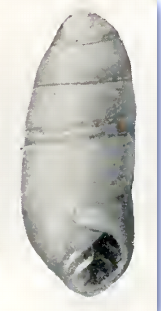
- Drawing of a shell of Pyramidella ava

Scientific classification
- Kingdom: Animalia
- Phylum: Mollusca
- Class: Gastropoda
- Family: Pyramidellidae
- Genus: Pyramidella
- Species: P. ava

Binomial name
- Pyramidella ava Bartsch, 1926

= Pyramidella ava =

Species of gastropod

Pyramidella ava is a species of sea snail, a marine gastropod mollusk in the family Pyramidellidae, the pyrams and their allies.

== Distribution ==
This species occurs in the Pacific Ocean off Ecuador.
