= Pyramidella minor =

Scientific classification
- Kingdom: Animalia
- Phylum: Mollusca
- Class: Gastropoda
- Family: Pyramidellidae
- Genus: Pyramidella
- Species: P. minor

Binomial name
- Pyramidella minor E. A. Smith, 1904

Synonyms
- Eulimella minor E. A. Smith, 1904 (original combination); Syrnola minor (E. A. Smith, 1904)

Species of gastropod

Pyramidella minor is a species of sea snail, a marine gastropod mollusk in the family Pyramidellidae, the pyrams and their allies.

== Distribution ==
The type specimen of this marine species was found off Port Alfred, South Africa.
