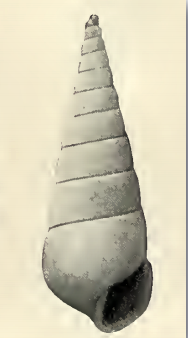
- Drawing of a shell of Pyramidella alfredensis

Scientific classification
- Kingdom: Animalia
- Phylum: Mollusca
- Class: Gastropoda
- Family: Pyramidellidae
- Genus: Pyramidella
- Species: P. alfredensis

Binomial name
- Pyramidella alfredensis (Bartsch, 1915)

Synonyms
- Orinella alfredensis (Bartsch, 1915); Pyramidella (Orinella) alfredensis Bartsch, 1915

= Pyramidella alfredensis =

Species of gastropod

Pyramidella alfredensis is a species of sea snail, a marine gastropod mollusk in the family Pyramidellidae, the pyrams and their allies.

== Description ==
The milk-white shell has an elongate-conic shape. The 1¾ whorls of the protoconch are very small. They are planorboid, having their axis at right angles to that of succeeding turns. The left side of the nucleus projects considerably beyond the outline of the spire of the teleoconch . The ten whorls of the teleoconch are almost flat and are feebly shouldered at the summit. They are marked by exceedingly fine, retractive, incremental lines, and numerous microscopic spiral striations. The suture is moderately constricted. The periphery of the body whorl is well rounded. The base of the shell is well rounded, decidedly umbilicated, and marked like the spire. The aperture is subquadrate. The posterior angle is acute. The outer lip is thin. The inner lip is very oblique, and decidedly reflected. It is provided with a strong fold near its insertion. The parietal wall is glazed with a thin callus.

== Distribution ==
This marine species occurs off Port Alfred, South Africa.
