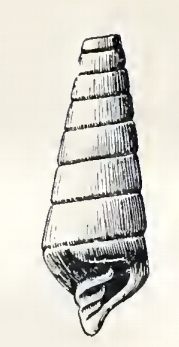
- Drawing of a shell of Pyramidella bicolor

Scientific classification
- Kingdom: Animalia
- Phylum: Mollusca
- Class: Gastropoda
- Family: Pyramidellidae
- Genus: Pyramidella
- Species: P. bicolor

Binomial name
- Pyramidella bicolor Menke, 1854

Synonyms
- Pyramidella (Longchaeus) bicolor Menke, 1854

= Pyramidella bicolor =

Species of gastropod

Pyramidella bicolor is a species of sea snail, a marine gastropod mollusk in the family Pyramidellidae, the pyrams and their allies.

== Description ==
The shining shell has an elongate-conic shape. The early whorls are white, the succeeding ones gradually acquiring a pinkish tinge, which deepens and finally tints the last whorl rose-purple. The length of the shell varies between 8 mm and 10 mm. (The whorls of the protoconch are decollated). The eight whorls of the teleoconch are overhanging, flattened, slightly shouldered and minutely crenulated, and deeply sulcate at the periphery. The sutures are strongly impressed. The base of the shell is short, moderately rounded, and with a weak fasciole at the insertion of the columella. The outer lip of the type specimen was badly fractured. The columella is conic, and moderately strong. It is provided with a strong lamellar fold at its insertion, a moderately strong median one and a weaker anterior to it; the last two much more oblique than the posterior.

== Distribution ==
This marine species occurs in the Pacific Ocean along southern Pacific Mexico to Costa Rica.
