= Pyramidella hancocki =

Scientific classification
- Kingdom: Animalia
- Phylum: Mollusca
- Class: Gastropoda
- Family: Pyramidellidae
- Genus: Pyramidella
- Species: P. hancocki

Binomial name
- Pyramidella hancocki Strong & Hertlein, 1939

Species of gastropod

Pyramidella hancocki is a species of sea snail, a marine gastropod mollusk in the family Pyramidellidae, the pyrams and their allies.

== Description ==
The length of its seashell is around 8.8 mm and its diameter is around 2.8 mm. Its slender shell is dull brown in color with a distinct sulcus on the periphery. As a member of the Pyramidella genus, it has a conic and elongated shell. Its columella may have one to three folds.

== Distribution ==
This species is found in the Pacific Ocean, off Panama Bay, where specimens have been dredged at depths of 5 to 16 metres .
