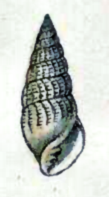
- Drawing of a shell of Pyramidella corrugata

Scientific classification
- Kingdom: Animalia
- Phylum: Mollusca
- Class: Gastropoda
- Family: Pyramidellidae
- Genus: Pyramidella
- Species: P. corrugata

Binomial name
- Pyramidella corrugata Lamarck, 1822

= Pyramidella corrugata =

Species of gastropod

Pyramidella corrugata is a species of sea snail, a marine gastropod mollusk in the family Pyramidellidae, the pyrams and their allies.

== Description ==
The length of the shell attains 23 mm.

The elongated shell is slender and turreted. It is white, with small sparse, scattered yellow spots near the suture. The pointed spire is formed of nine or ten slightly convex whorls, the surface of which is covered with longitudinal folds, also convex, very distinct, smooth, numerous, regular, prolonged even to the summit of the whorls, and accompanied with some small, scattered, yellowish spots. Numerous compressed transverse striae are found between the interstices. The suture is linear. The narrow aperture is ovate, elongated, and slightly narrowed at its extremities. It forms at its base a little depression in an oblique siphonal canal. The outer lip is thin and arcuate. The columella is imperforate at its base. iI is slightly arcuated, thin, furnished with three folds, the first more strongly marked than the others, which are a little oblique.

== Distribution ==
This marine species occurs in the following locations:

- Tanzania
- La Réunion.
