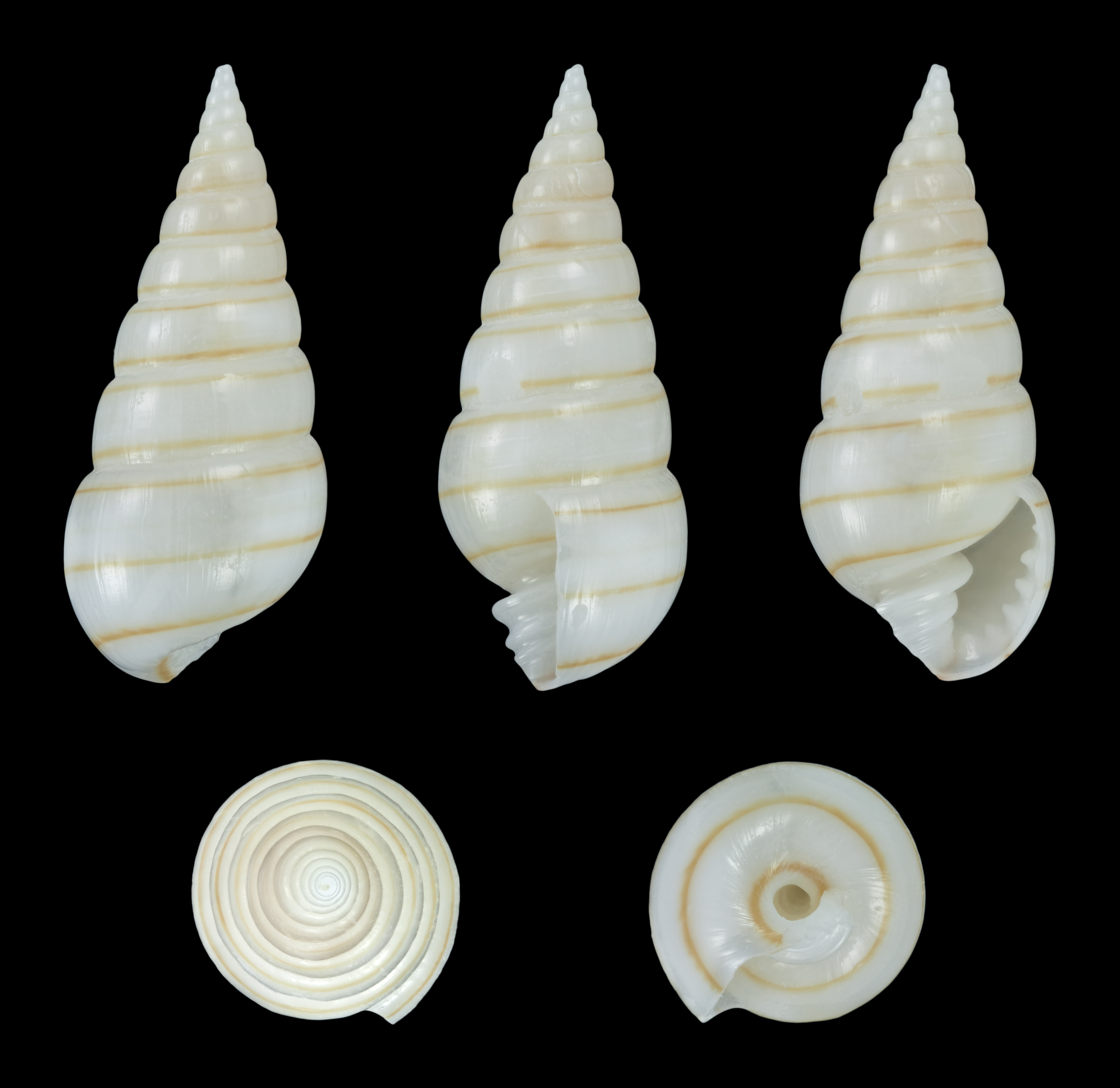
- A shell of Pyramidella terebelloides

Scientific classification
- Kingdom: Animalia
- Phylum: Mollusca
- Class: Gastropoda
- Family: Pyramidellidae
- Genus: Pyramidella
- Species: P. terebelloides

Binomial name
- Pyramidella terebelloides (A. Adams, 1855)

Synonyms
- Obeliscus terebelloides A. Adams, 1855 (basionym)

= Pyramidella terebelloides =

Species of gastropod

Pyramidella terebelloides, common name the augur-like pyram, is a species of sea snail, a marine gastropod mollusk in the family Pyramidellidae, the pyrams and their allies.

== Description ==
The shell is more slender than Pyramidella dolabrata terebellum. The columella has two plicae instead of three. The whorls of the teleoconch contain two or three slim chestnut lines. The length varies between 14 mm and 25 mm.

== Distribution ==
This marine species occurs in the following locations:

- Red Sea
- Tanzania
- South Africa
- the Philippines.
