= Pyramidella subglabra =

Scientific classification
- Kingdom: Animalia
- Phylum: Mollusca
- Class: Gastropoda
- Family: Pyramidellidae
- Genus: Pyramidella
- Species: P. subglabra

Binomial name
- Pyramidella subglabra Odhner, 1919

Species of gastropod

Pyramidella subglabra is a species of sea snail, a marine gastropod mollusk in the family Pyramidellidae, the pyrams and their allies.

== Distribution ==
This species occurs in the following locations:

- Madagascar

== Notes ==
Additional information regarding this species:

- Type locality: Type locality: Magunja, Madagascar
