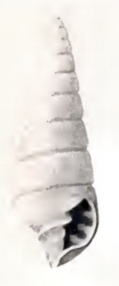
- Drawing of a shell of Pyramidella magdalenensis

Scientific classification
- Kingdom: Animalia
- Phylum: Mollusca
- Class: Gastropoda
- Family: Pyramidellidae
- Genus: Pyramidella
- Species: P. magdalenensis

Binomial name
- Pyramidella magdalenensis Bartsch, 1917

= Pyramidella magdalenensis =

Species of gastropod

Pyramidella magdalenensis is a species of sea snail, a marine gastropod mollusk in the family Pyramidellidae, the pyrams and their allies.

== Description ==
The very pale horn yellow shell has an elongate conic shape. Its length measures 5.8 mm. The two whorls of the protoconch are well rounded, forming a depressed helicoid spire, the axis of which is at right angles to that of the succeeding turns, in the first of which it is about one-third immersed. The nine whorls of the teleoconch are flattened. They are narrowly shouldered at the summit with a deep spiral groove at the periphery which shows in the suture of all the turns and gives this the appearance of being deeply channeled. The summit of the whorls is strongly crenulated. The weak depressions on the sides of the crenulation pass down the sides of whorls for a short distance below the summit. The rest of the surface is marked by fine lines of growth and exceedingly fine spiral striations. The deep peripheral sulcus is crossed by slender axial riblets, which are more slender and more numerous than the crenulations at the summit of the whorls. The base of the shell is moderately long, and well rounded. It is provided with a strong fasciole at the anterior end and marked by rather strong incremental lines and very fine spiral striations. The aperture is oval. The posterior angle is acute. The outer lip is thin, showing four denticles within, of which the median two are the strongest. The inner lip is thick, almost straight, and provided with three folds, of which the first is lamellar and almost transversely disposed. It covers the posterior portion of the basal fasciole. The other two folds are much weaker and much more obliquely placed and extend to the anterior portion of the columella. The parietal wall is glazed with a thin callus.

== Distribution ==
The type specimen was found in the Pacific Ocean off Magdalena Bay, Baja California Sur.
