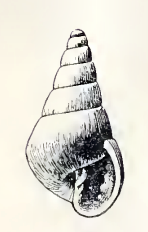
- Drawing of a shell of Pyramidella bairdi

Scientific classification
- Kingdom: Animalia
- Phylum: Mollusca
- Class: Gastropoda
- Family: Pyramidellidae
- Genus: Pyramidella
- Species: P. bairdi

Binomial name
- Pyramidella bairdi Dall & Bartsch, 1909

= Pyramidella bairdi =

Species of gastropod

Pyramidella bairdi is a species of very small sea snail, a marine gastropod mollusk in the family Pyramidellidae, the pyrams and their allies.

This species was named for William Baird (1803-1872), a British zoologist.

== Description ==
The broadly conic shell has a milk-white color, with a narrow pale yellow band at the periphery. The shell grows to a length of 5.1 mm. It is deeply, broadly umbilicated. There are least 2½ whorls in the protoconch. They form a depressed helicoid spire, whose axis is at right angles to that of the succeeding turns, in the first of which it is about one-half immersed. The six whorls of the teleoconch are well rounded, faintly roundly shouldered at the summit. The sutures are well impressed. The periphery and the base of the body whorl are somewhat inflated, and well rounded. The entire surface of the spire and the base are marked by exceedingly fine lines of growth, and microscopic closely spaced spiral striations. The aperture is rather large. The posterior angle is acute. The outer lip is thick within, where it is reinforced by six short spiral lirations, three of which fall anterior and three posterior to the periphery. The columella is straight and slender. It is provided with three folds, the posterior of one of which is strongly lamellar and at some little distance anterior to the insertion; the other two are less strongly developed and much more oblique.

== Distribution ==
This species occurs in the Gulf of California, Mexico.
