= Pyramidella scitula =

Scientific classification
- Kingdom: Animalia
- Phylum: Mollusca
- Class: Gastropoda
- Family: Pyramidellidae
- Genus: Pyramidella
- Species: P. scitula

Binomial name
- Pyramidella scitula (A. Adams, 1854)

Species of gastropod

Pyramidella scitula is a species of sea snail, a marine gastropod mollusk in the family Pyramidellidae, the pyrams and their allies.

== Distribution ==
This species occurs in the following locations:

- Tanzania
