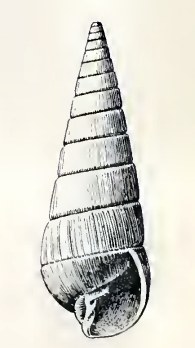
- Drawing of a shell of Pyramidella mexicana

Scientific classification
- Kingdom: Animalia
- Phylum: Mollusca
- Class: Gastropoda
- Family: Pyramidellidae
- Genus: Pyramidella
- Species: P. mexicana

Binomial name
- Pyramidella mexicana Dall & Bartsch, 1909

Synonyms
- Pyramidella (Longchaeus) mexicana Dall & Bartsch, 1909

= Pyramidella mexicana =

Species of gastropod

Pyramidella mexicana is a species of sea snail, a marine gastropod mollusk in the family Pyramidellidae, the pyrams and their allies.

== Description ==
The large, robust shell has a broadly conic shape. Its color is dull brown. (The whorls of the protoconch are decollated). All but the last whorl of the fourteen whorls of the teleoconch are flattened, flatly shouldered and crenulated at the summit. The body whorl is inflated and well rounded. The periphery of the body whorl is marked by a strong sulcus. The sutures are channeled. The entire surface of the spire and the base is marked by lines of growth, which are quite prominent on the last turn. The base of the shell is inflated, strongly rounded, and with a slender fasciole at the insertion of the columella. The aperture is oval. The posterior angle is acute; slightly channeled anteriorly. The outer lip is thin, with a white band at the periphery, the remainder brown with darker colored lines,. It is reinforced deeply within by five spiral cords, two of which are posterior and three anterior to the periphery. The columella is stout, conic, with a strong lamellar fold at its insertion and two much more oblique ones anterior to it.

== Distribution ==
This species occurs in the Pacific Ocean off Baja California peninsula.
