= Pyramidella linearum =

Scientific classification
- Kingdom: Animalia
- Phylum: Mollusca
- Class: Gastropoda
- Family: Pyramidellidae
- Genus: Pyramidella
- Species: P. linearum

Binomial name
- Pyramidella linearum Pilsbry & Lowe, 1932

Species of gastropod

Pyramidella linearum is a species of sea snail, a marine gastropod mollusk in the family Pyramidellidae, the pyrams and their allies.

== Description ==
The length of the shell varies between 10 mm and 16 mm.

== Distribution ==
This species occurs in the Pacific Ocean between Mexico and Panama.
