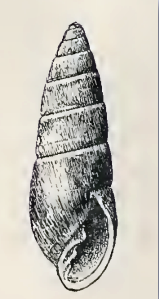
- Drawing of a shell of Pyramidella moffati

Scientific classification
- Kingdom: Animalia
- Phylum: Mollusca
- Class: Gastropoda
- Family: Pyramidellidae
- Genus: Pyramidella
- Species: P. moffati

Binomial name
- Pyramidella moffati Dall & Bartsch, 1906

Synonyms
- Obeliscus clavulus A. Adams, 1854; Pyramidella (Pharcidella) moffati Dall & Bartsch, 1906

= Pyramidella moffati =

Species of gastropod

Pyramidella moffati is a species of sea snail, a marine gastropod mollusk in the family Pyramidellidae, the pyrams and their allies.

== Description ==
The strong shell moderately large, its length measuring 11.5 mm. The early part of the spire is broadly conic, and later subcylindric. The color of the shell is white, marked diversely with various shades of rust brown. (The whorls of the protoconch are decollated). The nine whorls of the teleoconch are moderately rounded. They are scarcely at all contracted at the periphery. They are narrowly shouldered at the summit, which is finely crenulated. They are marked by many lines of growth, some of which are a little stronger than the rest, the stronger corresponding to the crenulations at the summit and lend the surface the appearance of being obsoletely ribbed. The periphery of the whorls is marked by a slender well-impressed spiral channel, which is not apparent in the suture in the first four whorls, but from the fifth on, the summit of the whorl drops more and comes more anterior to the peripheral sulcus until, on the body whorl, it is about one-fifth of the distance between the whorls posterior to the suture. The base of the body whorl is rather prolonged, and marked by lines of growth, provided with a strong basal fasciole. The aperture is ear-shaped. The posterior angle is acute. The outer lip is thin, marked in the following manner within : a white band immediately below the summit, one-fourth of the width of the space between the sutures, followed by an. interrupted band of dark rust brown, succeeded by a broad area, clouded with various shades of rust brown which connect the dark colored band with the white columellar area. The columella is moderately strong. It is provided with three oblique folds, the posterior one of which is lamellar. The parietal wall is covered with a thin callus.

== Distribution ==
This marine species occurs in the Pacific Ocean from Mexico to Ecuador.
