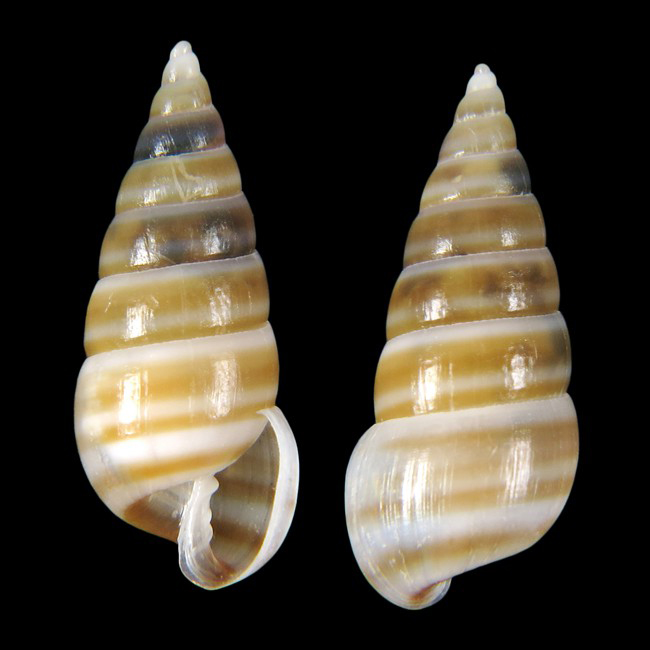

Scientific classification
- Kingdom: Animalia
- Phylum: Mollusca
- Class: Gastropoda
- Family: Pyramidellidae
- Genus: Pyramidella
- Species: P. guardiarioorum

Binomial name
- Pyramidella guardiarioorum Poppe, Tagaro & Stahlschmidt, 2015

= Pyramidella guardiarioorum =

Species of gastropod

Pyramidella guardiarioorum is a species of sea snail, a marine gastropod mollusck in the family Pyramidellidae.

== Original description ==
- Poppe G.T., Tagaro S.P. & Stahlschmidt P. (2015). New shelled molluscan species from the central Philippines I. Visaya. 4(3): 15-59.

page(s): 30, pl. 12 figs 1-3.
