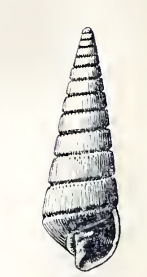
- Drawing of a shell of Pyramidella panamensis

Scientific classification
- Kingdom: Animalia
- Phylum: Mollusca
- Class: Gastropoda
- Family: Pyramidellidae
- Genus: Pyramidella
- Species: P. panamensis

Binomial name
- Pyramidella panamensis Dall & Bartsch, 1909

Synonyms
- Pyramidella (Pharcidella) panamensis Dall & Bartsch, 1909

= Pyramidella panamensis =

Species of gastropod

Pyramidella panamensis is a species of sea snail, a marine gastropod mollusk in the family Pyramidellidae, the pyrams and their allies.

== Description ==
The slender shell has an elongate-conic shape. Its color is horn-yellow, excepting the body whorl which is suffused with, pale rose-purple. Its length measures 8.8 mm. The 2½ whorls of the protoconch are small and form a depressed helicoid spire, whose axis is at right angles to that of the succeeding turns, in the first of which it is a little more than half immersed. The twelve whorls of the teleoconch are flattened. They are flatly shouldered at the summit, which is crenulated and decidedly channeled at the periphery. They are marked on the posterior half by feeble riblets which disappear before reaching the middle of the whorl. The sutures are strongly channeled. The periphery of the body whorl has a deep sulcus, which is crossed by numerous very slender and closely spaced axial riblets. The base of the shell is well rounded, with a strong fasciole about the columella. The aperture is oval. The posterior angle is acute, and slightly channeled anteriorly. The outer lip is thin. The columella is slender, and revolute. It is provided with a lamellar posterior fold at the insertion of the columella, and two equally slender, very oblique ones anterior to it.

== Distribution ==
This marine species occurs in the Pacific Ocean off Panama Bay.
