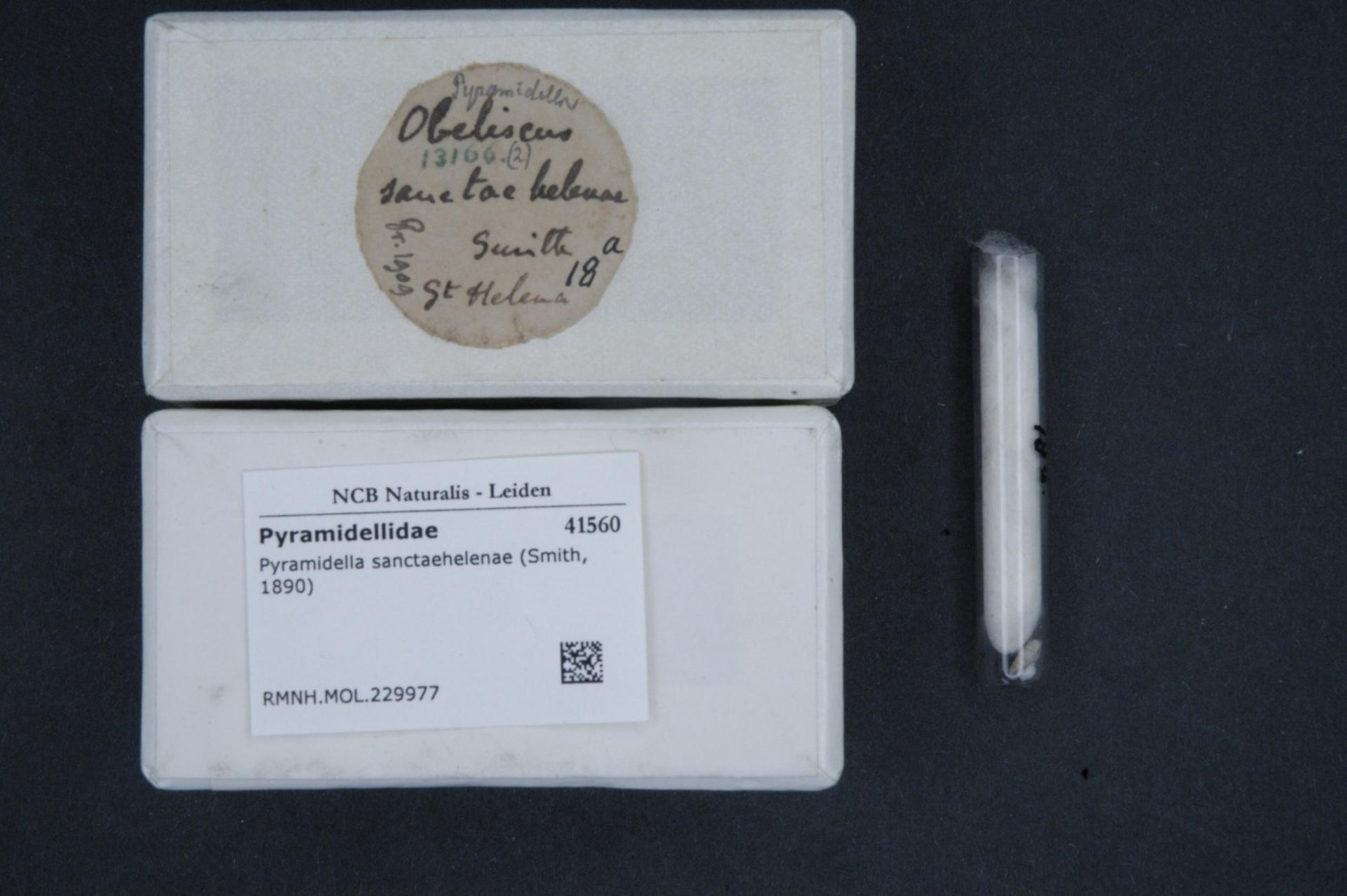

Scientific classification
- Kingdom: Animalia
- Phylum: Mollusca
- Class: Gastropoda
- Family: Pyramidellidae
- Genus: Pyramidella
- Species: P. sanctaehelenae

Binomial name
- Pyramidella sanctaehelenae (E. A. Smith, 1890)

= Pyramidella sanctaehelenae =

Species of gastropod

Pyramidella sanctaehelenae is a species of sea snail, a marine gastropod mollusk in the family Pyramidellidae, the pyrams and their allies.

== Description ==
The shell grows to a length of 6.5 mm.

== Distribution ==
This species occurs in the Atlantic Ocean off Saint Helena.
