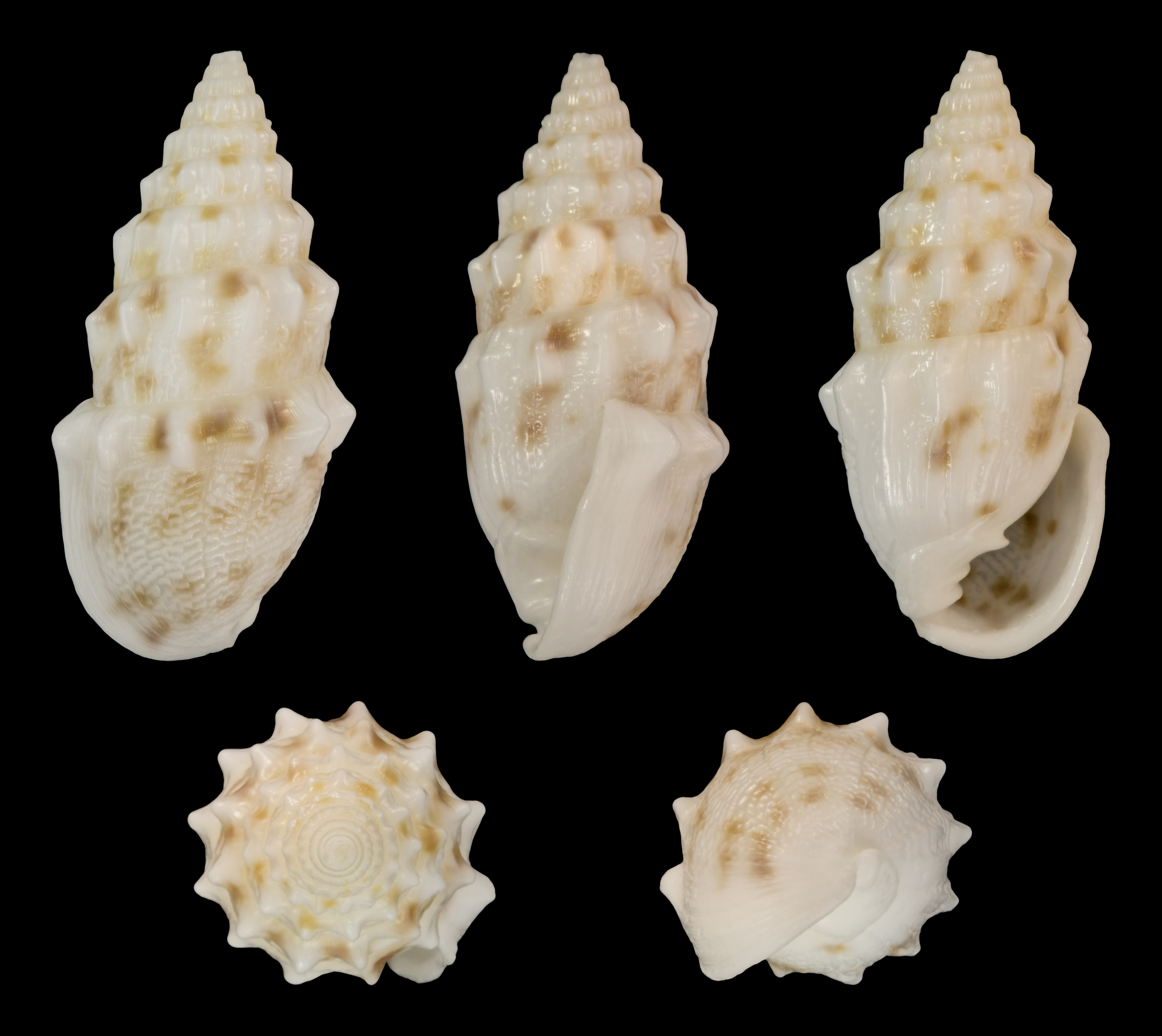

Scientific classification
- Kingdom: Animalia
- Phylum: Mollusca
- Class: Gastropoda
- Family: Pyramidellidae
- Genus: Otopleura
- Species: O. nodicincta

Binomial name
- Otopleura nodicincta (A. Adams, 1855)

Synonyms
- Fusus nodicinctus A. Adams, 1855 (basionym); Pyramidella (Otopleura) nodicincta A. Adams, 1855

= Otopleura nodicincta =

Species of gastropod

Otopleura nodicincta, common name the nodulose pyram, is a species of sea snail, a marine gastropod mollusk in the family Pyramidellidae, the pyrams and their allies.

== Description ==
The white shell is covered with spiral rows of chestnut spots. The whorls of the teleoconch are angulated above, with longitudinal ribs produced into nodules at the angles. The lower part of body whorl is pitted, forming a sort of network between the pits. The length of the shell varies between 11 mm and 25 mm.

== Distribution ==
This marine species occurs in the following locations:

- Indo-Pacific Region
- Aldabra
- the Philippines, Guam, French Polynesia
- Japan
