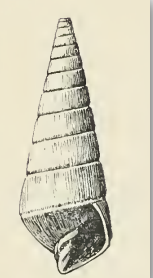
- Drawing of a shell of Pyramidella adamsi

Scientific classification
- Kingdom: Animalia
- Phylum: Mollusca
- Class: Gastropoda
- Family: Pyramidellidae
- Genus: Pyramidella
- Species: P. adamsi

Binomial name
- Pyramidella adamsi Carpenter, 1864

Synonyms
- Obeliscus conicus Carpenter, 1856; Obeliscus variegatus Carpenter, 1864; Pyramidella (Longchaeus) adamsi Carpenter, 1864

= Pyramidella adamsi =

Species of gastropod

Pyramidella adamsi, common name the Adams' pyram, is a species of sea snail, a marine gastropod mollusk in the family Pyramidellidae, the pyrams and their allies.

This species was named for Charles Baker Adams (1814-1853), an American naturalist.

== Description ==
The slender shell has an elongate-conic shape. The early whorls are white, later ones diversely variegated, frequently dark brown, yellowish-brown or purplish-brown on the later turns. It is this striking variegated color pattern which at once distinguishes this species from the other West American forms. The length of the shell varies between 11 mm and 19 mm. The spaces between the sutures are crossed by light areas, which are vertical in the middle, bending suddenly forward at the periphery and the summit, thus forming )-shaped areas. The space immediately below the peripheral sulcus on the base has short light areas, corresponding to those above the sulcus, but with retractive slant. The space between these light areas, near the summit, forms a series of elongated dark spots. The varices which are disposed at irregular intervals are chestnut brown, preceded usually by a band of white. The posterior half of the base is light chestnut brown; the anterior white.

The whorls of the protoconch are small, two, forming a planorboid spire whose axis is at right angles to that of the succeeding turns, in the first of which it is about one-half immersed. The twelve whorls of the teleoconch are flattened. They are moderately shouldered at the summit, which is crenulated. The periphery at the body whorl contains a strong sulcus. The base of the shell is moderately long, and well rounded. The entire surface of the spire and the base is marked by fine lines of growth and exceedingly fine, microscopic spiral striations. The aperture is oval;. The convex outer lip is thin, showing the following color markings within: a white zone at the periphery, a narrow chestnut band immediately posterior to the periphery and another at the summit, a broad band extending over half the base immediately below the peripheral zone. Deep within, the lip is reinforced by five strong, spiral cords, one at the periphery, two on the base, and two between the periphery and the summit. The siphonal canal is short. The thin columella is strong, and provided with a strong fasciole. The posterior fold is very strong, and lamellar: the anterior two are very oblique, and slender.

== Distribution ==
This species occurs in the Pacific Ocean on sand and mud along the low-tide zone off San Diego and the Gulf of California.
