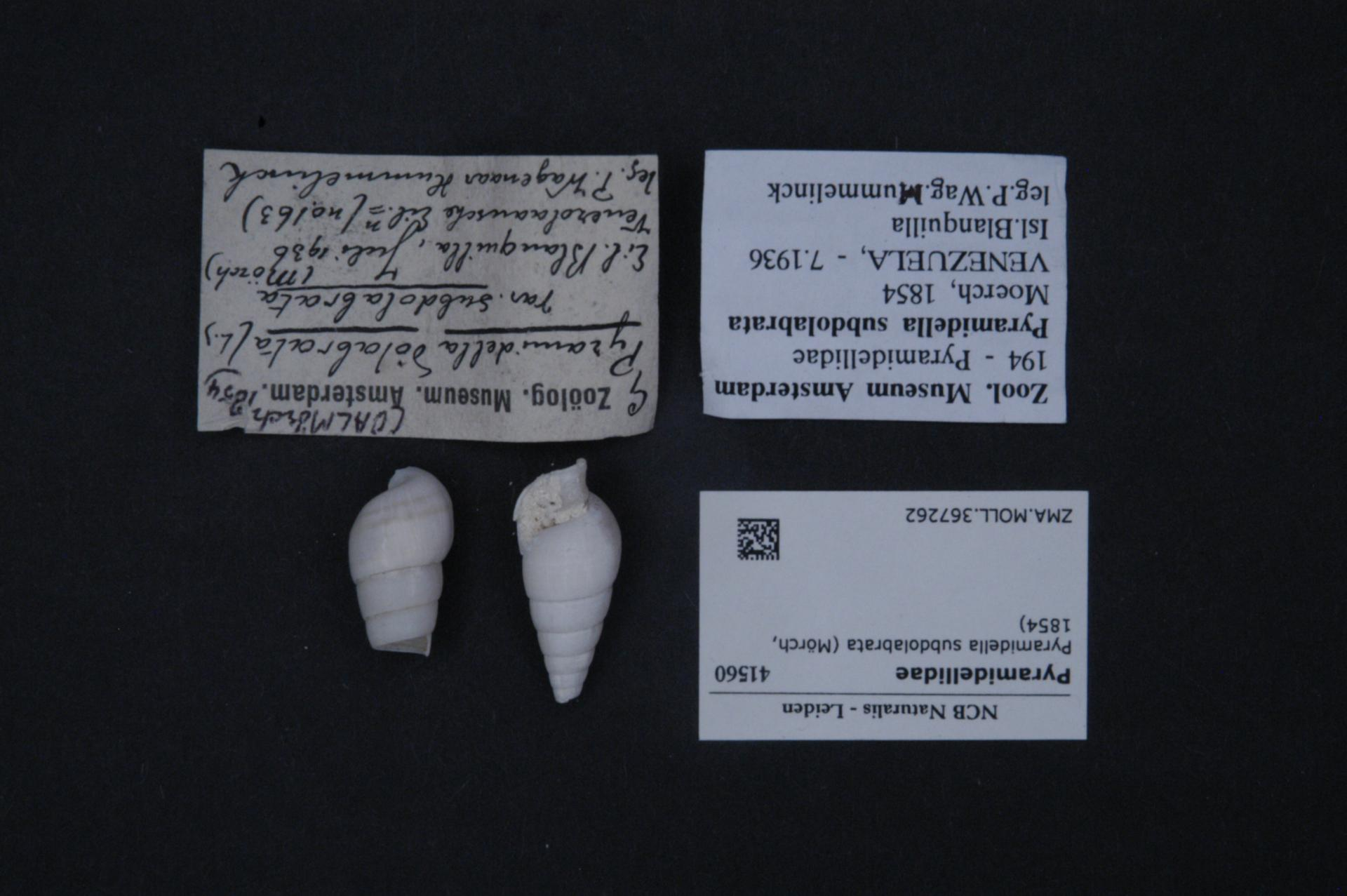

Scientific classification
- Kingdom: Animalia
- Phylum: Mollusca
- Class: Gastropoda
- Family: Pyramidellidae
- Genus: Pyramidella
- Species: P. subdolabrata

Binomial name
- Pyramidella subdolabrata (Mörch, 1854)

= Pyramidella subdolabrata =

Species of gastropod

Pyramidella subdolabrata is a species of sea snail, a marine gastropod mollusk in the family Pyramidellidae, the pyrams and their allies.

== Description ==
The shell grows to a length of 30 mm.

== Distribution ==
This marine species occurs off Puerto Rico, the Virgin Islands, and Anguilla.
