= Pyramidella ovata =

Scientific classification
- Kingdom: Animalia
- Phylum: Mollusca
- Class: Gastropoda
- Family: Pyramidellidae
- Genus: Pyramidella
- Species: P. ovata

Binomial name
- Pyramidella ovata de Folin, 1873

Species of snail

Pyramidella ovata is a species of sea snail, a marine gastropod mollusk in the family Pyramidellidae.
