= Pyramidella elenensis =

Scientific classification
- Kingdom: Animalia
- Phylum: Mollusca
- Class: Gastropoda
- Family: Pyramidellidae
- Genus: Pyramidella
- Species: P. elenensis

Binomial name
- Pyramidella elenensis Bartsch, 1924

Species of gastropod

Pyramidella elenensis is a species of sea snail, a marine gastropod mollusk in the family Pyramidellidae, the pyrams and their allies.

== Description ==
The shell grows to a length of 9 mm.

== Distribution ==
This species occurs in the Pacific Ocean off Ecuador.
