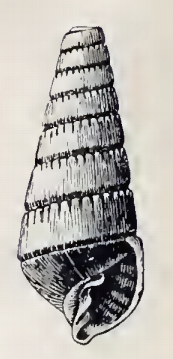
- Drawing of a shell of Pyramidella hastata

Scientific classification
- Kingdom: Animalia
- Phylum: Mollusca
- Class: Gastropoda
- Family: Pyramidellidae
- Genus: Pyramidella
- Species: P. hastata

Binomial name
- Pyramidella hastata (A. Adams in Sowerby, 1854)

Synonyms
- Obeliscus hastatus A. Adams, 1854; Pyramidella (Pharcidella) hastata A. Adams, 1854

= Pyramidella hastata =

Species of gastropod

Pyramidella hastata is a species of sea snail, a marine gastropod mollusk in the family Pyramidellidae, the pyrams and their allies.

== Description ==
The shining shell has a broadly elongate, conic shape. Its color is pale yellowish to flesh-color, irregularly clouded with light brown. The length of the shell measures 11.5 mm. (The whorls of the protoconch are decollated). The (probably) fourteen whorls of the teleoconch are flattened. They are decidedly crenulated at their summits, with faint grooves extending from the base of the crenulations down and across the whorls giving them the appearance of being obsoletely ribbed. The sutures are deep and channeled. The periphery of the body whorl is angular, and deeply sulcate. This sulcus is more or less regularly closely transversely ribbed. The base of the shell is well rounded, axially striated. These striae extend to the umbilical region and over the posterior columellar fold. The basal fasciole is present. The entire surface is covered with microscopic spiral striations. The aperture is suboval, subchanneled at the junction of the outer lip and columella. The posterior angle is acute. The columella is straight and strong. The posterior fold is very strong, and lamellar slightly oblique. The anterior two are of about equal size and much more oblique than the posterior one. The inner surface of the outer lip is provided at intervals with five lirations, two posterior and three anterior to the peripheral sulcus.

== Distribution ==
This marine species occurs in the Pacific Ocean off Mexico, to Panama and off the Galapagos Islands.
