= Pyramidella camara =

Scientific classification
- Kingdom: Animalia
- Phylum: Mollusca
- Class: Gastropoda
- Family: Pyramidellidae
- Genus: Pyramidella
- Species: P. camara

Binomial name
- Pyramidella camara Bartsch, 1927

Species of gastropod

Pyramidella camara is a species of sea snail, a marine gastropod mollusk in the family Pyramidellidae, the pyrams, and their allies.

== Description ==
The shell grows to a length of 2.8 mm.

Its feeding type is parasitic.

== Distribution ==
This species occurs in the Atlantic Ocean off Georgia, USA. It also occurs off of the Philippines.
