= Pyramidella gracilis =

- Drawing of a shell of Pyramidella gracilis

Scientific classification
- Kingdom: Animalia
- Phylum: Mollusca
- Class: Gastropoda
- Family: Pyramidellidae
- Genus: Pyramidella
- Species: P. gracilis

Binomial name
- Pyramidella gracilis A. Adams, 1854

Species of gastropod

Pyramidella gracilis is a species of sea snail, a marine gastropod mollusk in the family Pyramidellidae, the pyrams and their allies.

== Description ==
The length of the shell varies between 6 mm and 10 mm.

The whitish, shining shell has a chestnut line above the suture, and on the periphery of the body whorl; The whorls of the teleoconch are flattened, distantly longitudinally costate, and with smooth interstices.

The narrow shell is cylindrical, very pointed at its summit, slender, turreted, brilliant, whitish, slightly striated longitudinally. The elongated spire is formed of fifteen or sixteen somewhat distinct, approximate, convex whorls. The body whorl is divided at its middle by a transverse, narrow, shallow stria. The suture is simple, indistinctly channeled and flattened. The small aperture is oblong and a little narrowed at its extremities. The columella is almost straight, a little turreted at its base, and provided with three folds, the first of which is more marked. The thin outer lip is sharp and obliquely sinuous in the middle of its length. Its lower extremity extends a little beyond the columella, and forms in this part a shallow contraction or little gutter.

== Distribution ==
This marine species occurs in the following locations:

- Red Sea
- the Philippines
- Japan
