= Pyramidella turrita =

- Drawing of a shell of Pyramidella turrita

Scientific classification
- Kingdom: Animalia
- Phylum: Mollusca
- Class: Gastropoda
- Family: Pyramidellidae
- Genus: Pyramidella
- Species: P. turrita

Binomial name
- Pyramidella turrita A. Adams, 1855

Species of gastropod

Pyramidella turrita is a species of sea snail, a marine gastropod mollusk in the family Pyramidellidae, the pyrams and their allies.

== Description ==
The shell has a fulvous color, obsoletely maculated with a deeper tint. The whorls of the teleoconch are flattened. The suture is deep, crenulated and frequently whitish. The body whorl has a distinct median sulcus. The length of the shell varies between 22 mm and 24 mm.

== Distribution ==
This marine species occurs in the following locations :

- Northern Australia, New Caledonia.
- Indian Ocean off East Africa, and Durban, South Africa.
