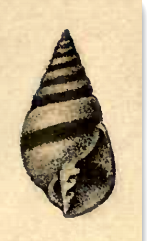
- Drawing of a shell of Milda cincta

Scientific classification
- Kingdom: Animalia
- Phylum: Mollusca
- Class: Gastropoda
- Family: Pyramidellidae
- Genus: Milda
- Species: M. cincta

Binomial name
- Milda cincta (Reeve, 1842)

Synonyms
- Pyramidella cincta Reeve, 1842; Pyramidella (Milda) cincta Reeve, 1842; Pyramidella ventricosa Guérin-Méneville, 1831

= Milda cincta =

Species of gastropod

Milda cincta, common name the banded pyram, is a species of sea snail, a marine gastropod mollusk in the family Pyramidellidae, the pyrams and their allies.

== Description ==
The shell is smooth, white, with a broad central chestnut zone, appearing on the spire whorls. Its length varies between 15 mm and 33 mm. The columella is triplicatewith a narrow perforation.

== Distribution ==
This marine species occurs off Vietnam, the Philippines and Australia.
