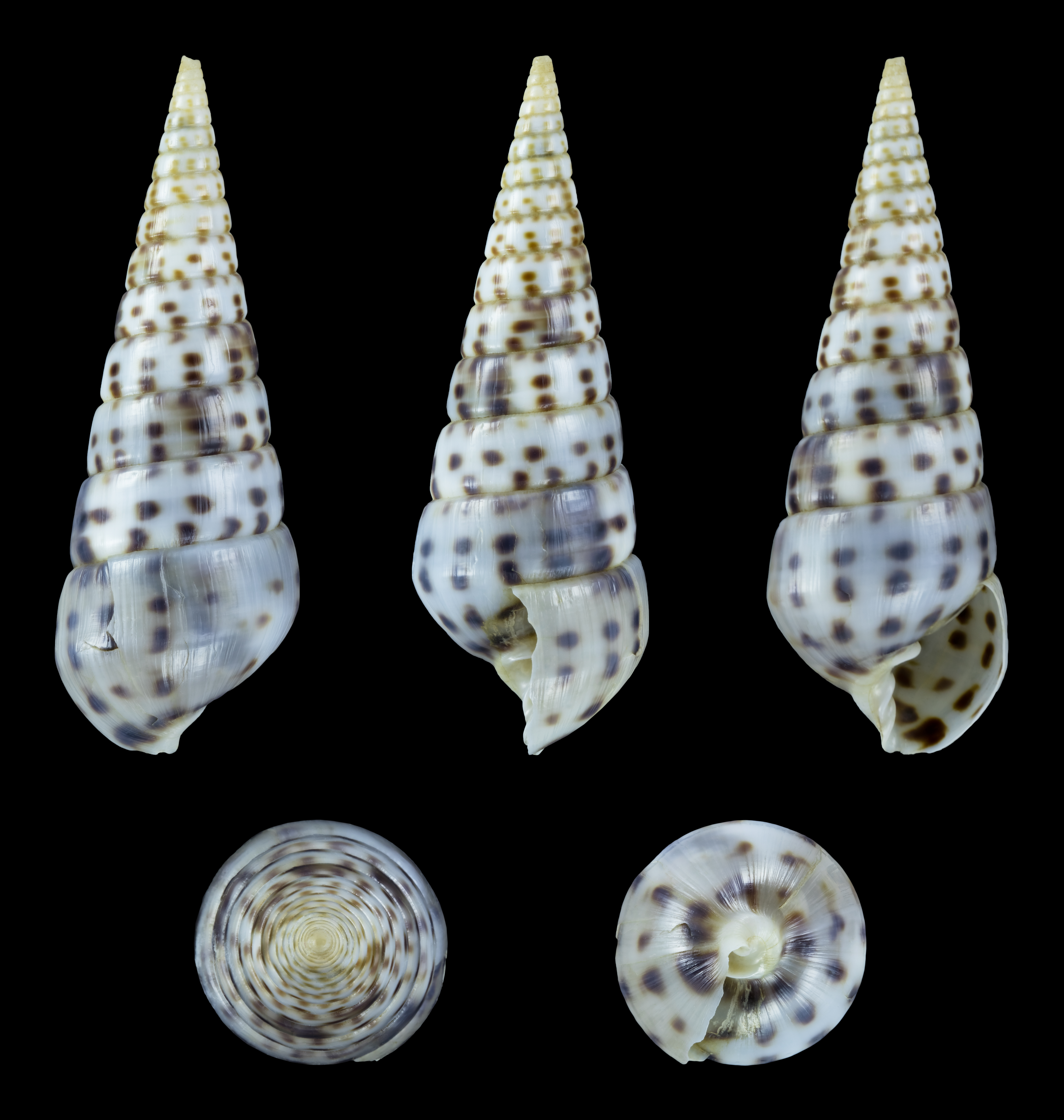
- A shell of Longchaeus acus from Samoa

Scientific classification
- Kingdom: Animalia
- Phylum: Mollusca
- Class: Gastropoda
- Family: Pyramidellidae
- Genus: Longchaeus
- Species: L. acus

Binomial name
- Longchaeus acus (Gmelin, 1791)

Synonyms
- Lonchaeus acus [sic]Gmelin, 1791; Longchaeus punctatus (Férussac, 1821); Pyramidella (Longchaeus) acus (Gmelin, J.F., 1791); Pyramidella acus (Gmelin, 1791); Pyramidella maculosa Lamarck, J.B.P.A. de, 1822; Pyramidella musculosa Lamarck, J.B.P.A. de, 1816; Pyramidella punctata Schubert, H.G. & A.J. Wagner, 1829 (invalid: homonym and synonym of Pyramidella punctata Férussac, 1821); Pyramidella punctata Férussac, 1821; Voluta acus Gmelin, 1791 (original combination); Voluta guttata Link, H.F., 1807

= Longchaeus acus =

Needle pyram

Species of sea snail

Longchaeus acus, common name the needle pyram, is a species of sea snail, a marine gastropod mollusk in the family Pyramidellidae, the pyrams and their allies.

== Description ==
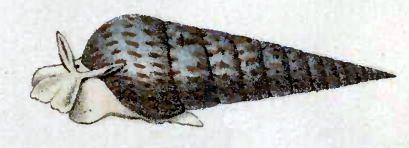
Drawing of Pyramidella acus from Manual of conchology, structural and systematic (1881)

The shell is polished. Its color is white, with dark chestnut or chocolate spots, usually arranged in three revolving series on the whorls of the teleoconch and five series on the body whorl. The whorls are lightly inflated. The columella is three-plaited with the upper plait being the largest. The lip is sometimes lirate within. The peripheral groove becomes in this species either obsolete or indicated by a slight angle. Specimen photos show well impressed sutures. The length of the shell varies between 19 mm and 67 mm.

== Distribution and habitat ==
This marine species occurs in the Indo-West Pacific (Red Sea, Tanzania, Madagascar, Mauritius, Mascarene Basin, off the coast of the northern half of Australia, and in South East Asia, in Vietnam and Philippines). L. acus is a marine benthic snail that resides in waters less than 40 meters below the surface.

== Life habits ==
=== Diet ===
Snails in the family Pyramidellidae are carnivorous and often ectoparasitic, and species in the genus Longchaeus are noted to be browsing carnivores. This family primarily feeds on clams, oysters, polychaetes, and occasionally other species of gastropod.

=== Reproduction ===
This species reproduces sexually.

=== Locomotion ===
L. acus moves by mucus mediated gliding.
