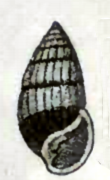
- Drawing of a shell of Otopleura glans

Scientific classification
- Kingdom: Animalia
- Phylum: Mollusca
- Class: Gastropoda
- Family: Pyramidellidae
- Genus: Otopleura
- Species: O. glans

Binomial name
- Otopleura glans (Reeve, 1843)

Synonyms
- Pyramidella (Otopleura) glans Reeve, 1843 (basionym)

= Otopleura glans =

Species of gastropod

Otopleura glans, common name the acorn pyram, is a species of sea snail, a marine gastropod mollusk in the family Pyramidellidae, the pyrams and their allies.

== Description ==
The white shell has a narrow chocolate band above and below the suture. The lower half of the body whorl is chocolate colored. The shell is longitudinally closely ribbed. The interstices are spirally striated. The length of shell varies between 8 mm and 15 mm.

== Distribution ==
This marine species occurs off Vietnam and the Philippines.
