= Kleinella ceylanica =

Scientific classification
- Kingdom: Animalia
- Phylum: Mollusca
- Class: Gastropoda
- Family: Pyramidellidae
- Genus: Kleinella
- Species: K. ceylanica

Binomial name
- Kleinella ceylanica (Preston, 1905)

Species of gastropod

Kleinella ceylanica is a species of sea snail, a marine gastropod mollusk in the family Pyramidellidae, the pyrams and their allies.
