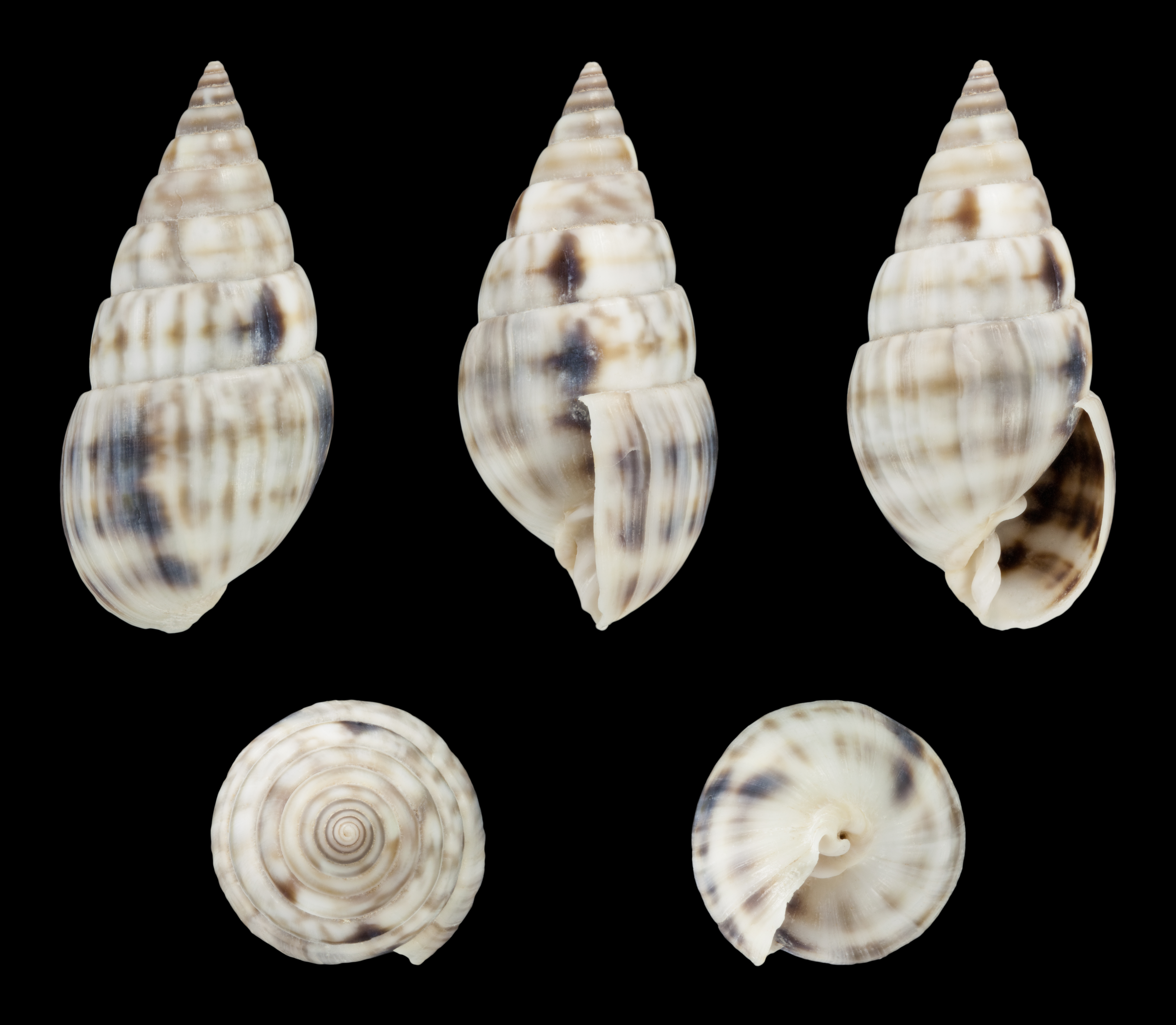
- A shell of Milda ventricosa

Scientific classification
- Domain: Eukaryota
- Kingdom: Animalia
- Phylum: Mollusca
- Class: Gastropoda
- Family: Pyramidellidae
- Genus: Milda
- Species: M. ventricosa

Binomial name
- Milda ventricosa (Guérin, 1831)

Synonyms
- Obeliscus scitulus Adams, A. 1853; Obeliscus ventricosus (Guérin, 1831); Pyramidella ventricosa Guérin, 1831

= Milda ventricosa =

Species of gastropod

Milda ventricosa, common name the ventricose pyram, is a species of small to medium-sized sea snail, a marine gastropod mollusk in the (mostly minute) family Pyramidellidae, the pyram snails.

== Distribution ==
This species is found in the western and central tropical Indo-West Pacific; also off Japan and Australia (Northern Territory, Queensland)

== Description ==
The length of the shell varies between 15 mm and 33 mm.

The shell is ovate, turreted, polished, pointed at its summit, indistinctly striated in its whole length. The spire is composed of ten slightly convex whorls. The withish body whorl is a little swollen. All the whorls are adorned with longitudinal, undulated, reddish, or brown lines, quite near together. Wide, brown spots often partially cover them, a line equally brown passes over each whorl. Upon the body whorl are found three others, which sometimes form quite large bands of the same color. The sutures are slightly canaliculated. The ovate aperture is whitish, marked likewise, with a few brown lines towards the depth of the cavity, exhibiting pretty distinct furrows. The outer lip is thin, terminated below by a small siphonal canal, at its union with the columella. The columella is slightly arcuated, with three folds at its base, the first very prominent. The umbilicus is indistinctly marked. From the base juts out a round fold, which is seen to turn in a spiral manner in the umbilicus. The ovate operculum is membranous, its laminae not spiral, having one or two notches to receive the folds of the columella.
