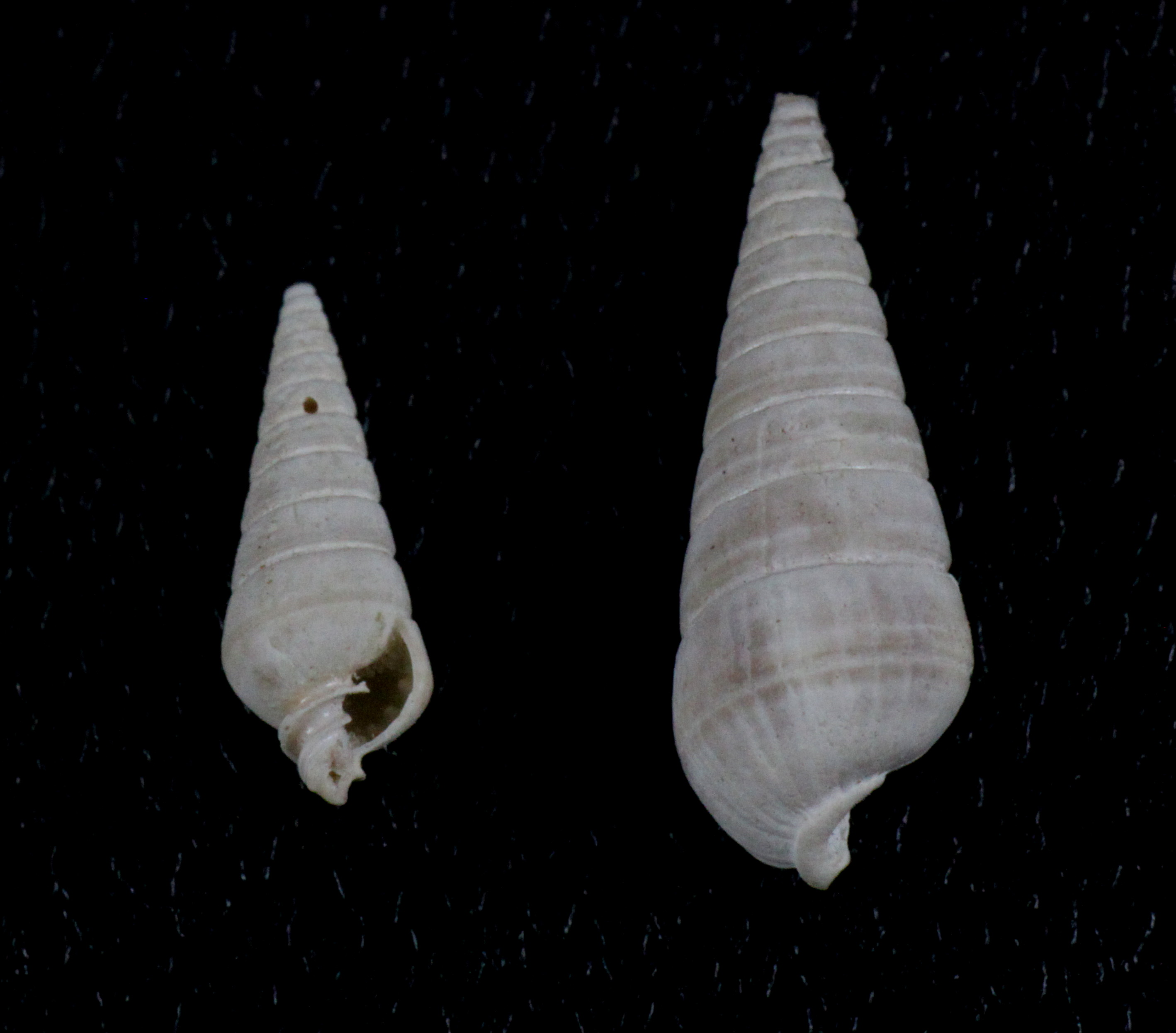

Scientific classification
- Kingdom: Animalia
- Phylum: Mollusca
- Class: Gastropoda
- Family: Pyramidellidae
- Genus: Longchaeus
- Species: L. suturalis

Binomial name
- Longchaeus suturalis (H. C. Lea, 1843)

Synonyms
- Pyramidella crenulata (Holmes, 1859); Pyramidella suturalis Lea, H.C., 1846 (basionym)

= Longchaeus suturalis =

Crenulated pyram

Species of gastropod

== Description ==
Longchaeus suturalis, more commonly called Crenulated pyrams are a type of parasitic sea snail that specialize in sucking the body juices and blood from other marine organisms. They are on average 12 mm (0.5 inches) The shell is smooth and conical.

== Distribution ==
This species occurs in the following locations:

- Gulf of Mexico (Virgin Islands)
- the Caribbean Sea off Venezuela and Colombia
- the Atlantic Ocean off North Carolina
