= Tiberia minuscula =

Scientific classification
- Kingdom: Animalia
- Phylum: Mollusca
- Class: Gastropoda
- Family: Pyramidellidae
- Genus: Tiberia
- Species: T. minuscula

Binomial name
- Tiberia minuscula (Monterosato, 1880)

Synonyms
- Pyramidella laeviuscula Jeffreys, J.G., 1870; Pyramidella minuscula Monterosato, 1880 (nomen nudum); Pyramidella nitidula Jeffreys, J.G., 1884; Pyramidella octaviana Di Geronimo, 1973; Tiberia octaviana Di Geronimo, 1973

Species of gastropod

Tiberia minuscula is a species of small sea snail, a marine gastropod mollusk in the family Pyramidellidae, the pyrams and their allies.

== Description ==
The length of the shell varies between 4.5 mm and 6 mm.

== Distribution ==
This marine species occurs in the following locations:

- European waters (ERMS scope)
- Mediterranean Sea : Greece, Morocco
- Portuguese Exclusive Economic Zone
- Spanish Exclusive Economic Zone: Canary Islands
- Cape Verde
