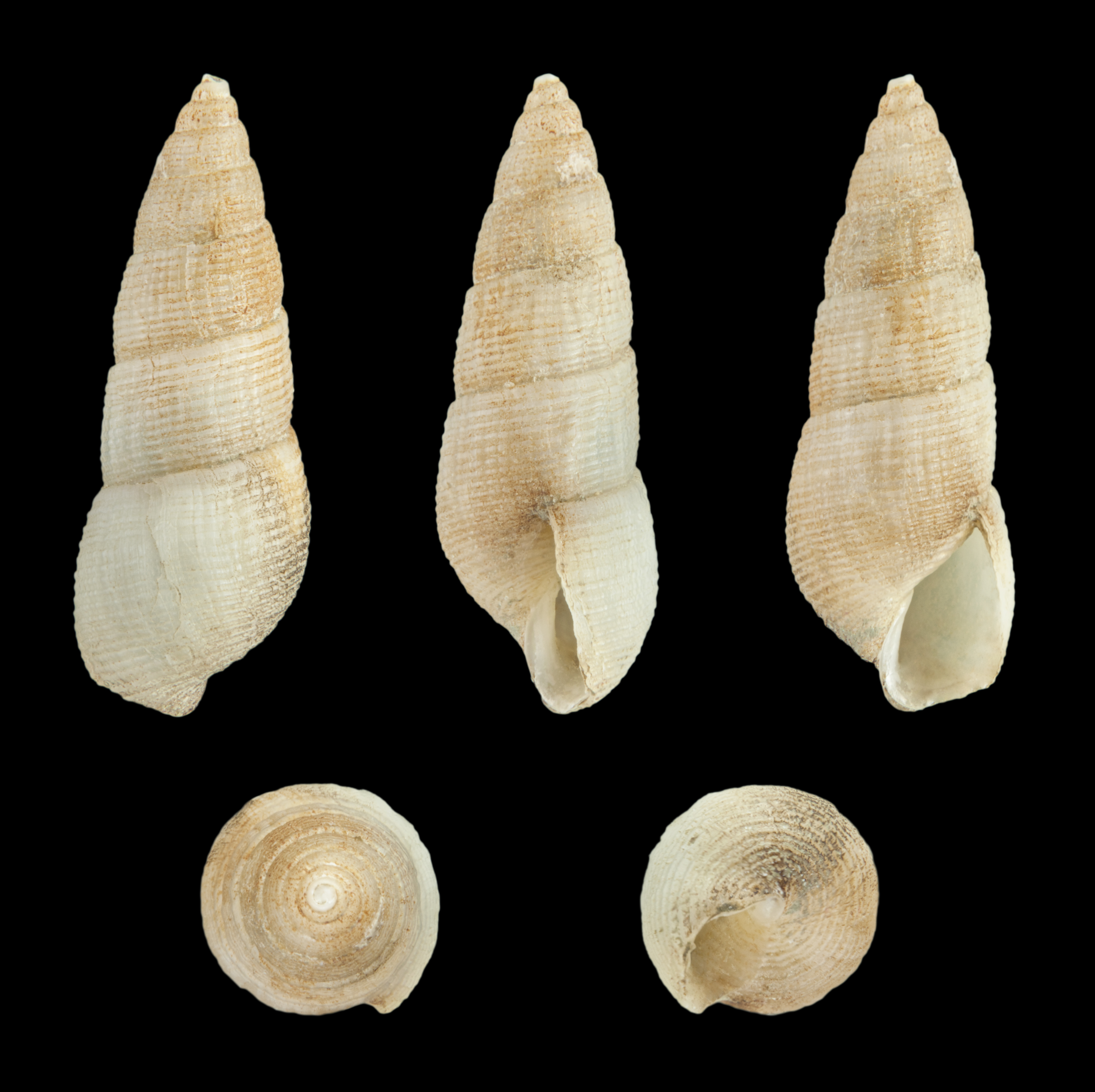
- Shell of Euparthenia bulinea

Scientific classification
- Kingdom: Animalia
- Phylum: Mollusca
- Class: Gastropoda
- Superfamily: Pyramidelloidea
- Family: Pyramidellidae
- Genus: Euparthenia
- Species: E. bulinea

Binomial name
- Euparthenia bulinea (Lowe, 1841)

Synonyms
- Actaeopyramis bulinea (R. T. Lowe, 1841); Actaeopyramis bulinea var. tenuis Pallary, 1904; Chemnitzia humboldti var. gracilis R. A. Philippi, 1844 junior subjective synonym; Littorina striata Danilo & Sandri, 1856; Odostomia dissimilis Tiberi, 1868 ·; Parthenia bulinea Lowe, 1841; Pyramidella aprustica Crema, 1903(dubious synonym); † Tornatella elongata R. A. Philippi, 1837

= Euparthenia bulinea =

Species of gastropod

Euparthenia bulinea is a species of sea snail, a marine gastropod mollusk in the family Pyramidellidae, the pyrams and their allies.

== Distribution ==
This species occurs in the following locations:

- European waters (ERMS scope)
- Greek Exclusive Economic Zone
