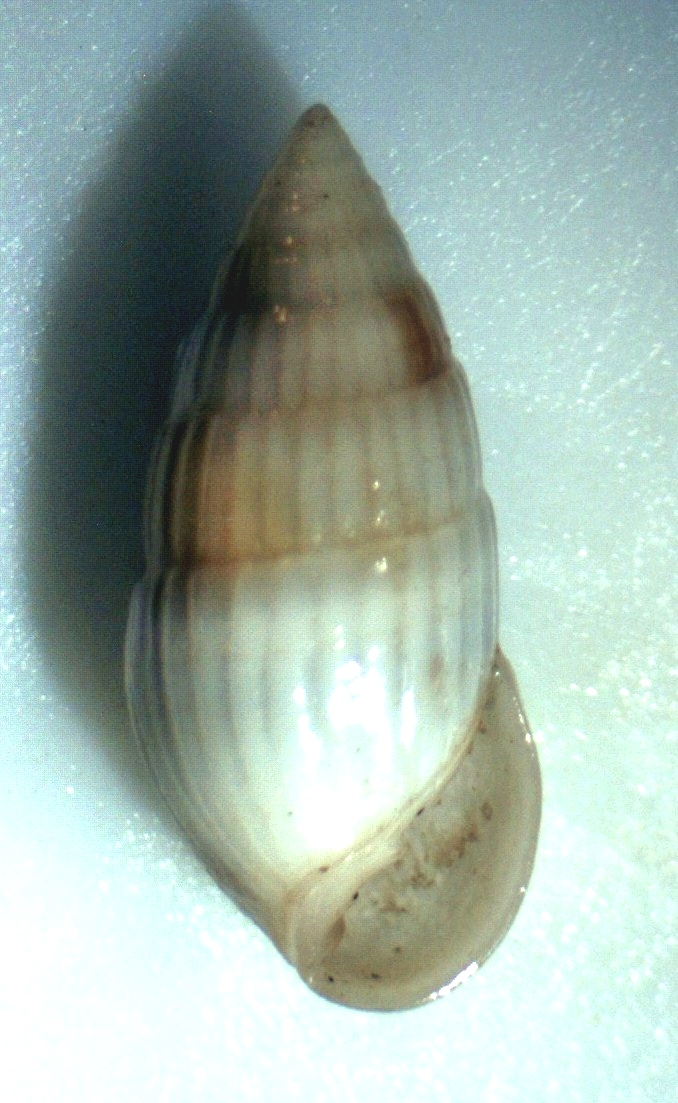
- Apertural view of a shell of Otopleura nitida

Scientific classification
- Kingdom: Animalia
- Phylum: Mollusca
- Class: Gastropoda
- Family: Pyramidellidae
- Genus: Otopleura
- Species: O. nitida

Binomial name
- Otopleura nitida (A. Adams, 1855)

Synonyms
- Pyramidella (Otopleura) nitida A. Adams, 1855 (basionym)

= Otopleura nitida =

Species of gastropod

Otopleura nitida is a species of sea snail, a marine gastropod mollusk in the family Pyramidellidae, the pyrams and their allies.

== Description ==
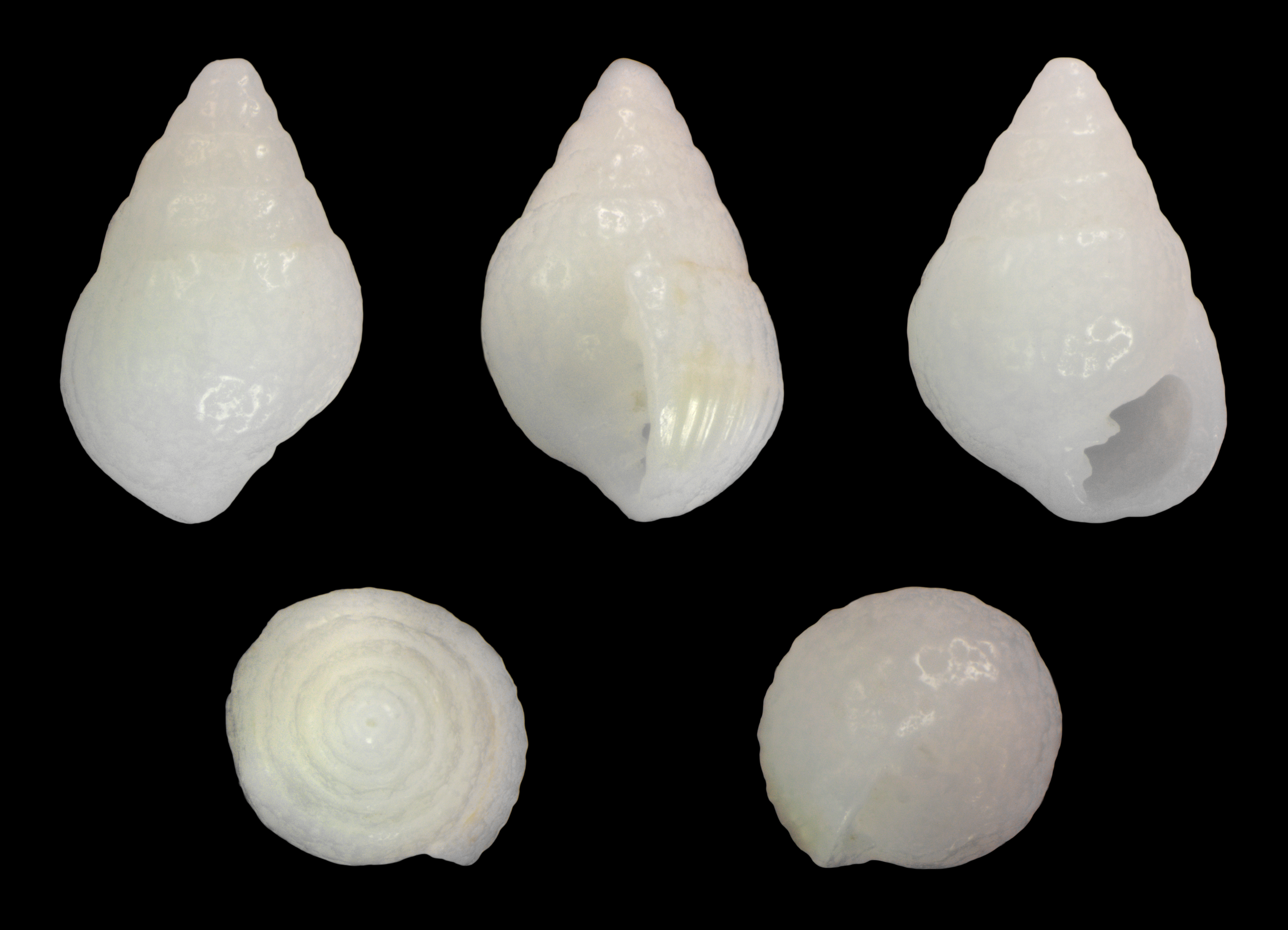
Juvenile

The oval shell is shining, white, sometimes marbled with pale chestnut. The sculpture is longitudinally flatly ribbed. The interstices are pitted. The length varies between 7.5 mm and 13 mm.

== Distribution ==
This marine species occurs off La Réunion, the Philippines, French Polynesia, Japan and in the South China Sea.
