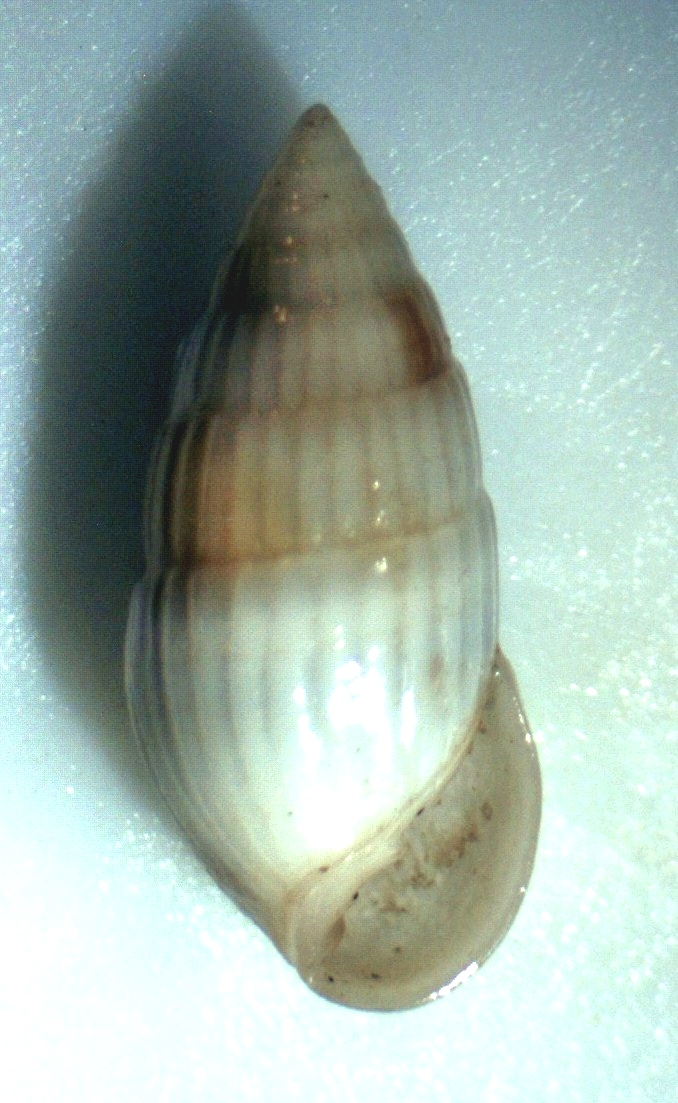
- Otopleura nitida

Scientific classification
- Kingdom: Animalia
- Phylum: Mollusca
- Class: Gastropoda
- Subcohort: Panpulmonata
- Superfamily: Pyramidelloidea
- Family: Pyramidellidae
- Genus: Otopleura; P. Fischer, 1885

Type species
- Voluta auriscati Holten, H.S., 1802

Synonyms
- Aphalista Laseron, 1959

= Otopleura =

Genus of sea snails

Otopleura is a genus of minute to medium-sized sea snails, marine gastropod mollusk in the family Pyramidellidae, the pyrams and their allies.

== Species ==
Species within the genus Otopleura include:

- Otopleura auriscati (Holten, 1802)
- Otopleura glans (Reeve, 1843)
- Otopleura mitralis (A. Adams, 1855)
- Otopleura nitida (A. Adams in H. & A. Adams, 1853–58)
- Otopleura nodicincta (A. Adams, 1855)

Species brought into synonymy

- Otopleura australis Laseron, 1959: synonym of Otopleura mitralis (A. Adams, 1854)

== Distribution ==
Species of this genus can be found throughout the Pacific Ocean.
