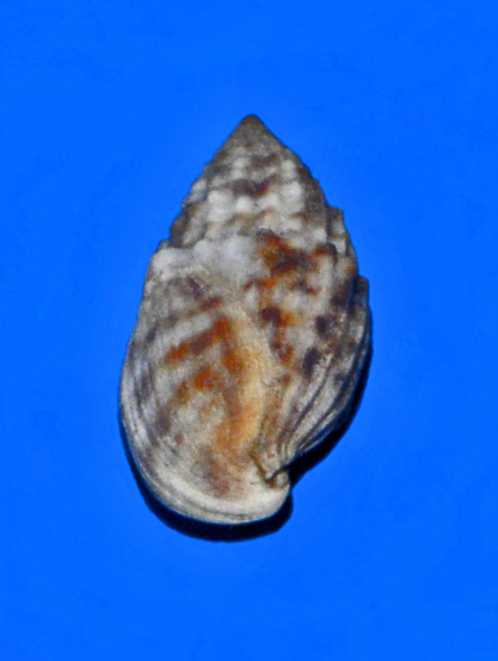
- A shell of Otopleura auriscati from Philippines, on display at the Museo Civico di Storia Naturale di Milano

Scientific classification
- Kingdom: Animalia
- Phylum: Mollusca
- Class: Gastropoda
- Family: Pyramidellidae
- Genus: Otopleura
- Species: O. auriscati

Binomial name
- Otopleura auriscati (Holten, 1802)

Synonyms
- Pyramidella auriscati Holten, 1802; Pyramidella magnifica Adams & Reeve, 1850; Pyramidella plicata Lamarck, J.B.P.A. de, 1816; Pyramidella spiralis Wood; Voluta auriscati Holten, 1802 (original combination)

= Otopleura auriscati =

Cat's ear pyram

Species of gastropod

Otopleura auriscati, common name the cat's ear pyram, is a species of sea snail, a marine gastropod mollusk in the family Pyramidellidae, the pyrams and their allies.

== Description ==
The length of the shell varies between 10 mm and 30 mm.

The smooth, white, solid shell has an ovate, elongated shape. The pointed spire is composed of ten or eleven slightly convex whorls, distinct and separated by a narrow scaffolding accompanying the suture, which is somewhat undulated. The body whorl is almost as large as all the others together. All whorls are longitudinally ribbed, extremely regular, often terminated at their summit by a small tubercle at the sutures. The shell has spiral rows of chestnut spots. The interstices of the ribs are spirally striated with fine transverse striae.

The coloring of this shell is whitish. The shell is ornamented with reddish spots arranged in transverse series, almost always united, and forming three bands upon the upper whorls, and five upon the body whorl. Upon this is often seen also, a large brown and irregular blotch. The aperture ovate, elongated, narrow, and slightly oblique. The outer lip is thick, white, forming a little gutter at the base. The columella is imperforate at its lower extremity, oblique, bearing three unequal folds. The first is more prominent, is horizontal, thin, and sharp; the two others are oblique and smaller.

== Distribution ==
This species occurs in the following locations:

- Red Sea
- Madagascar, Mauritius
- Indonesia, the Philippines
- Australia (Northern Territory, Queensland, Western Australia)
- Japan

== General references ==
- Adams, A. 1854. Monographs of the genera Eulima, Niso, Leiostraca, Obeliscus, Pyramidella and Monoptygma. pp. 793–825 in Sowerby, G.B. (ed.). Thesaurus Conchyliorum or monographs of genera of shells. London : Sowerby Vol. 2 pp. 439–899.
- Adams, A. 1854. Monographs of the genera Eulima, Niso, Leiostraca, Obeliscus, Pyramidella and Monoptygma. pp. 793–825 in Sowerby, G.B. (ed.). Thesaurus Conchyliorum or monographs of genera of shells. London : Sowerby Vol. 2 pp. 439–899.
- Reeve, L.A. 1865. Monograph of the genus Pyramidella. pls 1-6 in Reeve, L.A. (ed). Conchologia Iconica. London : L. Reeve & Co. Vol. 15.
- Tryon, G.W. 1886. Manual of Conchology, structural and systematic: with illustrations of the species. Series 2 Philadelphia : Published by the author Vol. 8 pp. 461, pls 79.
- Clessin, S 1902. Die Familie der Eulimidae. Systematisches Conchylien-Cabinet von Martini und Chemnitz 1(28): 1-273, pls 1-41
- Dall, W.H. & Bartsch, P. 1904. Synopsis of the genera, subgenera and sections of the family Pyramidellidae. Proceedings of the Biological Society of Washington 17: 1-16
- Schepman, M.M. 1909. The Prosobranchia of the Siboga Expedition. Part 3 Gymnoglossa. pp. 234–245 in Weber, M. (ed.). Siboga-Expedite. Leiden : Brill Vol. 48.
- Hedley, C. 1910. The marine fauna of Queensland. Australasian Association for the Advancement of Science 12: 329-371
- Allan, J.K. 1950. Australian Shells: with related animals living in the sea, in freshwater and on the land. Melbourne : Georgian House xix, 470 pp., 45 pls, 112 text figs.
- Laseron, C. 1959. The family Pyramidellidae (Mollusca) from northern Australia. Australian Journal of Marine and Freshwater Research 10: 177-267, figs 1-213
- Saurin, E. 1959. Pyramidellidae de Nha-Trang (Viet-Nam). Annales de la Faculté des Sciences, Saigon (1959): 223-283, pls 1-9
- Rippingale, O.H. & McMichael, D.F. 1961. Queensland and Great Barrier Reef Shells. Brisbane : Jacaranda Press 210 pp.
- Cernohorsky, W.O. 1972. Marine Shells of the Pacific. Sydney : Pacific Publications Vol. 2 411 pp., 68 pls.
- Tantanasiriwong, R. 1978. An illustrated checklist of marine shelled gastropods from Phuket Island, adjacent mainland and offshore islands, Western Peninsula, Thailand. Phuket Marine Biological Center, Research Bulletin 21: 1-22, 259 figs
- Coleman, N. 1981. What shell is that? Sydney : Lansdowne Press, Sydney 308 pp.
- Springsteen, F.J. & Leobrera, F.M. 1986. Shells of the Philippines. Manila : Carfel Seashell Museum 377 pp., 100 pls.
- Short, J.W. & Potter, D.G. 1987. Shells of Queensland and The Great Barrier Reef. Drummoyne, NSW : Golden press Pty Ltd 135 pp., 60 pl.
- Wells, F.F., Bryce, C.W., Clark, J.E. & Hansen, G.M. 1990. Christmas Shells. The marine molluscs of Christmas Island (Indian Ocean). Christmas Island: Australia : Christmas Island Natural History Association 98 pp., pls 1-81.
- Okutani, T. 2000. Marine mollusks in Japan. Tokai University Press 1173 pp.
- Willan, R.C. 2005. The molluscan fauna from the emergent reefs of the northernmost Sahul Shelf, Timor Sea — Ashmore, Cartier and Hibernia Reefs; biodiversity and zoogeography. pp. 51–81 in Russell, B.C. et al. (eds). Understanding the Cultural and Natural Heritage values and Management Challenges of the Ashmore Region. The Beagle, Records of the Museums and Art Galleries of the Northern Territory Suppl. 1: 248 pp.
- Biodiversity Heritage Library (1 publication)
- Encyclopedia of Life
- World Register of Marine Species
- "Otopleura auriscati". Gastropods.com.
