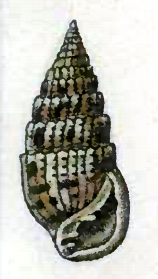
- Drawing of a shell of Otopleura mitralis

Scientific classification
- Kingdom: Animalia
- Phylum: Mollusca
- Class: Gastropoda
- Family: Pyramidellidae
- Genus: Otopleura
- Species: O. mitralis

Binomial name
- Otopleura mitralis (A. Adams, 1855)

Synonyms
- Odostomia (Egila) australis Laseron, C.F., 1959; Otopleura australis Laseron, 1959; Pyramidella mitralis A. Adams, 1855; Pyramidella propinqua Adams, A. in Adams, H.G. & A. Adams, 1853; Pyramidella variegata A. Adams, 1854

= Otopleura mitralis =

Species of gastropod

Otopleura mitralis, common name the miter pyram, is a species of sea snail, a marine gastropod mollusk in the family Pyramidellidae, the pyrams and their allies.

== Description ==
The whitish shell has a clouded appearance, indistinctly banded with pale brown. The whorls of the teleoconch are rather convex, longitudinally ribbed, slightly angulated at the suture. The interstices are spirally striated. The length of the shell varies between 10 mm and 20 mm.

== Distribution ==
This marine species occurs in the following locations:

- Red Sea, Persian Gulf
- Indian Ocean : Aldabra, Mauritius, Madagascar
- Pacific Ocean : Hawaii, Guam, French Polynesia, Tahiti, New Caledonia, New Zealand, Northern Australia

== Notes ==
Additional information regarding this species:

- Remark: Also as subgenus Pyramidella in Vine,1986 .
