= Euparthenia =

Scientific classification
- Kingdom: Animalia
- Phylum: Mollusca
- Class: Gastropoda
- Family: Pyramidellidae
- Genus: Euparthenia; Thiele, 1929

Type species
- Parthenia bulinea R. T. Lowe, 1841

Synonyms
- Parthenia Lowe, 1841 (non Robineau-Desvoidy, 1830)

Genus of gastropods

Euparthenia is a genus of very small sea snails, pyramidellid gastropod molluscs, or micromolluscs in the subfamily Turbonillinae.

The name Euparthenia is a replacement name for Parthenia Lowe, 1841 not Robineau-Desvoidy, 1830.

The genus Euparthenia contains both recent and fossil species.

== Shell description ==
The original description by Johannes Thiele (in English translation) is as follows: "Shell non-umbilicate, moderately turriculate, with spiral rings and ribs; columellar fold distinct. Kleinella (E.) bulinea (Lowe). A couple of species in the Mediterranean Sea and Atlantic Ocean."

The description of the type species by Richard Thomas Lowe (1841) reads:

"PARTHENIA BULINEA. P. testa subcylindaceo-attenuata, oblongiscula, juniore ovato-tereti: anfractibus planis, elegantissime reticulato-cancellatis, striis spiralibus crebris aequidistantibus, transversas aequidistantes decussantibus; sutura distincta impressa: columella postice torta, uniplicata. a. subventricosa."

== Life habits ==
Little is known about the biology of the members of this genus. As is true of most members of the Pyramidellidae sensu lato, they are most likely to be ectoparasites.

== Species ==
Species within the genus Euparthenia include:

- Euparthenia bulinea (Lowe, 1841) - type species, as Parthenia bulinea
- Euparthenia elegans
- Euparthenia humboldti (Risso, 1926)
- Euparthenia nordmanni Sorgenfrei, 1958
