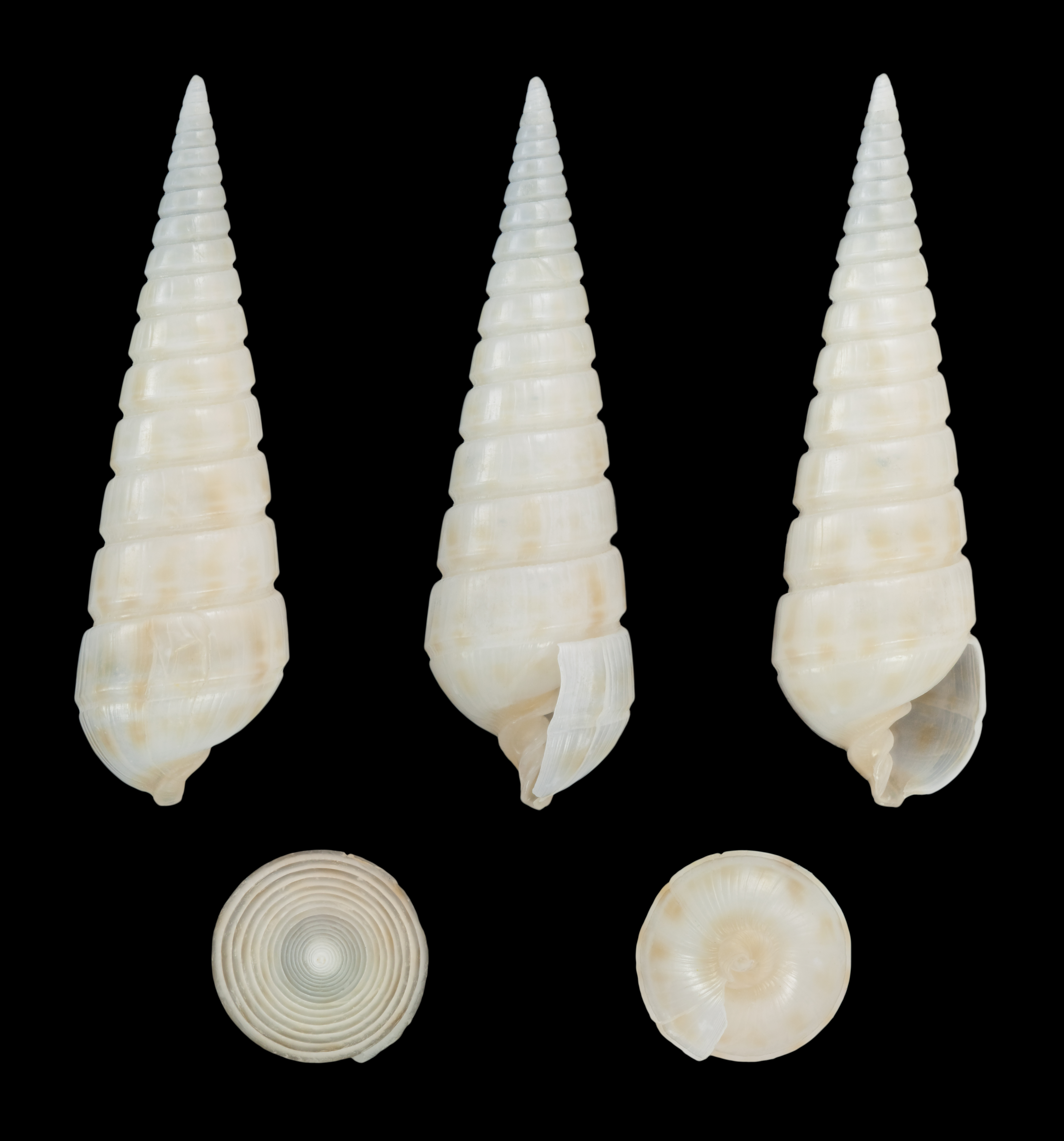
- A shell of Longchaeus turritus

Scientific classification
- Kingdom: Animalia
- Phylum: Mollusca
- Class: Gastropoda
- Family: Pyramidellidae
- Genus: Longchaeus
- Species: L. turritus

Binomial name
- Longchaeus turritus (A. Adams, 1854)

Synonyms
- Elusa teres Adams, 1861; Lonchaeus prattii Bernardi; Obeliscus teres A. Adams, 1854; Obeliscus turritus A. Adams, 1854 (original combination); Pyramidella pratii Bernardi, 1858; Pyramidella teres (A. Adams, 1854); Tropaeas teres (A. Adams, 1854)

= Longchaeus turritus =

Species of gastropod

Longchaeus turritus is a species of sea snail, a marine gastropod mollusk in the family Pyramidellidae, the pyrams and their allies.

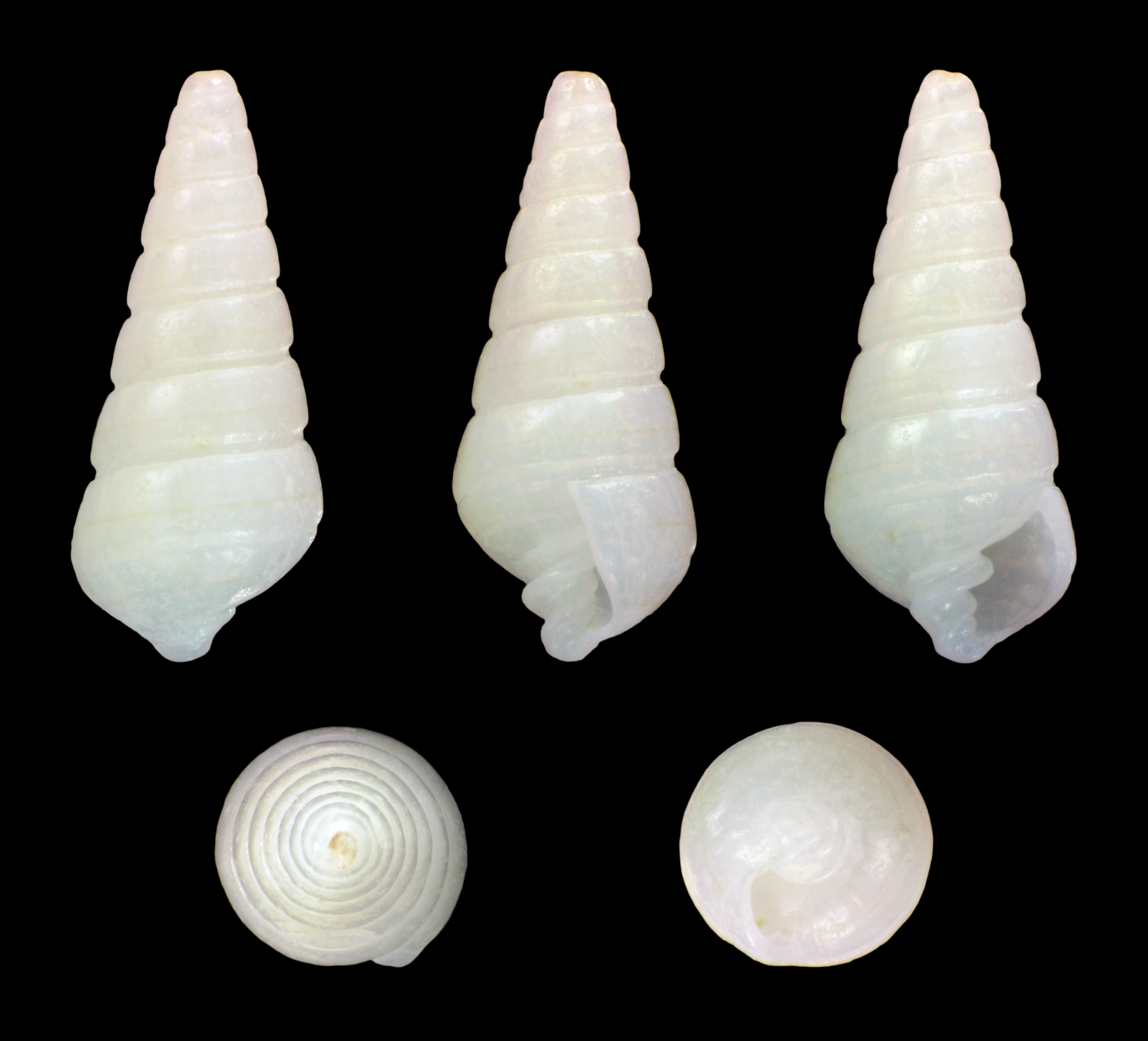
Juvenile

== Distribution ==
This marine species occurs in the following locations:

- Madagascar
- Tanzania
