= Milda garretti =

- Drawing of a shell of Milda garretti

Scientific classification
- Kingdom: Animalia
- Phylum: Mollusca
- Class: Gastropoda
- Family: Pyramidellidae
- Genus: Milda
- Species: M. garretti

Binomial name
- Milda garretti (Tryon, 1886)

Synonyms
- Pyramidella garrettii Tryon, 1886; Pyramidella (Milda) garretti (Tryon, 1886)

Species of gastropod

Milda garretti is a species of sea snail, a marine gastropod mollusk in the family Pyramidellidae, the pyrams and their allies.

== Description ==
The shell has a yellowish color with chestnut colored nebulous longitudinal striations. The whorls of the teleoconch are flattened. The suture is channeled. The body whorl has a peripheral sulcus. The columella is three-plicate, the upper fold very strong, lower ones approximate and more oblique. The length of the shell varies between 10 mm and 20 mm.

== Distribution ==
This marine species occurs off Thailand, the Philippines and Indonesia.
