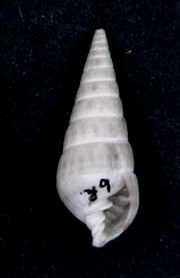
- Apertural view of a shell of Longchaeus maculosus (museum specimen at Naturalis Biodiversity Center)

Scientific classification
- Kingdom: Animalia
- Phylum: Mollusca
- Class: Gastropoda
- Family: Pyramidellidae
- Genus: Longchaeus
- Species: L. maculosus

Binomial name
- Longchaeus maculosus Lamarck, 1822

Synonyms
- Lonchaeus sulcatus A. Adams, 1853; Longchaeus sulcatus (A. Adams, 1854); Obeliscus sulcatus A. Adams, 1854; Obeliscus tessellatus A. Adams, 1854; Pyramidella maculosa Lamarck, 1822; Pyramidella sulcata (A. Adams, 1854); Pyramidella tessellata (A. Adams, 1854)

= Longchaeus maculosus =

Species of sea snail

Longchaeus maculosus, common name the sulcate pyram, is a species of sea snail, a marine gastropod mollusk in the family Pyramidellidae, the pyrams and their allies.

== Description ==
The length of the shell varies between 20 mm and 50 mm.

The grayish white shell is elongated, turreted, brilliant and pointed at its summit. It is slightly widened at its base nebulously longitudinally strigate with pale orange-chestnut, frequently breaking up into revolving series of dots. Its color is sometimes inclining to red, spotted with numerous brown spots arranged in transverse series, three in number upon each whorl, and five upon the body whorl. Upon its surface are seen large, brown, dull, and irregular spots.;Sometimes the points which adorn the shell are united, and form undulating, longitudinal lines. The spire is formed of fifteen or sixteen slightly convex, distinct whorls. The shallow suture is linear. The body whorl is short, and not perforated at the base. The small aperture is subovate, and at its depth are seen indistinct grooves. It is terminated at its base by a small, narrow, and shallow groove. The columella is somewhat arcuated, and presents three unequal folds towards the base.:The first is most projecting, and runs almost horizontally. The two others are small, oblique, and parallel. The outer lip is arcuated, thin, sharp and slightly convex.

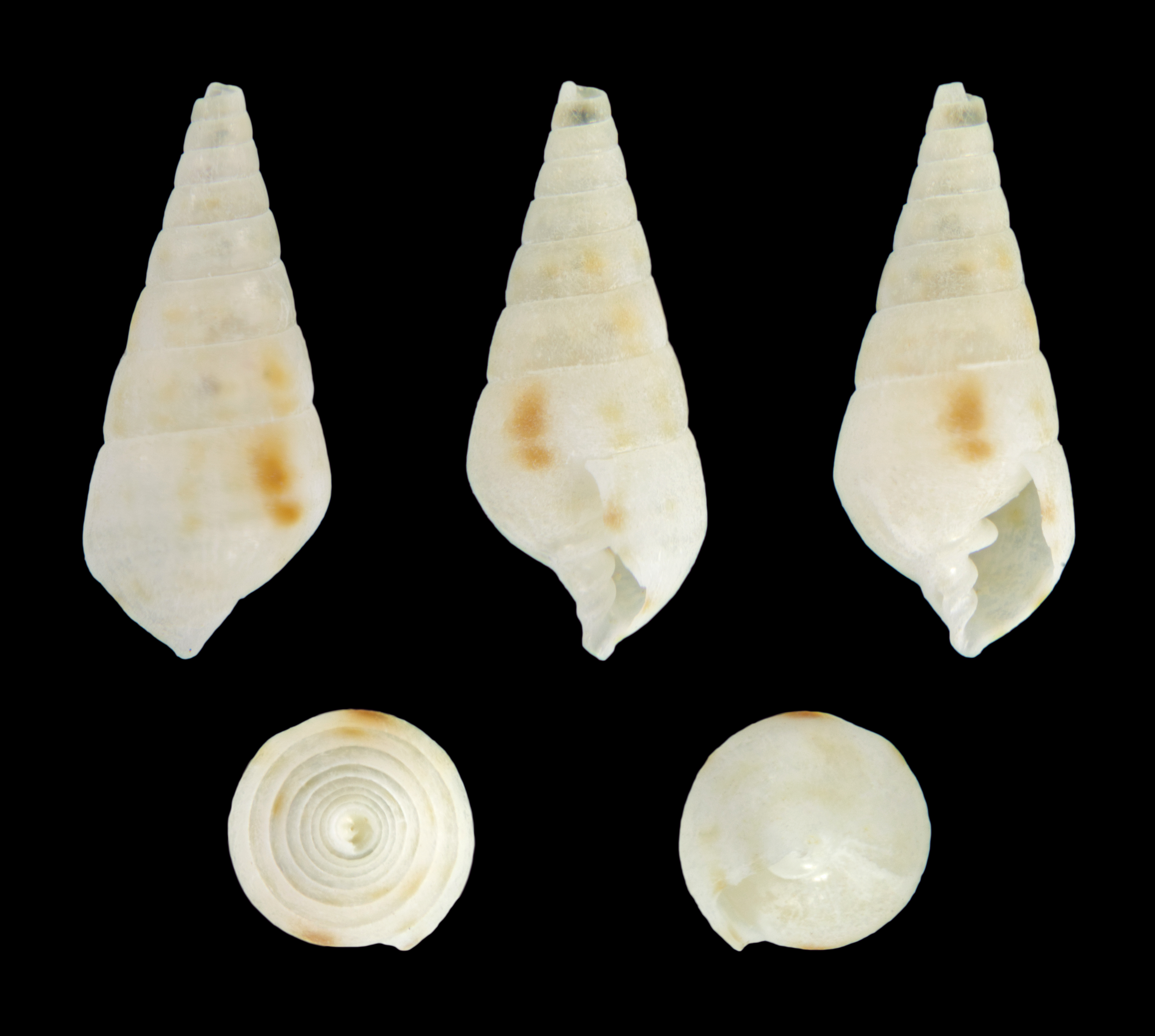
Juvenile

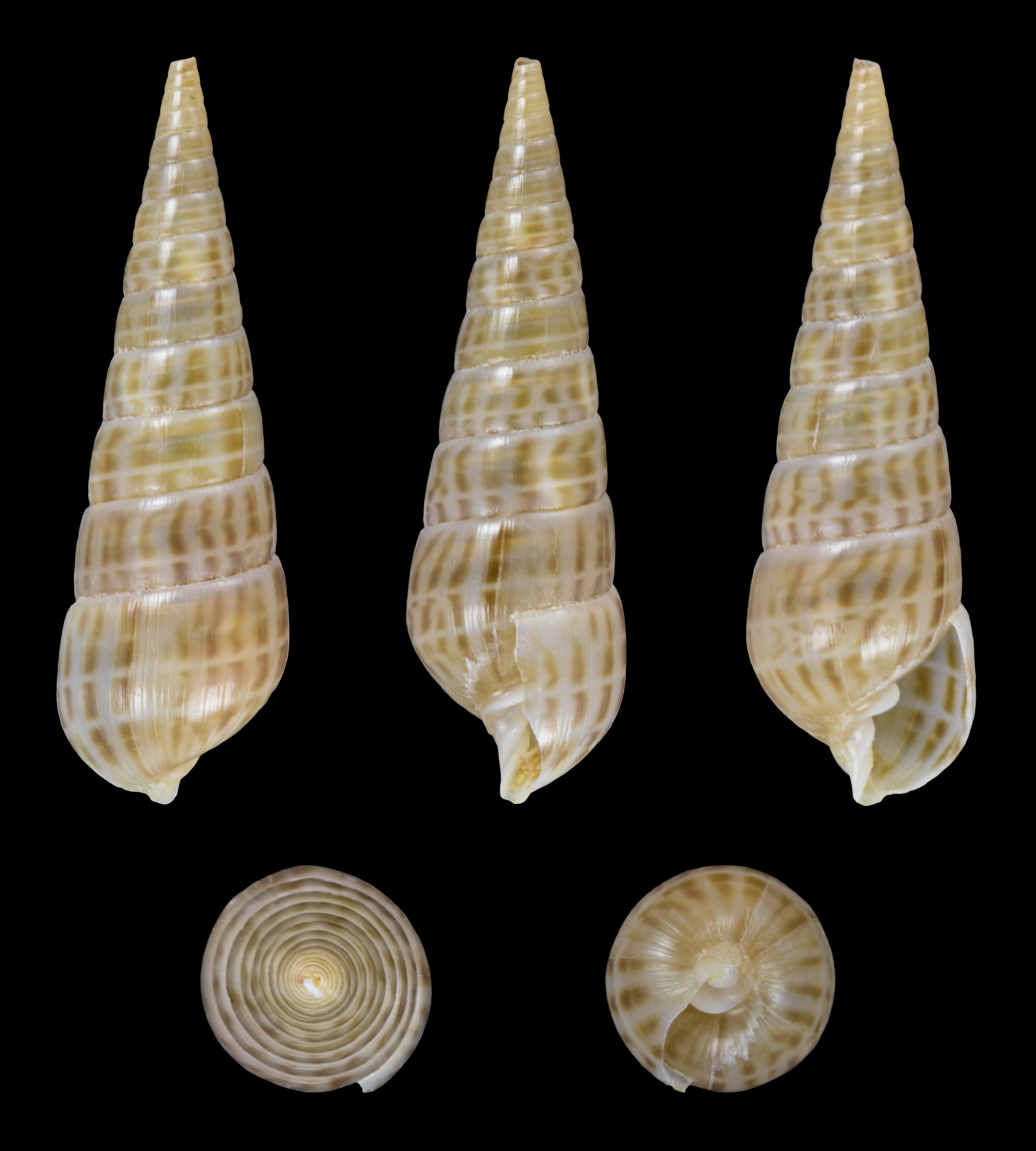
var. tesselatus

Young specimens of this species are very slightly striated, and of a reddish color. Undulating lines and brown spots, distributed here and there, cover the shell. Some specimens are of a still redder color, and the points upon the shell are then more numerous, and of a deeper tint. The length of the shell varies between 18 mm and 50 mm.

== Distribution ==
This marine species occurs in the Red Sea, off New Zealand and in the following locations of the Indian Ocean :

- Aldabra
- Madagascar
- Mascarene Basin
- Tanzania
