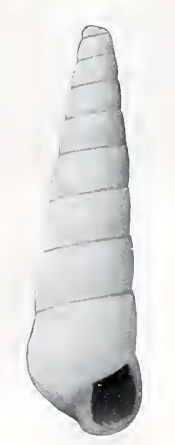
- Drawing of a shell of Syrnola aganea

Scientific classification
- Kingdom: Animalia
- Phylum: Mollusca
- Class: Gastropoda
- Superfamily: Pyramidelloidea
- Family: Pyramidellidae
- Subfamily: Turbonillinae
- Genus: Syrnola; A. Adams, 1860

Type species
- Syrnola gracillima Adams, A., 1860

Synonyms
- Heida Dall, 1903; Obeliscus (Syrnola); Odontostomia (Syrnola) A. Adams, 1860; Odostomia (Heida) Dall, 1903; Pyramidella (Syrnola) A. Adams, 1860; † Syrnola (Loxoptyxis) Cossmann, 1888 · alternate representation; † Syrnola (Pachysyrnola) Cossmann, 1907· alternate representation

= Syrnola =

Genus of gastropods

Syrnola is a genus of sea snails, marine gastropod molluscs in the subfamily Turbonillinae of the family Pyramidellidae, the pyrams and their allies.

== General description ==
The species in Syrnola are medium-sized and slender. Their shell is subulate and polished, marked by fine lines of growth and microscopic spiral striations. It doesn't contain an umbilicus. The whorls of the teleoconch are flattened and increasing regularly in size. The suture is well marked. The aperture is suboval. The outer lip is simple. They possess only one columellar fold.

== Species ==
Species within the genus Syrnola include:

- Syrnola acerrima Watson, 1886
- † Syrnola aclyformis Marwick, 1929
- Syrnola acusbifasciata Peñas & Rolán, 2016
- Syrnola acusgradata Peñas & Rolán, 2016
- Syrnola acutissima Peñas & Rolán, 2016
- Syrnola adamsi (Tryon, 1886)
- Syrnola adventicia Peñas & Rolán, 2016
- Syrnola aganea (Bartsch, 1915)
- Syrnola altapex Peñas & Rolán, 2016
- Syrnola ambagiosa Melvill, 1904
- Syrnola angasi (Tryon, 1886)
- † Syrnola angulifera (Laws, 1937)
- Syrnola angusta Laseron, 1951 (accepted > unreplaced junior homonym, secondary homonym of Syrnola angusta (Deshayes, 1861))
- Syrnola aperanta Melvill, 1906
- Syrnola apollinis Thiele, 1925
- Syrnola arae Peñas & Rolán, 2002
- Syrnola arcta (Deshayes, 1861) †
- Syrnola arundo Peñas & Rolán, 2016
- Syrnola attenuata (Dall, 1892)
- Syrnola aurantiaca Angas, 1867
- Syrnola azona Nomura, 1937
- Syrnola baygiongina Saurin, 1959
- Syrnola bifasciata Tenison-Woods, 1875
- Syrnola bizonalis A. Adams, 1860
- Syrnola cani Saurin, 1959
- Syrnola capensis (G.B. Sowerby III, 1892)
- † Syrnola carinulata Cossmann, 1888
- Syrnola celestae Saurin, 1959
- Syrnola cinctella (Adams A., 1860)
- Syrnola clavellosa Melvill, 1906
- Syrnola clearete Melvill, 1910
- † Syrnola climacina Cossmann, 1888
- † Syrnola cloczi Cossmann, 1896
- Syrnola collea (Bartsch, 1926)
- Syrnola columnella A. Adams, 1863
- † Syrnola concinna (Sorgenfrei, 1958)
- † Syrnola conulus Cossmann, 1888
- Syrnola convexa Laseron, 1951
- Syrnola convoluta (Watson, 1886)
- Syrnola crawfordi Powell, 1927
- Syrnola crocata (A. Adams, 1865)
- Syrnola cuspidata (Garrett, 1873)
- Syrnola cylindrella A. Adams, 1863
- Syrnola daedala A. Adams, 1863
- Syrnola densestriata (Garrett, 1873)
- Syrnola dianae Thiele, 1925
- Syrnola dissociata Peñas & Rolán, 2016
- Syrnola elegans (A. Adams, 1854)
- Syrnola endolamellata (Schander, 1994)
- Syrnola erecta Peñas & Rolán, 2016
- Syrnola eruca Laseron, 1959
- Syrnola etiennei (Dautzenberg, 1912)
- Syrnola exploratorum Peñas & Rolán, 2016
- Syrnola exserta Laseron, 1959
- Syrnola exsulcata Peñas & Rolán, 2016
- Syrnola fasciata Jickeli, 1882
- Syrnola fernandina (Bartsch, 1927)
- Syrnola filiformis Peñas & Rolán, 2016
- Syrnola finitima Peñas & Rolán, 2016
- Syrnola floridana (Bartsch, 1927)
- Syrnola georgiana (Bartsch, 1927)
- Syrnola gigantea Peñas & Rolán, 2016
- † Syrnola goniophora Cossmann, 1888
- Syrnola gracillima A. Adams, 1860
- Syrnola hanzawai Nomura, 1939
- Syrnola hasimotoi Nomura, 1937
- Syrnola hera (Bartsch, 1915)
- † Syrnola houdasi Cossmann, 1907
- Syrnola interpressa Peñas & Rolán, 2016
- Syrnola intraliciata Peñas & Rolán, 2016
- Syrnola irregularis Peñas & Rolán, 2016
- † Syrnola irrevocata Laws, 1937
- Syrnola jacksonensis Laseron, 1951
- Syrnola jovis Thiele, 1925
- Syrnola junonis Thiele, 1925
- Syrnola karachiensis Melvill, 1897
- Syrnola kesenensis Nomura, 1938
- Syrnola lactea A. Adams, 1863
- Syrnola lamothei (Dautzenberg, 1912)
- Syrnola lanassae Hornung & Mermod, 1924
- Syrnola lanceata Peñas, Rolán & Swinnen, 2014
- Syrnola lata Laseron, 1951
- Syrnola lendix (Adams, 1863)
- Syrnla lepidula A. Adams, 1860
- Syrnola longiaperturata Nomura, 1938
- Syrnola longiuscula Peñas & Rolán, 2016
- † Syrnola lutosa Marwick, 1931
- Syrnola macella Saurin, 1962
- Syrnola macrocephala Hedley, 1903
- Syrnola magnusdens Peñas & Rolán, 2016
- Syrnola manifesta Hedley, 1912
- Syrnola manilensis Boettger, 1896
- Syrnola marquesensis Peñas & Rolán, 2016
- Syrnola massauensis Hornung & Mermod, 1924
- Syrnola mekranica Melvill & Standen, 1901
- Syrnola menda Finlay, 1926
- Syrnola mera A. Adams, 1860
- Syrnola mercurii Thiele, 1925
- Syrnola metria Melvill, 1896
- Syrnola michaeli Tenison-Woods, 1877
- † Syrnola microstoma (Deshayes, 1862)
- Syrnola minervae Thiele, 1925
- Syrnola minusgradata Peñas & Rolán, 2016
- Syrnola minuta Adams H., 1869
- Syrnola modica (G.B. Sowerby II, 1865)
- Syrnola monteiroi Peñas & Rolán, 2016
- Syrnola mussandamica Melvill & Standen, 1903
- Syrnola mutabilis Peñas & Rolán, 2016
- Syrnola neglecta Saurin, 1959
- Syrnola neptuni Thiele, 1925
- † Syrnola neumayri (Koenen, 1882)
- † Syrnola nitida (Melleville, 1843)
- Syrnola obeliscus (Garrett, 1873)
- † Syrnola obesula (Deshayes, 1862)
- Syrnola parda Peñas & Rolán, 2016
- Syrnola pergradata Peñas & Rolán, 2016
- Syrnola pervulgata Peñas & Rolán, 2016
- †Syrnola pissarroi Cossmann, 1902
- Syrnola pistillum A. Adams, 1863
- †Syrnola polygyrata (Deshayes, 1861)
- Syrnola praecostulata Saurin, 1959
- †Syrnola praelonga (Deshayes, 1861)
- Syrnola producta (C. B. Adams, 1840)
- Syrnola proserpinae Thiele, 1925
- Syrnola proxima Peñas & Rolán, 2016
- Syrnola pulchra Brazier, 1877
- Syrnola pumilio (E. A. Smith, 1890)
- Syrnola pupina A. Adams, 1860
- Syrnola pyramidalis A. Adams, 1860
- Syrnola pyrrha (Bartsch, 1915)
- Syrnola quaelibet Saurin, 1959
- † Syrnola riddollsi Maxwell, 1992
- † Syrnola rodata (Laws, 1940)
- Syrnola rubrofasciata Peñas & Rolán, 2016
- Syrnola sansibarica Thiele, 1925
- † Syrnola sculptilis Laws, 1937
- Syrnola simulans Peñas & Rolán, 2016
- Syrnola siogamensis Nomura, 1936
- Syrnola solanderiana Laseron, 1959
- Syrnola solomonensis Peñas & Rolán, 2016
- † Syrnola spiculum (Deshayes, 1861)
- † Syrnola spina (Deshayes, 1824)
- Syrnola spiniformis Peñas & Rolán, 2016
- Syrnola striatula (A. Adams, 1854)
- Syrnola strigulata (A. Adams, 1863)
- Syrnola subcinctella Nomura, 1936
- Syrnola subula Gould, 1861
- Syrnola subuliformis (A. Adams, 1863)
- Syrnola subulina A. Adams, 1863
- † Syrnola sulcifera Laws, 1937
- Syrnola susakiensis Nomura, 1939
- Syrnola sutuproelon Peñas & Rolán, 2016
- Syrnola taeniata (A. Adams, 1863)
- Syrnola take Nomura, 1938
- Syrnola teretiuscula A. Adams, 1860
- † Syrnola thelma Dall 1913
- Syrnola thielei (Dautzenberg, 1912)
- Syrnola thomensis Tomlin & Shackleford, 1915
- Syrnola tincta Angas, 1871
- Syrnola torresiana Laseron, 1959
- Syrnola trivittata Sturany, 1903
- Syrnola tubiformis Peñas & Rolán, 2016
- † Syrnola turoniensis (Glibert, 1949)
- Syrnola unilineata (Garrett, 1873)
- Syrnola vanhareni (van Aartsen, Gittenberger & Goud, 1998)
- Syrnola vanhyningi (Bartsch, 1944)
- Syrnola veneris Thiele, 1925
- Syrnola violacea Melvill & Standen, 1896
- Syrnola vitrea A. Adams, 1860
- Syrnola vulcani Thiele, 1925
- † Syrnola waiauica (Laws, 1937)
- † Syrnola wallacei Marwick, 1929
- Syrnola zona Nomura, 1937

== Synonyms ==
- Syrnola aurantia (Petterd, 1884): synonym of Syrnola aurantiaca (Angas, 1867) (junior synonym)
- Syrnola bacillum Pilsbry, 1901: synonym of Tibersyrnola bacillum (Pilsbry, 1901)
- Syrnola bedoti Hornung & Mermod, 1924: synonym of Megastomia bedoti (Hornung & Mermod, 1924)
- † Syrnola bernayi Cossmann, 1888: synonym of † Cossmannica bernayi (Cossmann, 1888) (superseded combination)
- † Syrnola briarti Cossmann, 1888: synonym of † Odostomia briarti (Cossmann, 1888) (superseded combinati
- Syrnola broti Hornung & Mermod, 1924: synonym of Megastomia broti (Hornung & Mermod, 1924)
- Syrnola brunnea (A. Adams, 1854): synonym of Colsyrnola brunnea (A. Adams, 1854)
- Syrnola callembryon Dautzenberg & Fischer, 1907: synonym of Puposyrnola callembryon (Dautzenberg & H. Fischer, 1907)
- Syrnola canaria (Hedley, 1907): synonym of Megastomia canaria (Hedley, 1907)
- Syrnola candida (de Folin, 1870): synonym of Syrnola etiennei (Dautzenberg, 1912)
- Syrnola cerullii Cossmann, 1916: synonym of Eulimella cerullii (Cossmann, 1916)
- Syrnola charpenteri Hornung & Mermod, 1924: synonym of Marginodostomia charpenteri (Hornung & Mermod, 1924)
- Syrnola cincta Fenaux, 1942: synonym of Tibersyrnola unifasciata (Forbes, 1844)
- Syrnola cinnamomea (A. Adams, 1863): synonym of Tibersyrnola cinnamomea (A. Adams, 1863)
- † Syrnola emarginata Cossmann, 1888: synonym of † Cossmannica emarginata (Cossmann, 1888) (superseded combination)
- † Syrnola finlayi (Laws, 1937): synonym of † Finlayola finlayi Laws, 1937
- Syrnola gestroi Hornung & Mermod, 1924: synonym of Megastomia gestroi (Hornung & Mermod, 1924)
- Syrnola hanagaiensis Nomura, 1938: synonym of Derjuginella rufofasciata (E.A. Smith, 1875)
- Syrnola harrissoni Tate & May 1900: synonym of Koloonella harrissoni (Tate & May 1900) (original combination)
- Syrnola inturbida Yokoyama, 1927: synonym of Puposyrnola inturbida (Yokoyama, 1927) (original combination)
- Syrnola jaculum Melvill & Standen, 1896: synonym of Styloptygma jaculum (Melvill & Standen, 1896)
- Syrnola lacteola (Preston, 1904): synonym of Styloptygma lacteola Preston, 1903
- Syrnola lata Laseron, 1951: synonym of Syrnola aurantiaca (Angas, 1867) (junior synonym)
- † Syrnola lawsi Powell, 1934: synonym of † Tibersyrnola lawsi (Powell, 1934)
- Syrnola lorioli Hornung & Mermod, 1924: synonym of Odostomia lorioli (Hornung & Mermod, 1924)
- Syrnola lurida (Suter, 1908): synonym of Finlayola lurida (Suter, 1908)
- † Syrnola mestayerae Marwick, 1931: synonym of † Eulimella mestayerae (Marwick, 1931) (original combination)
- Syrnola metcalfei (Pritchard & Gatliff, 1900): synonym of Odostomia metcalfei Pritchard & Gatliff, 1900
- Syrnola minor E. A. Smith, 1904: synonym of Pyramidella minor (E. A. Smith, 1904)
- Syrnola mossiana Melvill & Standen, 1895: synonym of Odostomia lutea Garrett, 1873
- Syrnola nitidula A. Adams, 1860: synonym of Tiberia nitidula (A. Adams, 1860)
- † Syrnola otaioensis (Laws, 1937): synonym of † Finlayola otaioensis Laws, 1937
- Syrnola petterdi Tate & May 1900: synonym of Agatha petterdi (Gatliff, 1900) (secondary junior homonym of Syrnola tasmanica (Tenison-Woods, 1877), Odostomia petterdi is a replacement name)
- † Syrnola plicifera Cossmann, 1902: synonym of † Tropaeas plicifera (Cossmann, 1902) (superseded combination)
- † Syrnola pupoides Cossmann, 1888: synonym of † Tropaeas pupoides (Cossmann, 1888) ( superseded combination)
- † Syrnola semiconcava P. Marshall & Murdoch, 1923 synonym of † Tibersyrnola semiconcava (P. Marshall & Murdoch, 1923)
- Syrnola serotina A. Adams, 1863: synonym of Tibersyrnola serotina (A. Adams, 1863)
- Syrnola simplex (Angas, 1871): synonym of Megastomia simplex (Angas, 1871)
- Syrnola solidula (Dunker, 1860): synonym of Pyramidella solidula (Dunker, 1860)
- † Syrnola spargana Cossmann, 1896: synonym of † Cossmannica spargana (Cossmann, 1896) (uperseded combination)
- Syrnola striatula (Jeffreys, 1856): synonym of Ebala striatula (Jeffreys, 1856)
- Syrnola tarpeia Bartsch, 1915: synonym of Pyramidella tarpeia Bartsch, 1915 (taxon inquirendum)
- Syrnola tenuisculpta (Lischke, 1872): synonym of Iphiana tenuisculpta (Lischke, 1872)
- † Syrnola tepikiensis Powell, 1934: synonym of † Tibersyrnola tepikiensis (Powell, 1934)
- Syrnola unifasciata (Forbes, 1844): synonym of Eulimella unifasciata (Forbes, 1844)
- Syrnola vietnamica Saurin, 1959: synonym of Syrnola elegans (A. Adams, 1854)
- † Syrnola vixornata Marwick, 1931: synonym of † Odostomia vixornata (Marwick, 1931) (original combination)
- † Syrnola waihoraensis Marwick, 1931: synonym of † Eulimella waihoraensis (Marwick, 1931) (original combination)
- † Syrnola waipaoa Marwick, 1931: synonym of † Odostomia waipaoa (Marwick, 1931)
- Syrnola wenzi Nordsieck, 1972: synonym of Tibersyrnola unifasciata (Forbes, 1844)
