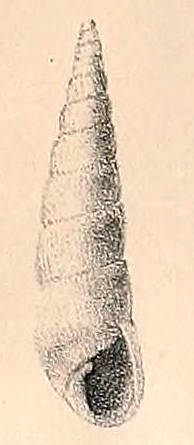
- Drawing of a shell of Styloptygma jaculum

Scientific classification
- Kingdom: Animalia
- Phylum: Mollusca
- Class: Gastropoda
- Family: Pyramidellidae
- Subfamily: Syrnolinae
- Tribe: Syrnolini
- Genus: Styloptygma; A. Adams, 1860

= Styloptygma =

Genus of gastropods

Styloptygma is a genus of sea snails, marine gastropod mollusks in the family Pyramidellidae, the pyrams and their allies.

== Species ==
Species within the genus Styloptygma include:

- Styloptygma aciculina (Souverbie, 1865)
- Styloptygma acuminatum (Gould, 1861 in 1859–61)
- Styloptygma beatrix Melvill, 1910
- Styloptygma cereum A. Adams, 1863
- Styloptygma clymene Melvill, 1918
- Styloptygma cometes Melvill, 1910
- Styloptygma fromageti Saurin, 1959
- Styloptygma gibbum A. Adams, 1863
- Styloptygma hataisinkishii Nomura, 1938
- Styloptygma jaculum (Melvill & Standen, 1896)
- Styloptygma lacteolum Preston, 1903
- Styloptygma larvula A. Adams, 1863
- Styloptygma luteum (Garrett, 1872)
- Styloptygma onagawaensis (Nomura, 1938)
- Styloptygma pupiformis (A. Adams, 1860)
- Styloptygma taeniatum A. Adams, 1863
- Styloptygma titizimanum (Nomura, 1939)
- Styloptygma typicum (Tryon, 1886)
- Styloptygma versicolor (Melvill & Standen, 1897)

Species brought into synonymy

- Styloptygma acuminata [sic]: synonym of Styloptygma acuminatum (Gould, 1861)
- Styloptygma andamanensis Preston, 1908: synonym of Odostomia andamanensis (Preston, 1908)
- Styloptygma aurantiaca Angas, 1867: synonym of Syrnola aurantiaca (Angas, 1867) (original combination)
- Styloptygma lacteola [sic]: synonym of Styloptygma lacteolum Preston, 1903
- Styloptygma lendix Adams A. 1863: synonym of Syrnola lendix (A. Adams, 1863)
- Styloptygma lutea [sic]: synonym of Styloptygma luteum (Garrett, 1873)
- Styloptygma onagawaensis [sic]: synonym of Styloptygma onagawaense (Nomura, 1938)
- Styloptygma queenslandica (Laseron, 1959): synonym of Styloptygma versicolor (Melvill & Standen, 1897)
- Styloptygma serotina [sic]: synonym of Tibersyrnola serotina (A. Adams, 1863)
- Styloptygma serotinum (A. Adams, 1863): synonym of Tibersyrnola serotina (A. Adams, 1863)
- Styloptygma taeniata [sic]: synonym of Styloptygma taeniatum (A. Adams, 1863)
- Styloptygma terebroides Kuroda & Kawamoto in Kawamoto & Tanabe, 1956: synonym of Puposyrnola terebroides (Kuroda & Kawamoto, 1956)
- Styloptygma titizimana [sic]: synonym of Styloptygma titizimanum (Nomura, 1939)
- Styloptygma typica [sic]: synonym of Styloptygma typicum (Tryon, 1886)
