= S. cinnamomea =

S. cinnamomea may refer to:

- Sporophila cinnamomea, the chestnut seedeater, a bird species found in Argentina, Brazil, Paraguay and Uruguay
- Synallaxis cinnamomea, the stripe-breasted spinetail, a bird species found in Trinidad, Tobago, Venezuela and Colombia
- Syrnola cinnamomea, a sea snail species found off Japan

== See also ==
- Cinnamomea (disambiguation)
