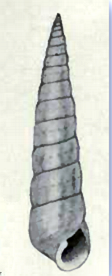
- Drawing of a shell of Tibersyrnola bacillum

Scientific classification
- Kingdom: Animalia
- Phylum: Mollusca
- Class: Gastropoda
- Family: Pyramidellidae
- Subfamily: Syrnolinae
- Tribe: Syrnolini
- Genus: Tibersyrnola; Laws, 1937

= Tibersyrnola =

Genus of gastropods

Tibersyrnola is a genus of sea snails, marine gastropod mollusks in the family Pyramidellidae, the pyrams and their allies.

== Species ==
Species within the genus Tibersyrnola include:

- Tibersyrnola bacillum (Pilsbry, 1901)
- Tibersyrnola cinnamomea (A. Adams, 1863)
- Tibersyrnola guzzettii Bozzetti, 2007
- † Tibersyrnola inexpectata Laws, 1937
- Tibersyrnola lawsi (Powell, 1934) †
- Tibersyrnola lepidula (Habe, 1961)
- † Tibersyrnola pupaformis Grant-Mackie & Chapman-Smith 1971
- † Tibersyrnola semiconcava (P. Marshall & R. Murdoch, 1923)
- Tibersyrnola serotina (A. Adams, 1863)
- † Tibersyrnola tepikiensis (Powell, 1934)
- Tibersyrnola unifasciata (Forbes, 1844)
