= Syrnola fasciata =

Scientific classification
- Kingdom: Animalia
- Phylum: Mollusca
- Class: Gastropoda
- Family: Pyramidellidae
- Genus: Syrnola
- Species: S. fasciata

Binomial name
- Syrnola fasciata (Jickeli, 1882)

Synonyms
- Syrnola solidula var. fasciata Jickeli 1882 (basionym); Syrnola massauensis Micali and Palazzi 1992,

Species of gastropod

Syrnola fasciata is a species of sea snail, a marine gastropod mollusk in the family Pyramidellidae, the pyrams and their allies.

== Description ==
The length of the shell measures 4.5 mm. It shows two brownish cords on a whitish background on the body whorl.

== Distribution ==
This marine species occurs in the following locations:

- Indo-Pacific Region
- European waters (ERMS scope)
- Mediterranean Sea : off Cyprus and Israel.
- Aegean Sea off Greece and Turkey (as an introduced species)
- Mersin Bay
