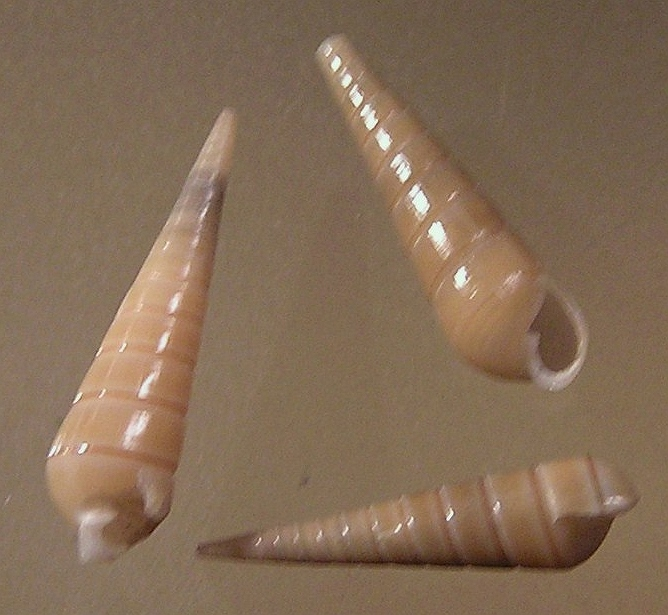

Scientific classification
- Kingdom: Animalia
- Phylum: Mollusca
- Class: Gastropoda
- Family: Pyramidellidae
- Genus: Syrnola
- Species: S. adamsi

Binomial name
- Syrnola adamsi (Tryon, 1886)

= Syrnola adamsi =

Species of gastropod

Syrnola adamsi is a species of sea snail, a marine gastropod mollusk in the family Pyramidellidae, the pyrams and their allies.

== Description ==
The length of the shell varies between 12.1 mm and 16.6 mm.

== Distribution ==
This marine species occurs off the Philippines.
