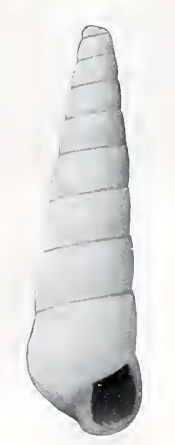
- Apertural view of a shell of S. aganea

Scientific classification
- Kingdom: Animalia
- Phylum: Mollusca
- Class: Gastropoda
- Family: Pyramidellidae
- Genus: Syrnola
- Species: S. aganea

Binomial name
- Syrnola aganea (Bartasch, 1915)

Synonyms
- Eulimella nivea E. A. Smith, 1904; Pyramidella aganea Bartsch, 1915

= Syrnola aganea =

Species of gastropod

Syrnola aganea is a species of sea snail, a marine gastropod mollusk in the family Pyramidellidae, the pyrams and their allies.

== Description ==
The length of the shell measures 7.5 mm.

== Distribution ==
The type specimen of this marine species was found off Port Alfred, South Africa.
