= Syrnola angasi =

Scientific classification
- Kingdom: Animalia
- Phylum: Mollusca
- Class: Gastropoda
- Family: Pyramidellidae
- Genus: Syrnola
- Species: S. angasi

Binomial name
- Syrnola angasi (Tryon, 1886)

Synonyms
- Agatha angasi (Tryon, 1886); Odostomia angasi Tryon, 1886 (original combination); Odostomia lactea Angas, 1867

Species of gastropod

Syrnola angasi is a species of sea snail, a marine gastropod mollusk in the family Pyramidellidae, the pyrams and their allies.
