= Syrnola karachiensis =

Scientific classification
- Kingdom: Animalia
- Phylum: Mollusca
- Class: Gastropoda
- Family: Pyramidellidae
- Genus: Syrnola
- Species: S. karachiensis

Binomial name
- Syrnola karachiensis Melvill, 1897

Species of gastropod

Syrnola karachiensis is a species of sea snail, a marine gastropod mollusk in the family Pyramidellidae, the pyrams and their allies.

== Description ==
The ochraceous-brown, subpellucid shell is very sharply pointed. It is an attenuate species with eleven smooth straight whorls in the teleoconch. A slight canaliculation exists at the sutures. The aperture is oblong. The outer lip simple, and somewhat reflexed at the base. The columella is one-plaited.

== Distribution ==
This marine species occurs off Pakistan.
