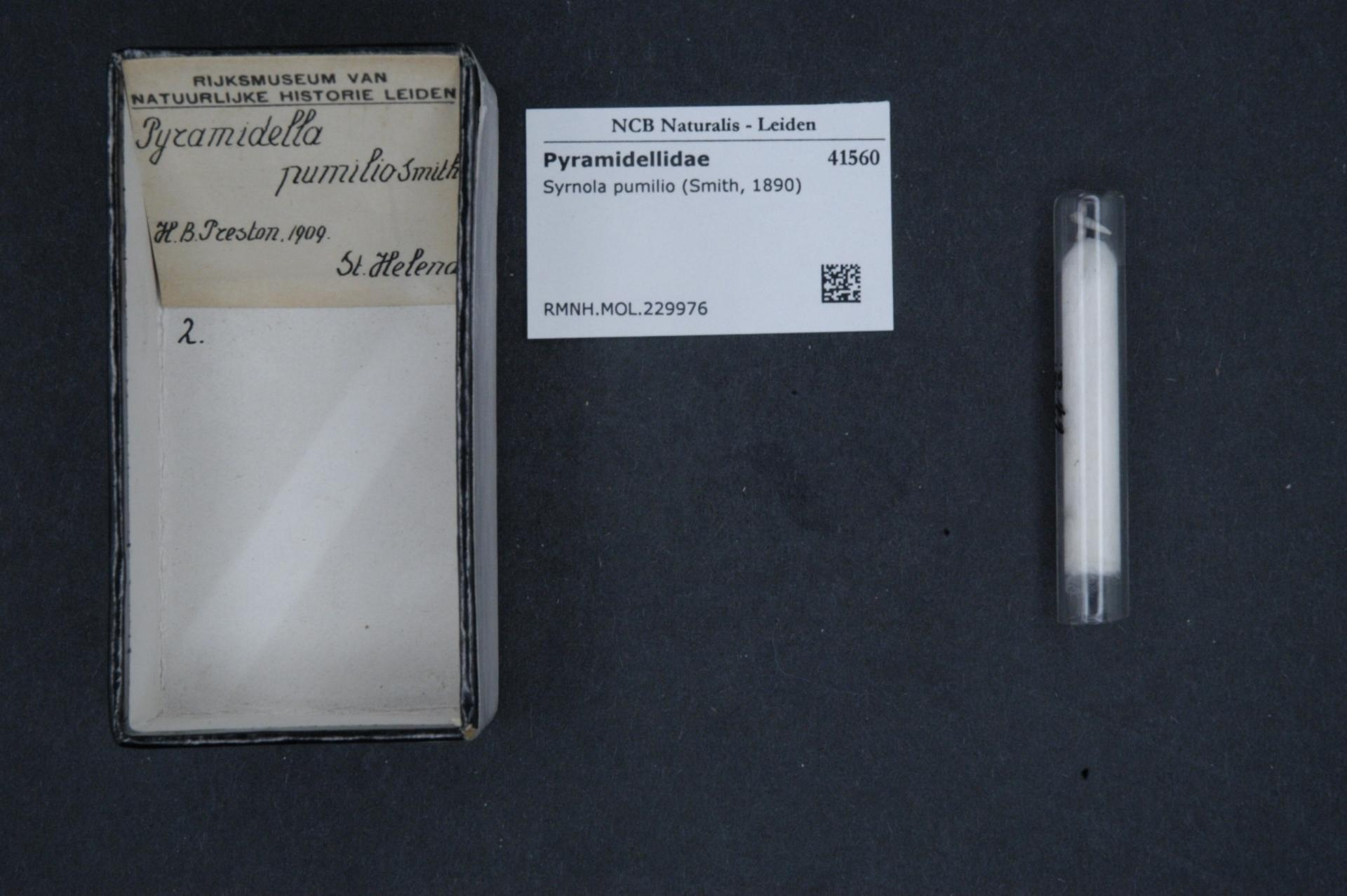
- Syrnola pumilio

Scientific classification
- Kingdom: Animalia
- Phylum: Mollusca
- Class: Gastropoda
- Family: Pyramidellidae
- Genus: Syrnola
- Species: S. pumilio

Binomial name
- Syrnola pumilio (E. A. Smith, 1890)

Synonyms
- Obeliscus (Syrnola) pumilio E. A. Smith, 1890 (basionym)

= Syrnola pumilio =

Species of gastropod

Syrnola pumilio is a species of sea snail, a marine gastropod mollusk in the family Pyramidellidae, the pyrams and their allies.

== Description ==
The length of the shell measures 6.3 mm. Syrnola pumilio exhibits sexual reproduction and is associated with marine benthic habitats, which are the ecosystems occurring on the ocean floor.

== Distribution ==
This marine species is endemic to the Eastern Atlantic off St. Helena.
