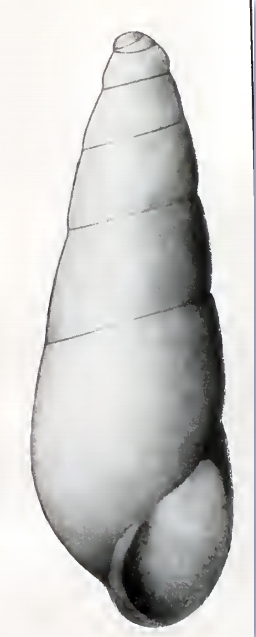
- Apertural view of a shell of S. hera

Scientific classification
- Kingdom: Animalia
- Phylum: Mollusca
- Class: Gastropoda
- Family: Pyramidellidae
- Genus: Syrnola
- Species: S. hera

Binomial name
- Syrnola hera (Bartsch, 1915)

Synonyms
- Pyramidella (Syrnola) hera Bartsch, 1915

= Syrnola hera =

Species of gastropod

Syrnola hera is a species of sea snail, a marine gastropod mollusk in the family Pyramidellidae, the pyrams and their allies.

== Description ==
The milk-white shell has an elongate-conic shape. Its length measures 4 mm. The whorls of the protoconch number more than one. They are obliquely immersed in the first of the succeeding turns, above which the tilted edge of the last volution only projects. The six whorls of the teleoconch are very slightly rounded, and very feebly shouldered at the summit. They are marked by rather coarse lines of growth and exceedingly fine spiral striations. The preceding whorl shines through the substance of the succeeding turns near the summit and appears as a band a little differently colored than the rest of the shell. The sutures well marked. The periphery of the body whorl is well rounded. The base of the shell is slightly prolonged, and well rounded. The aperture is ovate. The posterior angle is acute. The outer lip is thin. The inner lip is short, reflected over and appressed to the base. The parietal wall is covered with a thin callus.

== Distribution ==
The type specimen of this marine species was found off Port Alfred, South Africa.
