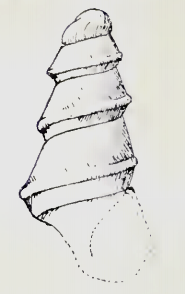
- Drawing of a fragment of a shell of Syrnola thelma

Scientific classification
- Kingdom: Animalia
- Phylum: Mollusca
- Class: Gastropoda
- Family: Pyramidellidae
- Genus: Syrnola
- Species: †S. thelma

Binomial name
- †Syrnola thelma Dall, 1913

= Syrnola thelma =

Extinct species of gastropod

Syrnola thelma is an extinct species of sea snail, a marine gastropod mollusk in the family Pyramidellidae, the pyrams and their allies.

== Description ==
The small shell has an elongate-conic shape. It has a smooth appearance, except for incremental lines. The suture is distinct but not deep. The apical portion is decollate. The aperture is narrowly ovate. The outer lip is simple and blunt. The base of the shell rounds into a strongly twisted short pillar. The body of the shell has no visible callus. The length of decollate fragment (two whorls) measures 2 mm, the diameter 1 mm.

== Distribution ==
A fragment of the shell of this brackish water species has been found near Alexandria, Louisiana.
