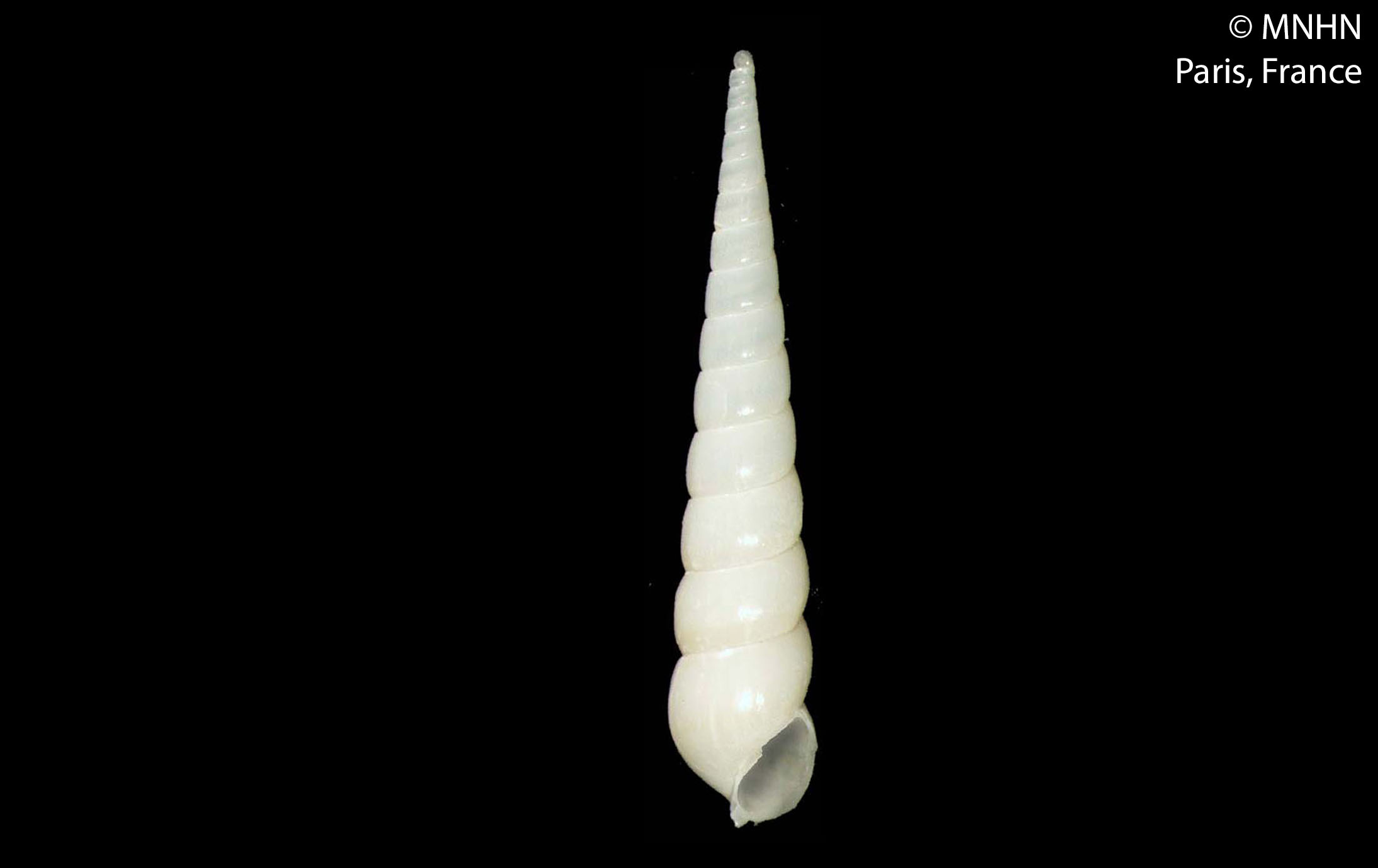

Scientific classification
- Kingdom: Animalia
- Phylum: Mollusca
- Class: Gastropoda
- Family: Pyramidellidae
- Genus: Syrnola
- Species: S. cuspidata

Binomial name
- Syrnola cuspidata Garrett, 1873

= Syrnola cuspidata =

Species of gastropod

Syrnola cuspidata is a species of sea snail, a marine gastropod mollusc in the family Pyramidellidae, the pyrams and their allies.
