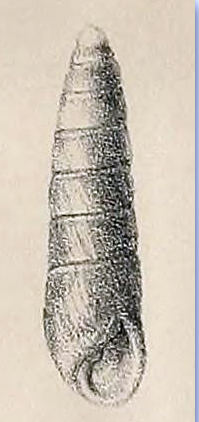
- Drawing of a shell of Syrnola violacea

Scientific classification
- Kingdom: Animalia
- Phylum: Mollusca
- Class: Gastropoda
- Family: Pyramidellidae
- Genus: Syrnola
- Species: S. violacea

Binomial name
- Syrnola violacea Melvill, J.C. & R. Standen, 1896, "1897"

= Syrnola violacea =

Species of gastropod

Syrnola violacea is a species of sea snail, a marine gastropod mollusk in the family Pyramidellidae, the pyramids and their allies.

== Description ==
The shell is smooth and violaceous. Its length measures 11 mm. The teleoconch contains ten whorls. These are quite plain except for the line of the revolving plica showing through each whorl transversely, just below the sutures. The aperture is somewhat oblique. The outer lip is plain. The columella is one-plaited.

== Distribution ==
This species occurs in the Pacific Ocean off the Loyalty Islands.
