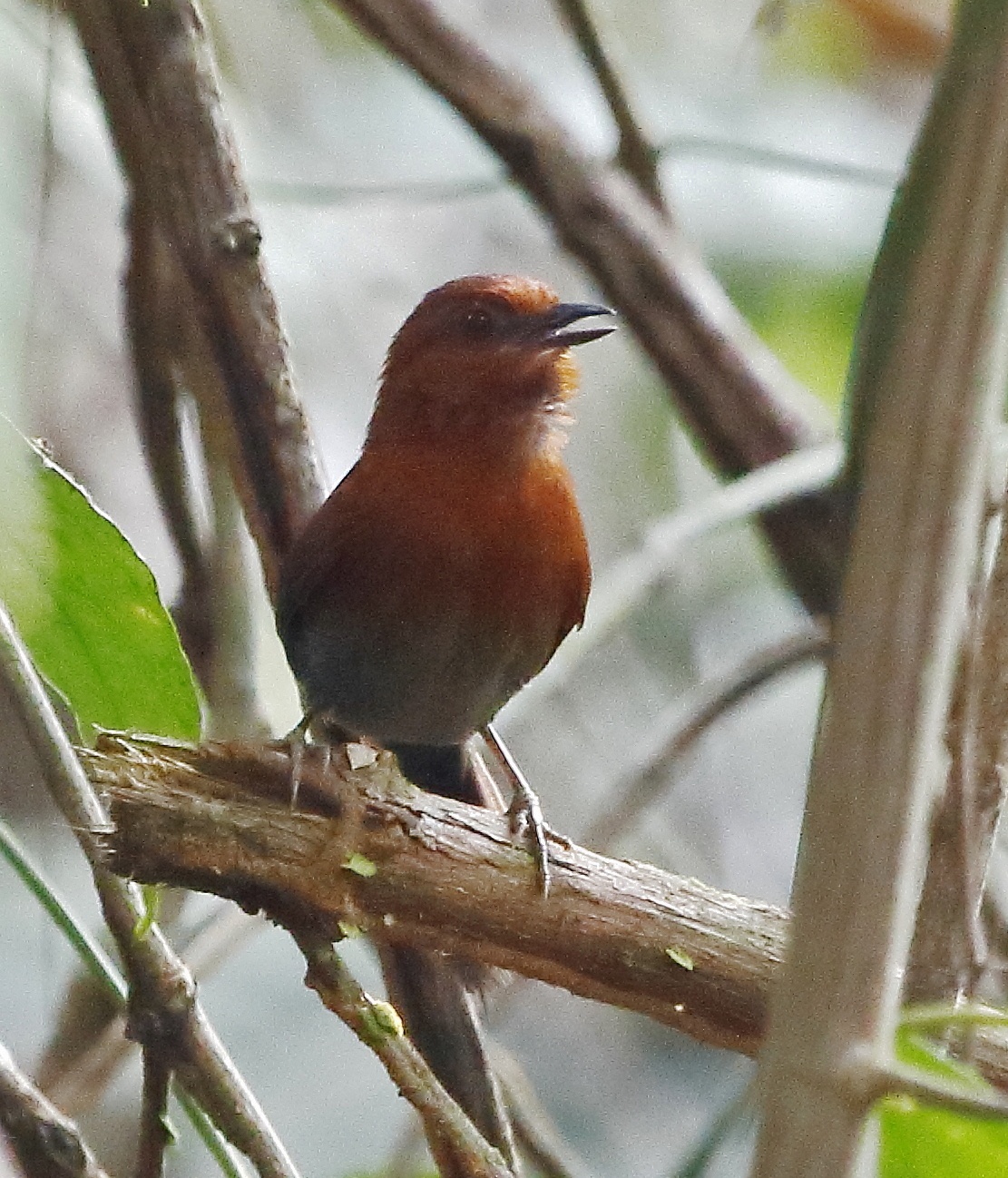
- at Carajás Mountains, Pará state, Brazil

Conservation status
- Least Concern (IUCN 3.1)

Scientific classification
- Kingdom: Animalia
- Phylum: Chordata
- Class: Aves
- Order: Passeriformes
- Family: Furnariidae
- Genus: Synallaxis
- Species: S. cherriei

Binomial name
- Synallaxis cherriei Gyldenstolpe, 1930

= Chestnut-throated spinetail =

Species of bird

The chestnut-throated spinetail (Synallaxis cherriei) is a species of bird in the Furnariinae subfamily of the ovenbird family Furnariidae. It is mainly found in Bolivia, Brazil, Colombia, Ecuador, and Peru.

== Taxonomy and systematics ==
The chestnut-throated spinetail is closely related to the stripe-breasted spinetail (S. cinnamomea) and ruddy spinetail (S. rutilans).

Beyond that, the chestnut-throated spinetail's taxonomy is unsettled. The International Ornithological Committee and BirdLife International's Handbook of the Birds of the World assign it three subspecies. They are the nominate S. c. cherriei (Gyldenstolpe, 1930), S. c. saturata (Carriker, 1934), and S. c. napoensis (Gyldenstolpe, 1930). In contrast, the Clements taxonomy does not recognize S. c. saturata, which the other two systems include in napoensis.

This article follows the three-subspecies model.

== Description ==
The chestnut-throated spinetail is about 13 to 15 cm (5.1 to 5.9 in) long and weighs about 14 to 17 g (0.49 to 0.60 oz). Adult males of the nominate subspecies have a deep rufous-chestnut forecrown, face, and throat. Their hindcrown, nape, and back are chestnut strongly washed with olive-brown, and their rump and uppertail coverts are dark brown. Their wing coverts are mostly chestnut and their flight feathers dark fuscous. Their tail is slaty-black; it is graduated and the feathers are pointed. Their breast is deep rufous-chestnut, their belly and undertail coverts are gray tinged with olive-brown, and their flanks are slightly darker than their belly. Their iris is ivory gray to dark brown, their maxilla black, their mandible dark gray, and their legs and feet dusky olive to brownish gray. Adult females have slightly paler throat and belly than males. Juveniles have darker and more olivaceous upperparts than adults, with only a hint of rufous. Their throat is whitish with dusky tips on the feathers; their lower breast and belly feathers have faint brown edges. Their mandible is whitish. Subspecies S. c. napoensis has more rufous on its forehead than the nominate, with paler edges on the flight feathers and a darker belly. Subspecies S. c. saturata is paler overall and browner above than the nominate, with a more orange-rufous throat and breast and a paler gray belly.

== Distribution and habitat ==
The chestnut-throated spinetail has a disjunct distribution. The nominate subspecies is the most widespread of the three; it is found in the central Amazon Basin in the Brazilian states of Rondônia, Mato Grosso, Pará, and Tocantins. Subspecies S. c. napoensis is found in southern Colombia's Putumayo Department and in Ecuador's Sucumbíos and Napo provinces. Subspecies S. c. saturata is found in northern and central Peru and in northern Bolivia.

The separate populations of the chestnut-throated spinetail inhabit different landscapes. In Amazonian Brazil it mostly occurs in terra firme forest, and mostly in stands of Chusquea bamboo. The disjunct populations further west occur mostly in thick vegetation in the understorey of the edges of lowland and foothill primary forest and within secondary forest, with no particular association with bamboo.

== Behavior ==
=== Movement ===
The chestnut-throated spinetail is a year-round resident throughout its range.

=== Feeding ===
The chestnut-throated spinetail feeds on arthropods. It typically forages in pairs, usually keeping in dense vegetation, and usually within about 3 m (10 ft) of the ground. It does sometimes forage on the ground and as high as 8 m (26 ft) above it.

=== Breeding ===
Juvenile chestnut-throated spinetails accompanied by adults have been observed in May and June. Nothing else is known about the species' breeding biology.

=== Vocalization ===
The chestnut-throated spinetail's song is a " 'prruh-pih' (2nd note higher) in long series with short interruptions". Its calls while foraging include "a high-pitched psiu and piwwwh".

== Status ==
The IUCN originally in 1988 assessed the chestnut-throated spinetail as Threatened, then in 2004 as Near Threatened, and since 2021 as of Least Concern. It has a large range; its population size is not known and is believed to be decreasing. The primary threat is deforestation, especially for the smaller populations to the west of central Amazonia. "The Chestnut-throated Spinetail seems to be more vulnerable to habitat fragmentation than to habitat disturbance [and] with other bamboo specialists, it may be extinction prone in small fragments as periodic large-scale bamboo die-offs may isolate birds in sub-optimal habitats if they are unable to cross hostile non-forest matrixes."
