= Syrnola manilensis =

Scientific classification
- Kingdom: Animalia
- Phylum: Mollusca
- Class: Gastropoda
- Family: Pyramidellidae
- Genus: Syrnola
- Species: S. manilensis

Binomial name
- Syrnola manilensis Boettger, 1896

Species of gastropod

Syrnola manilensis is a species of sea snail, a marine gastropod mollusk in the family Pyramidellidae, the pyrams and their allies.

== Distribution ==
This marine species occurs off the Philippines.
