= Syrnola fernandina =

Scientific classification
- Kingdom: Animalia
- Phylum: Mollusca
- Class: Gastropoda
- Family: Pyramidellidae
- Genus: Syrnola
- Species: S. fernandina

Binomial name
- Syrnola fernandina (Bartsch, 1927)

Synonyms
- Pyramidella (Syrnola) fernandina Bartsch in Dall, 1927 (basionym)

Species of gastropod

Syrnola fernandina is a species of sea snail, a marine gastropod mollusk in the family Pyramidellidae, the pyrams and their allies.

== Description ==
The length of the shell measures 6 mm.

== Distribution ==
This species was found in the Atlantic Ocean off Georgia, USA at depths between 538 m and 805 m.
