= Syrnola arae =

Scientific classification
- Kingdom: Animalia
- Phylum: Mollusca
- Class: Gastropoda
- Family: Pyramidellidae
- Genus: Syrnola
- Species: S. arae

Binomial name
- Syrnola arae Peñas & Rolán, 2002

Species of gastropod

Syrnola arae is a species of sea snail, a marine gastropod mollusk in the family Pyramidellidae, the pyrams and their allies.

== Distribution ==
This species occurs in the Atlantic Ocean off Ivory Coast, West Africa.
