= Syrnola unilineata =

Scientific classification
- Kingdom: Animalia
- Phylum: Mollusca
- Class: Gastropoda
- Family: Pyramidellidae
- Genus: Syrnola
- Species: S. unilineata

Binomial name
- Syrnola unilineata Garrett, 1873

Species of gastropod

Syrnola unilineata is a species of sea snail, a marine gastropod mollusc in the family Pyramidellidae, the pyrams and their allies.
