= Syrnola producta =

- Drawing of a shell of Syrnola producta

Scientific classification
- Kingdom: Animalia
- Phylum: Mollusca
- Class: Gastropoda
- Family: Pyramidellidae
- Genus: Syrnola
- Species: S. producta

Binomial name
- Syrnola producta (C. B. Adams, 1840)

Synonyms
- Chemnitzia producta (C. B. Adams, 1840); Jaminia producta C. B. Adams, 1840 (basionym); Odostomia producta (C. B. Adams, 1840); Pyramidella producta (C. B. Adams, 1840); Sayella producta (C. B. Adams, 1840)

Species of gastropod

Syrnola producta is a species of sea snail, a marine gastropod mollusk in the family Pyramidellidae, the pyrams and their allies.

== Description ==
The length of the shell varies between 4 mm and 6.4 mm. The teleoconch of the smooth shell contains eight flatly convex whorls. The color of the shell is white, under a light brown epidermis. The columella is flexuously plicate.

== Distribution ==
This species occurs in the following locations:

- Northwest Atlantic off Massachusetts, Connecticut, New York, and New Jersey

== Notes ==
Additional information regarding this species:

- Distribution: Range: 42°N to 40°N; 74°W to 70°W. Distribution: USA: Massachusetts, Connecticut, New York, New Jersey
