= Syrnola michaeli =

Scientific classification
- Kingdom: Animalia
- Phylum: Mollusca
- Class: Gastropoda
- Family: Pyramidellidae
- Genus: Syrnola
- Species: S. michaeli

Binomial name
- Syrnola michaeli Tenison-Woods, 1877

Species of gastropod

Syrnola michaeli is a species of slimy sea snail, a marine gastropod mollusk in the family Pyramidellidae, the pyrams and their allies.

== Distribution ==
This marine species occurs off Tasmania.
