= Syrnola thomensis =

Scientific classification
- Kingdom: Animalia
- Phylum: Mollusca
- Class: Gastropoda
- Family: Pyramidellidae
- Genus: Syrnola
- Species: S. thomensis

Binomial name
- Syrnola thomensis Tomlin & Shackleford, 1915

Species of gastropod

Syrnola thomensis is a species of sea snail, a marine gastropod mollusk in the family Pyramidellidae, the pyrams and their allies.

It occurs in the Atlantic Ocean off São Tomé, Príncipe, Congo and Guinea.
