= Syrnola vanhyningi =

Scientific classification
- Kingdom: Animalia
- Phylum: Mollusca
- Class: Gastropoda
- Family: Pyramidellidae
- Genus: Syrnola
- Species: S. vanhyningi

Binomial name
- Syrnola vanhyningi (Bartsch, 1944)

Synonyms
- Orinella vanhyningi Bartsch, 1944 (basionym); Sayella vanhyningi (Bartsch, 1944)

Species of gastropod

Syrnola vanhyningi is a species of sea snail, a marine gastropod mollusk in the family Pyramidellidae, the pyrams and their allies.

== Description ==
The length of the shell measures 2.3 mm.

== Distribution ==
This species occurs in the following locations:

- Gulf of Mexico off West Florida.
