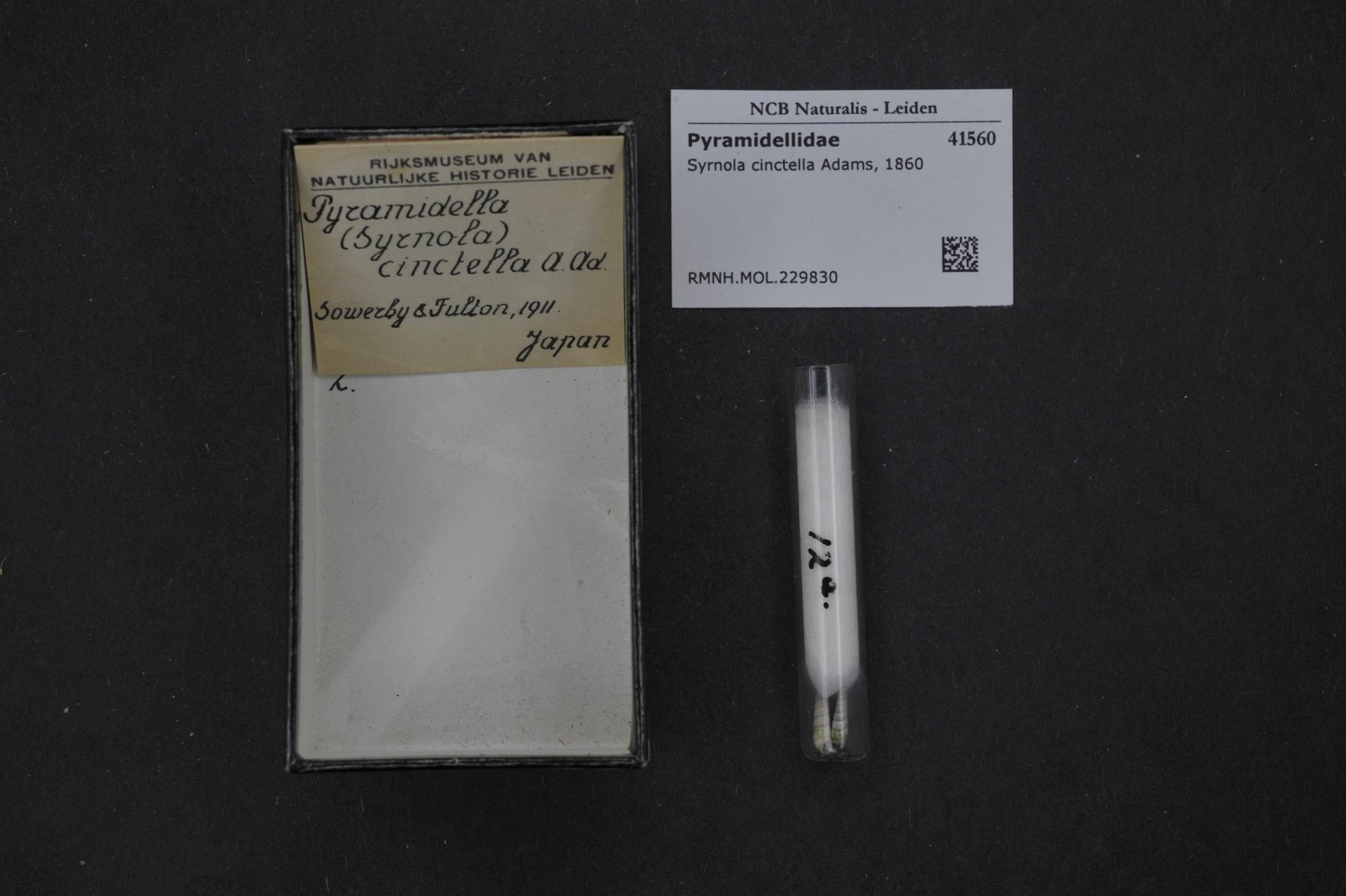

Scientific classification
- Kingdom: Animalia
- Phylum: Mollusca
- Class: Gastropoda
- Family: Pyramidellidae
- Genus: Syrnola
- Species: S. cinctella

Binomial name
- Syrnola cinctella (Adams A., 1860)

= Syrnola cinctella =

Species of gastropod

Syrnola cinctella is a species of sea snail, a marine gastropod mollusk in the family Pyramidellidae, the pyrams and their allies.

== Distribution ==
This species occurs in the following locations:

- European waters (ERMS scope)
- Mediterranean Sea (as a casual marine alien species)
