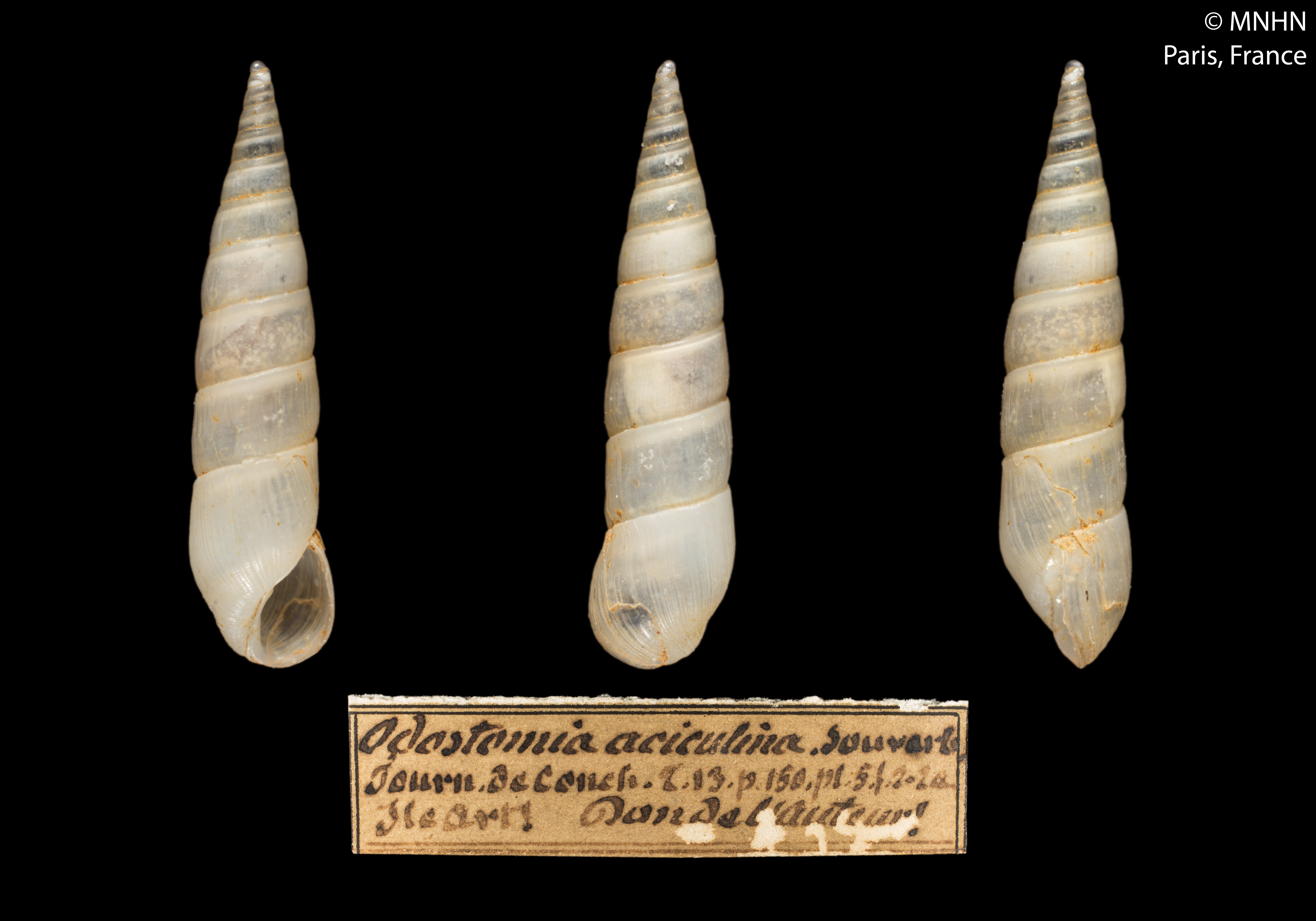
- Shell of Styloptygma aciculina (syntype at MNHN, Paris)

Scientific classification
- Kingdom: Animalia
- Phylum: Mollusca
- Class: Gastropoda
- Family: Pyramidellidae
- Genus: Styloptygma
- Species: S. aciculina

Binomial name
- Styloptygma aciculina (Souverbie, 1865)

Synonyms
- Odostomia aciculina Souverbie, 1865 (original combination)

= Styloptygma aciculina =

Species of gastropod

Styloptygma aciculina is a species of sea snail, a marine gastropod mollusk in the family Pyramidellidae, the pyrams and their allies.

== Description ==
The length of the shell attains 7 mm.

== Distribution ==
This marine species occurs off New Caledonia.
