= Syrnola georgiana =

Scientific classification
- Kingdom: Animalia
- Phylum: Mollusca
- Class: Gastropoda
- Family: Pyramidellidae
- Genus: Syrnola
- Species: S. georgiana

Binomial name
- Syrnola georgiana (Bartsch, 1927)

Synonyms
- Pyramidella (Syrnola) georgiana Bartsch in Dall, 1927 (basionym)

Species of gastropod

Syrnola georgiana is a species of sea snail, a marine gastropod mollusk in the family Pyramidellidae, the pyrams and their allies.

== Description ==
The shell grows to a length of 5.2 mm (0.20 in) and a diameter of 2.2 mm (0.087 in). The shell is elongate-ovate in shape, with a bluish-white colour and a semi-translucent appearance. The nuclear whorls are very small and mostly hidden within the first post-nuclear turn, with only the rounded edge of the final nuclear whorl slightly projecting. Their surface is marked by growth lines and fine, closely spaced, microscopic spiral striations. The suture, where the whorls meet, is only slightly indented. The inner lip is thick and reflects back onto the base for about half its length. It also features a prominent fold situated slightly forward of its point of attachment.

== Distribution ==
The type specimen was found in the Atlantic Ocean off Georgia, USA at a depths between 538 m (1,765 ft) and 805 m (2,641 ft).
