= Syrnola floridana =

Scientific classification
- Kingdom: Animalia
- Phylum: Mollusca
- Class: Gastropoda
- Family: Pyramidellidae
- Genus: Syrnola
- Species: S. floridana

Binomial name
- Syrnola floridana (Bartsch, 1927)

Synonyms
- Pyramidella (Syrnola) floridana Bartsch in Dall, 1927 (basionym)

Species of gastropod

Syrnola floridana is a species of sea snail, a marine gastropod mollusk in the family Pyramidellidae, the pyrams and their allies.

== Description ==
The length of the shell measures 3.5 mm.

== Distribution ==
The type specimen was found in the Atlantic Ocean off Georgia, USA at a depth of 538 m.
