= Styloptygma cereum =

Scientific classification
- Kingdom: Animalia
- Phylum: Mollusca
- Class: Gastropoda
- Family: Pyramidellidae
- Genus: Styloptygma
- Species: S. cereum

Binomial name
- Styloptygma cereum A. Adams, 1863

Species of gastropod

Styloptygma cereum is a species of sea snail, a marine gastropod mollusk in the family Pyramidellidae, the pyrams and their allies.

== Distribution ==
This marine species occurs off Japan.
