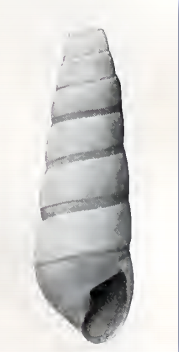
- Apertural view of a shell of S. pyrrha

Scientific classification
- Kingdom: Animalia
- Phylum: Mollusca
- Class: Gastropoda
- Family: Pyramidellidae
- Genus: Syrnola
- Species: S. pyrrha

Binomial name
- Syrnola pyrrha (Bartsch, 1915)

Synonyms
- Pyramidella (Syrnola) pyrrha Bartsch, 1915 (basionym)

= Syrnola pyrrha =

Species of gastropod

Syrnola pyrrha is a species of sea snail, a marine gastropod mollusk in the family Pyramidellidae, the pyrams and their allies.

== Description ==
The shell has an elongate-conic shape. it is creamy yellow, with a narrow, golden brown band situated about one-fourth of the distance between the apex and suture posterior to the suture. (The whorls of the protoconch are decollated). The whorls of the teleoconch are slightly rounded, and feebly shouldered at the summit. They are marked with numerous fine, slightly retractive, incremental lines, and exceedingly fine, spiral striatums. The periphery of the body whorl is well rounded. The base of the shell is slightly produced, well rounded, and marked like the spire. The aperture is subquadrate. The posterior angle is obtuse. The outer lip is thin. The inner lip is flexuous, slightly reflected, and provided with a moderately strong fold a little anterior to its insertion. The parietal wall is glazed with a thin callus.

== Distribution ==
The type specimen of this marine species was found off Port Alfred, South Africa.
