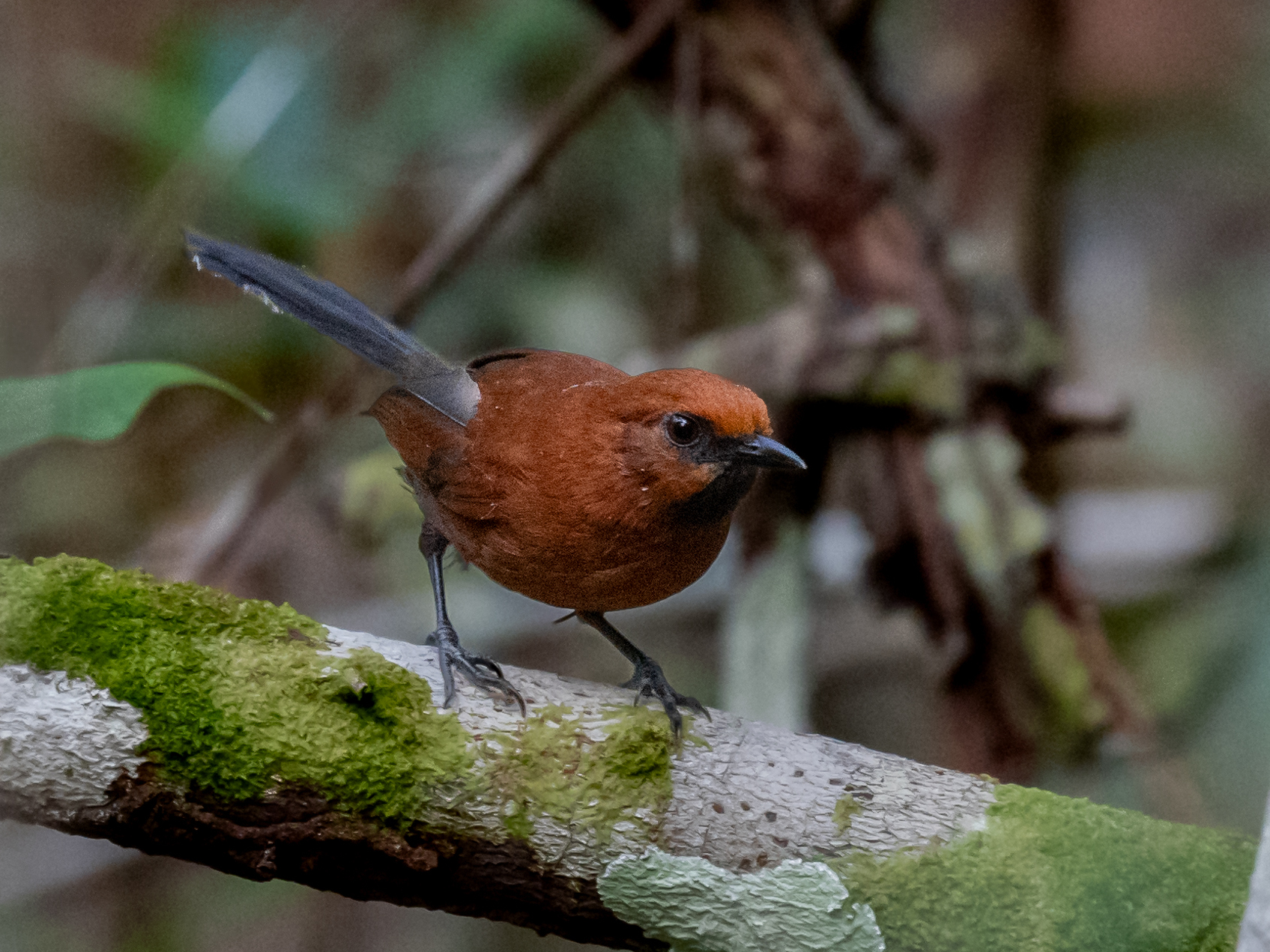

Conservation status
- Least Concern (IUCN 3.1)

Scientific classification
- Kingdom: Animalia
- Phylum: Chordata
- Class: Aves
- Order: Passeriformes
- Family: Furnariidae
- Genus: Synallaxis
- Species: S. rutilans

Binomial name
- Synallaxis rutilans Temminck, 1823

= Ruddy spinetail =

Species of bird

The ruddy spinetail (Synallaxis rutilans) is a species of bird in the Furnariinae subfamily of the ovenbird family Furnariidae. It is found in Bolivia, Brazil, Colombia, Ecuador, Guyana, Peru, Suriname, Venezuela, and possibly Guyana.

== Taxonomy and systematics ==
The ruddy spinetail has these seven subspecies:

- S. r. caquetensis Chapman, 1914
- S. r. confinis Zimmer, JT, 1935
- S. r. dissors Zimmer, JT, 1935
- S. r. amazonica Hellmayr, 1907
- S. r. rutilans Temminck, 1823
- S. r. tertia Hellmayr, 1907
- S. r. omissa Hartert, EJO, 1901

The ruddy spinetail is closely related to the stripe-breasted spinetail (S. cinnamomea) and chestnut-throated spinetail (S. cherriei).

== Description ==
The ruddy spinetail is 13 to 15 cm (5.1 to 5.9 in) long and weighs 15 to 22 g (0.53 to 0.78 oz). Adult males of the nominate subspecies S. r. rutilans have mottled blackish lores on an otherwise deep ruddy chestnut face. Their forecrown is ruddy chestnut, their hindcrown, nape, and back chestnut strongly washed with olive-brown, and their rump and uppertail coverts dull dark brown. Their wing coverts are chestnut and their flight feathers fuscous with dull chestnut edges. Their tail is slaty blackish; it is graduated and the feathers are somewhat pointed. Their throat is black, their breast bright ruddy chestnut, their belly and undertail coverts dark olive-brownish, and their flanks slightly browner than their belly. Their iris is brown to chestnut-red, their maxilla black, their mandible black (sometimes with a gray base) to blue-gray, and their legs and feet olive-gray to dark gray or black. Adult females are slightly paler than males and have more of an olive wash. Juveniles are duller and less rufous than adults, with a gray throat and vague streaks on their underparts.

The other subspecies of the ruddy spinetail differ from the nominate and each other thus:

- S. r. caquetensis: mostly rufous-chestnut crown and back, and olive-tinged fuscous flanks and center of the belly
- S. r. confinis: paler chestnut overall, no olive on nape, browner (less chestnut) edges on the flight feathers
- S. r. dissors: slightly less olivaceous back and browner (less chestnut) on wings
- S. r. amazonica: brown cast on crown and back, and rump and uppertail coverts sooty blackish
- S. r. tertia: brown cast on crown and back, and rump and uppertail coverts brown
- S. r. omissa: mostly sooty with rufous only on the wings and as a wash on the breast (very similar to juveniles of the other subspecies)

The dramatic plumage differences between the nominate and omissa hint that the latter might be a separate species, and the differences among the other subspecies are subtle and to a degree clinal. The Clements taxonomy recognizes the differences by placing omissa by itself in a "sooty" group and the other six subspecies in a "ruddy" group within the species.

== Distribution and habitat ==
The subspecies of the ruddy spinetail are found thus:

- S. r. caquetensis: from Meta Department central Colombia south through eastern Ecuador into northern Peru
- S. r. confinis: northwestern Brazil west of the Rio Negro
- S. r. dissors: from eastern Colombia's Vichada and Guainía departments east through southern Venezuela and the Guianas into northern Brazil east of the Rio Negro (but see below)
- S. r. amazonica: eastern Peru, northern Bolivia, and western and central Brazil south of the Amazon as far east as the Rio Tapajós
- S. r. rutilans: central and eastern Brazil south of the Amazon between the Tapajós and Rio Tocantins and south into northeastern Mato Grosso
- S. r. tertia: southwestern Brazil (south and west of the other subspecies) and eastern Bolivia
- S. r. omissa: eastern Brazil from the Tocantins east into northern Maranhão state

Worldwide taxonomic systems place the ruddy spinetail in all three of the Guianas but the South American Classification Committee of the American Ornithological Society recognizes no records in Guyana.

The ruddy spinetail primarily inhabits the undergrowth of terra firme forest; it also occurs in tropical lowland evergreen forest. In elevation it is found mostly below 900 m (3,000 ft) though up to 1,200 m (3,900 ft) in southern Venezuela. In Colombia it reaches only 500 m (1,600 ft) and in Ecuador only 150 m (500 ft).

== Behavior ==
=== Movement ===
The ruddy spinetail is a year-round resident throughout its range.

=== Feeding ===
The ruddy spinetail feeds on a wide variety of arthropods. It usually forages in pairs and occasionally joins mixed-species feeding flocks. It gleans prey from foliage, small branches, clusters of dead leaves, and leaf litter from the ground up to about 2 m (7 ft) above it, usually staying in dense undergrowth.

=== Breeding ===
The ruddy spinetail's nest is a globe of twigs with a horizontal entrance tunnel. The clutch size is three to four eggs. Nothing else is known about its breeding biology.

=== Vocalization ===
The ruddy spinetail's song is a "2-noted 'keéwoh (2nd note lower), constantly repeated". The song has also been interpreted as " 'tac, tac-owet', 'kít-naaa' or 'chíck-dawah' " and " 'keé-kawów' or 'keé-kow' ".

== Status ==
The IUCN has assessed the ruddy spinetail as being of Least Concern. It has a very large range; its population size is not known and is believed to be decreasing. No immediate threats have been identified. It is considered uncommon to fairly common through much of its range, though "scarce and local" in Ecuador. It occurs in many protected areas.
