= Syrnola densestriata =

Scientific classification
- Kingdom: Animalia
- Phylum: Mollusca
- Class: Gastropoda
- Family: Pyramidellidae
- Genus: Syrnola
- Species: S. densestriata

Binomial name
- Syrnola densestriata (Garrett, 1873)

Synonyms
- Odostomia densestriata Garrett, 1873; Syrnola (Iphiana) densestriata (Garrett, 1873)

Species of gastropod

Syrnola densestriata is a species of sea snail, a marine gastropod mollusk in the family Pyramidellidae, the pyrams and their allies.
