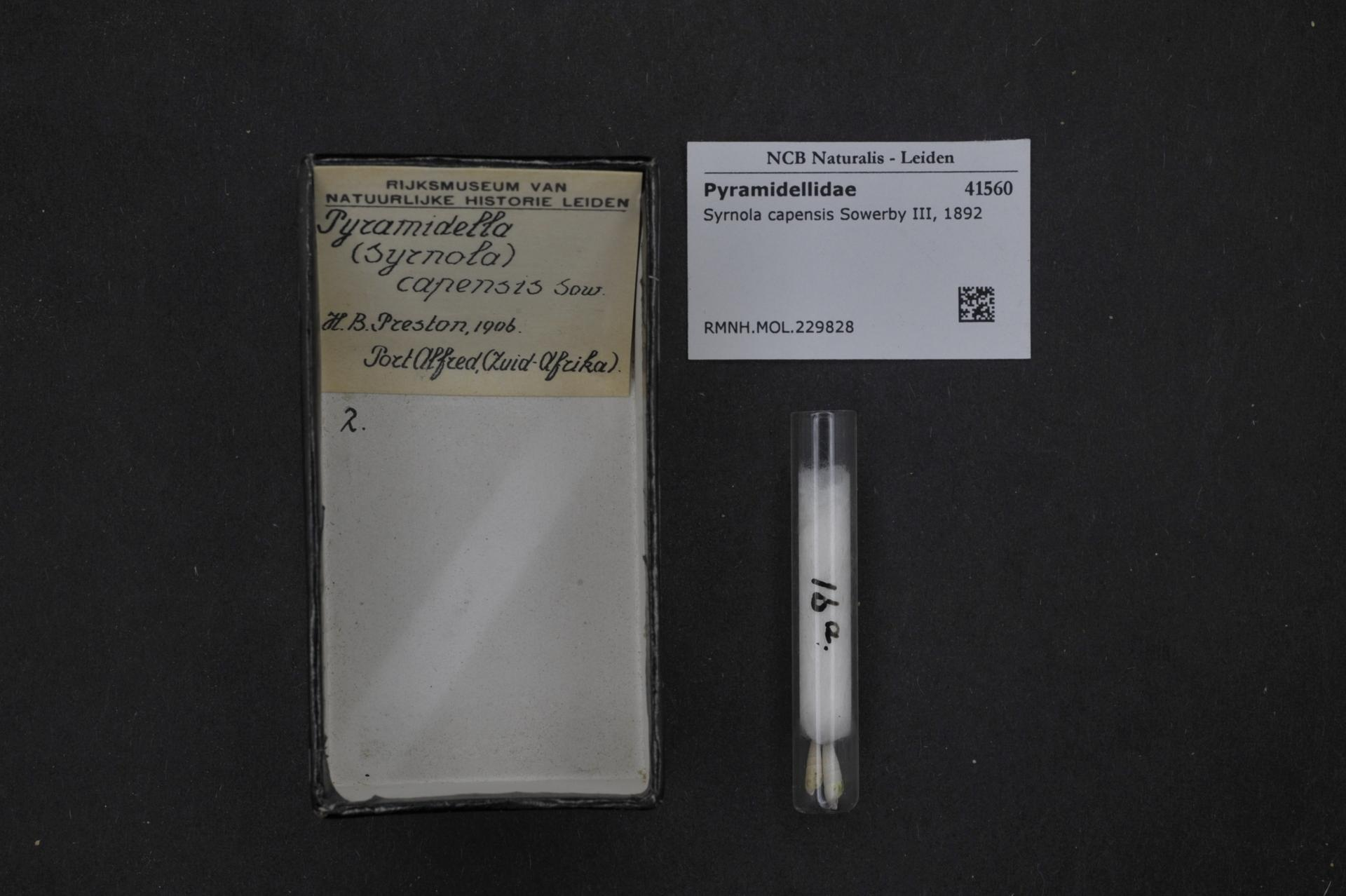

Scientific classification
- Kingdom: Animalia
- Phylum: Mollusca
- Class: Gastropoda
- Family: Pyramidellidae
- Genus: Syrnola
- Species: S. capensis

Binomial name
- Syrnola capensis (Sowerby III, 1892)

= Syrnola capensis =

Species of gastropod

Syrnola capensis is a species of sea snail, a marine gastropod mollusk in the family Pyramidellidae, the pyrams and their allies.

== Description ==
The length of the shell measures 10 mm.

== Distribution ==
This marine species occurs of Algoa Bay, Port Alfred and KwaZuluNatal, South Africa.
