= Tibersyrnola guzzettii =

Scientific classification
- Kingdom: Animalia
- Phylum: Mollusca
- Class: Gastropoda
- Family: Pyramidellidae
- Genus: Tibersyrnola
- Species: T. guzzettii

Binomial name
- Tibersyrnola guzzettii Bozzetti, 2007

Synonyms
- Syrnola (Tibersyrnola) guzzettii Bozzetti, 2007

Species of gastropod

Tibersyrnola guzzettii is a species of sea snail, a marine gastropod mollusk in the family Pyramidellidae, the pyrams and their allies.

== Description ==
The length of the shell varies between 9 mm and 14 mm.

== Distribution ==
This species occurs in the Indian Ocean off Madagascar.
