= Syrnola tincta =

Scientific classification
- Kingdom: Animalia
- Phylum: Mollusca
- Class: Gastropoda
- Family: Pyramidellidae
- Genus: Syrnola
- Species: S. tincta

Binomial name
- Syrnola tincta Angas, 1871

Species of gastropod

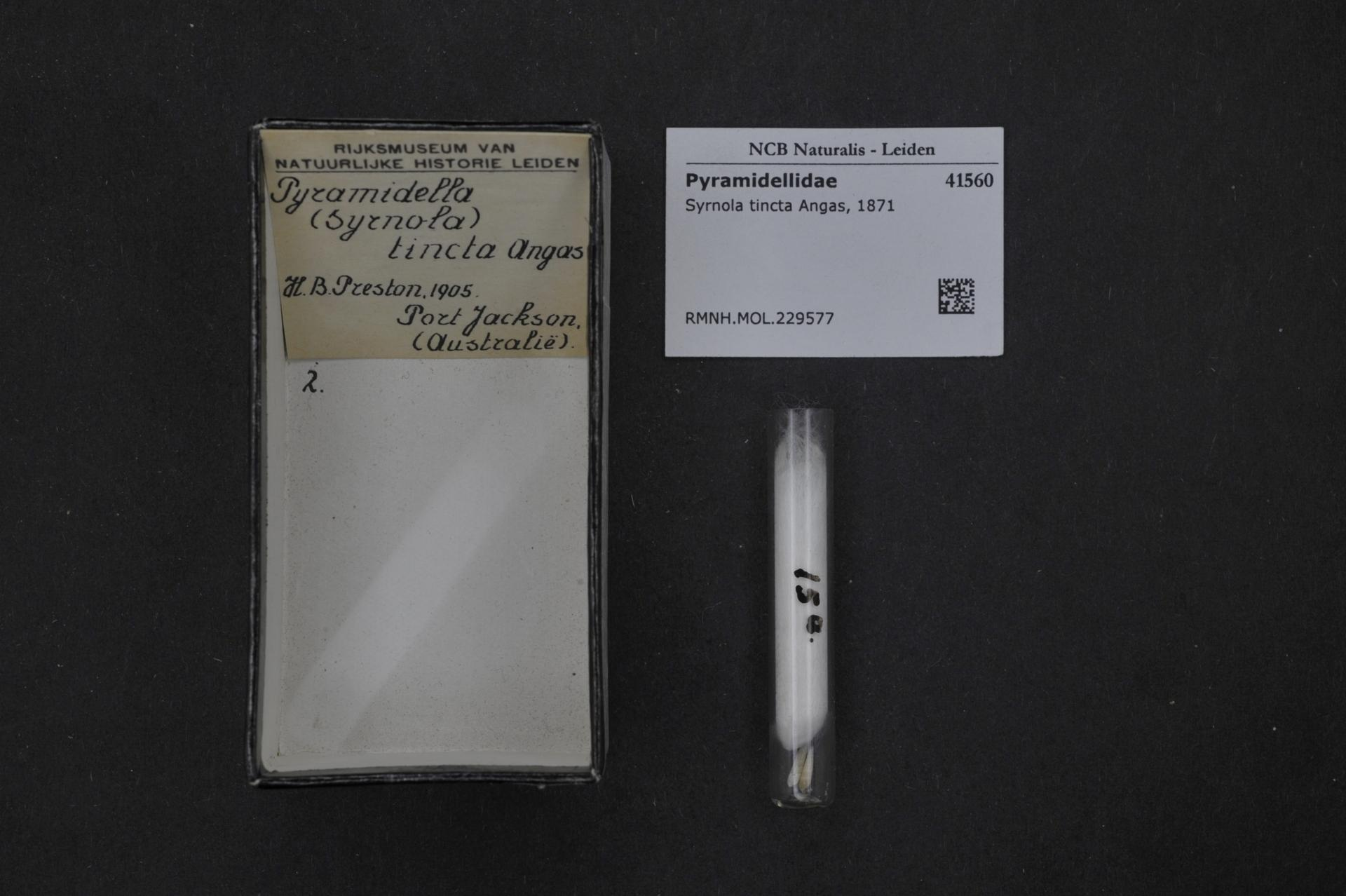

Syrnola tincta, common name the dyed pyramid shell, is a species of sea snail, a marine gastropod mollusk in the family Pyramidellidae, the pyrams and their allies.

== Description ==
The length of the shell of this ectoparasite measures 5 mm.

== Distribution ==
This marine species occurs off New South Wales, Victoria, South Australia, and Tasmania.
