= Syrnola obeliscus =

Scientific classification
- Kingdom: Animalia
- Phylum: Mollusca
- Class: Gastropoda
- Family: Pyramidellidae
- Genus: Syrnola
- Species: S. obeliscus

Binomial name
- Syrnola obeliscus (Garrett, 1873)

Synonyms
- Odostomia obeliscus Garrett, 1873

Species of gastropod

Syrnola obeliscus is a species of sea snail, a marine gastropod mollusk in the family Pyramidellidae, the pyrams and their allies.
