= Syrnola angusta =

Scientific classification
- Kingdom: Animalia
- Phylum: Mollusca
- Class: Gastropoda
- Family: Pyramidellidae
- Genus: Syrnola
- Species: S. angusta

Binomial name
- Syrnola angusta Laseron, 1951

Species of gastropod

Syrnola angusta is a species of sea snail, a marine gastropod mollusk in the family Pyramidellidae, the pyrams and their allies.

== Distribution ==
This marine species occurs off New South Wales, Australia.
