= Syrnola minuta =

Scientific classification
- Kingdom: Animalia
- Phylum: Mollusca
- Class: Gastropoda
- Family: Pyramidellidae
- Genus: Syrnola
- Species: S. minuta

Binomial name
- Syrnola minuta Adams H., 1869

Synonyms
- Eulimella minuta (H. Adams, 1869); Puposyrnola minuta

Species of gastropod

Syrnola minuta is a species of sea snail, a marine gastropod mollusk in the family Pyramidellidae, the pyrams and their allies.

== Distribution ==
This species occurs in the following locations:

- European waters (ERMS scope)
- Portuguese Exclusive Economic Zone
- Spanish Exclusive Economic Zone
