= Syrnola menda =

Scientific classification
- Kingdom: Animalia
- Phylum: Mollusca
- Class: Gastropoda
- Family: Pyramidellidae
- Genus: Syrnola
- Species: S. menda

Binomial name
- Syrnola menda Finlay, 1926

Species of gastropod

Syrnola menda is a species of sea snail, a marine gastropod mollusk in the family Pyramidellidae, the pyrams and their allies.
