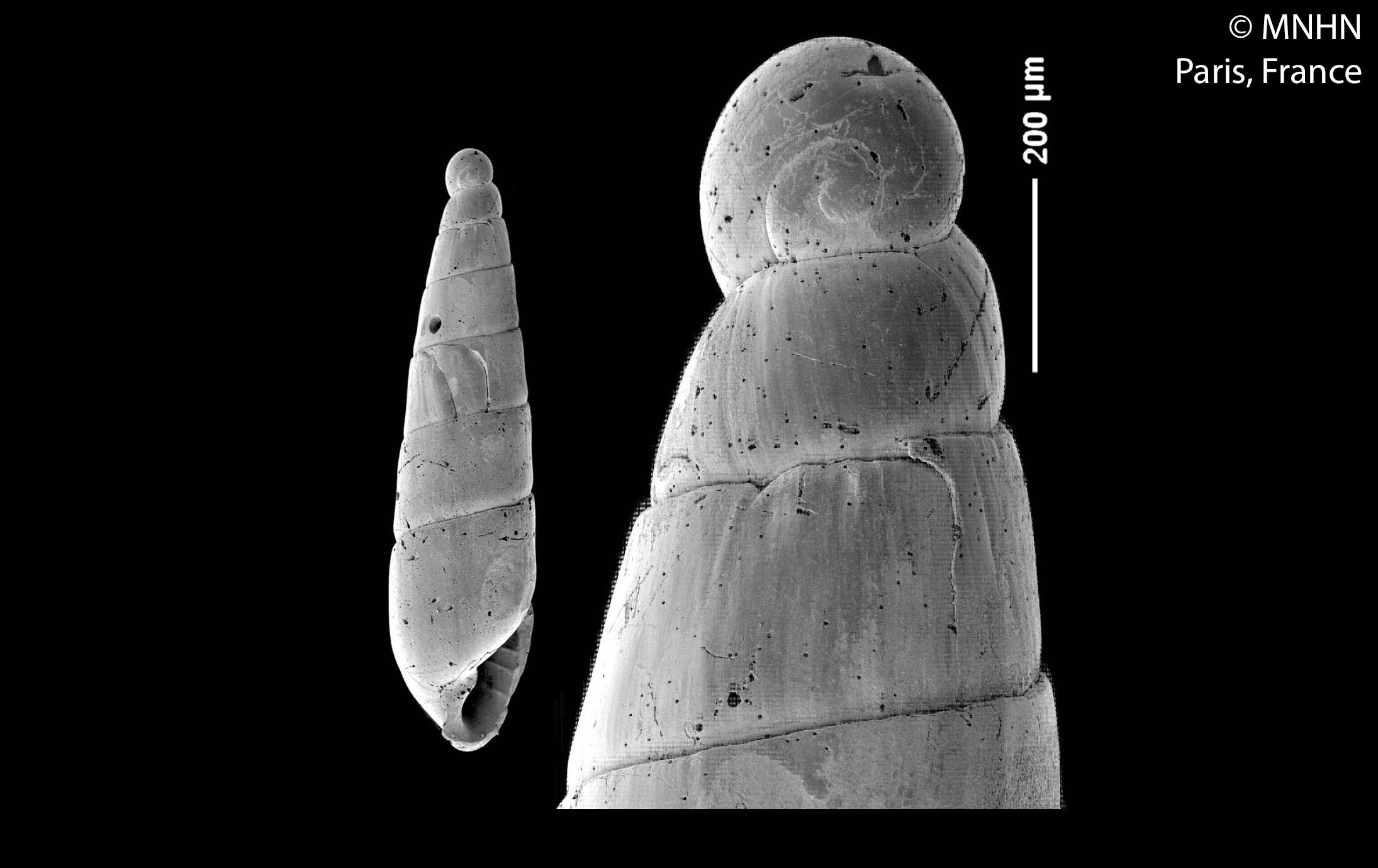
- Shell of Syrnola clavellosa (specimen at MNJHN, Paris)

Scientific classification
- Kingdom: Animalia
- Phylum: Mollusca
- Class: Gastropoda
- Family: Pyramidellidae
- Genus: Syrnola
- Species: S. clavellosa

Binomial name
- Syrnola clavellosa Melvill, 1906

= Syrnola clavellosa =

Species of gastropod

Syrnola clavellosa is a species of sea snail, a marine gastropod mollusk in the family Pyramidellidae, the pyrams and their allies.

== Distribution ==
This marine species occurs off the Solomon Islands.
