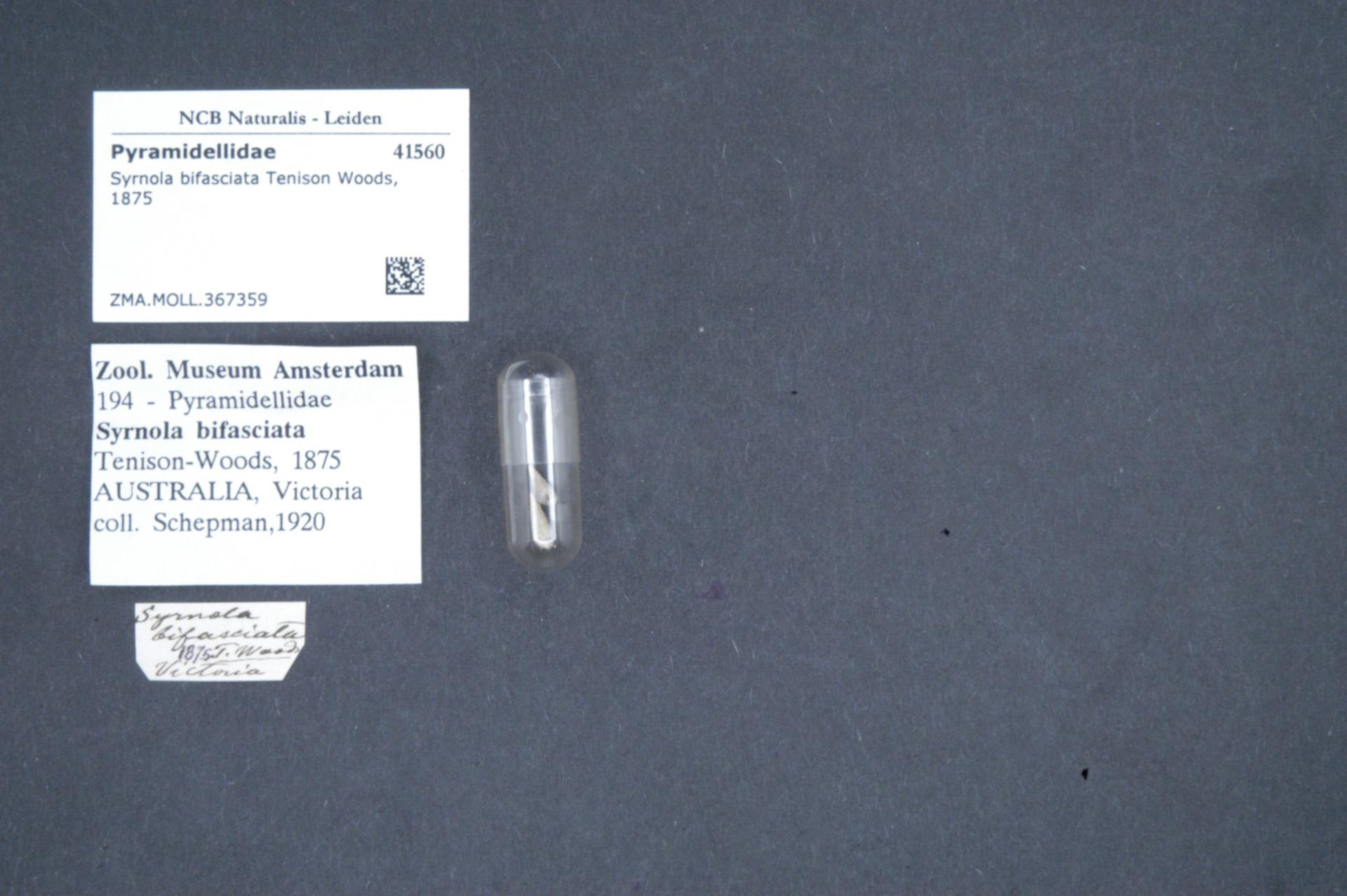

Scientific classification
- Kingdom: Animalia
- Phylum: Mollusca
- Class: Gastropoda
- Family: Pyramidellidae
- Genus: Syrnola
- Species: S. bifasciata

Binomial name
- Syrnola bifasciata Tenison-Woods, 1875

= Syrnola bifasciata =

Two-banded pyramid shell

Species of gastropod

Syrnola bifasciata, common name the two-banded pyramid shell, is a species of sea snail, a marine gastropod mollusk in the family Pyramidellidae, the pyrams and their allies.

== Description ==
The length of the shell measures 6 mm.

== Distribution ==
The type specimen of this marine species was found off Tasmania. It is also endemic to New South Wales and Victoria, Australia.
