= Syrnola collea =

Scientific classification
- Kingdom: Animalia
- Phylum: Mollusca
- Class: Gastropoda
- Family: Pyramidellidae
- Genus: Syrnola
- Species: S. collea

Binomial name
- Syrnola collea (Bartsch, 1926)

Synonyms
- Pyramidella (Syrnola) collea Bartsch, 1926 (basionym)

Species of gastropod

Syrnola collea is a species of sea snail, a marine gastropod mollusk in the family Pyramidellidae, the pyrams and their allies.

== Description ==
The shell is small, bluish-white, and semi-translucent. It has a very irregularly elongate-conic shape. The early whorls are decollated. The four remaining whorls are almost flattened, and appressed at the summit. They are marked by incremental lines only. The sutures are scarcely impressed. The preceding whorl shines through the appressed summit, and the anterior termination of the preceding whorl forms a zone that gives to the shell a false suture effect. The periphery of the body whorl is well rounded. The base of the shell is short, well rounded and smooth. The small aperture is oval. The posterior angle is acute. The outer lip is thickened at the posterior angle and also at the base and slightly so in the middle. It forms therefore a rather conspicuous peristome reinforced within by three strong lamellar folds. The inner lip is stout, reflected over and appressed to the base. The parietal wall is covered by a moderately thick callus.

== Distribution ==
This type specimen of this marine species was found in the Pacific Ocean off Santa Elena Bay, Ecuador.
