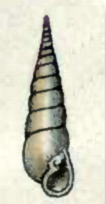
- Drawing of a shell of Syrnola attenuata

Scientific classification
- Kingdom: Animalia
- Phylum: Mollusca
- Class: Gastropoda
- Family: Pyramidellidae
- Genus: Syrnola
- Species: S. attenuata

Binomial name
- Syrnola attenuata (Dall, 1892)

Synonyms
- Pyramidella (Syrnola) attenuata A. Adams

= Syrnola attenuata =

Species of gastropod

Syrnola attenuata is a species of sea snail, a marine gastropod mollusk in the family Pyramidellidae, the pyrams and their allies.

== Description ==
The whitish shell is slender and shining. The length of the shell measures 11.5 mm. It is finely spirally striated. The whorls of the teleoconch are flattened. The suture is profound.

== Distribution ==
This marine species is found off the Philippines.
