= Syrnola crawfordi =

Scientific classification
- Kingdom: Animalia
- Phylum: Mollusca
- Class: Gastropoda
- Family: Pyramidellidae
- Genus: Syrnola
- Species: S. crawfordi

Binomial name
- Syrnola crawfordi Powell, 1927

Species of gastropod

Syrnola crawfordi is a species of sea snail, a marine gastropod mollusk in the family Pyramidellidae, the pyrams and their allies.
