= Syrnola subcinctella =

Scientific classification
- Kingdom: Animalia
- Phylum: Mollusca
- Class: Gastropoda
- Family: Pyramidellidae
- Genus: Syrnola
- Species: S. subcinctella

Binomial name
- Syrnola subcinctella Nomura, 1936

Species of gastropod

Syrnola subcinctella is a species of sea snail, a marine gastropod mollusc in the family Pyramidellidae, the pyrams and their allies.

== Description ==
The length of the shell varies between 6mm and 20 mm.

== Distribution ==
This species occurs in the Pacific Ocean off the Philippines.
