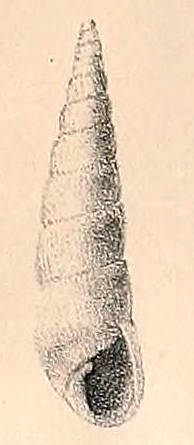
- Drawing of a shell of Styloptygma jaculum

Scientific classification
- Kingdom: Animalia
- Phylum: Mollusca
- Class: Gastropoda
- Family: Pyramidellidae
- Genus: Styloptygma
- Species: S. jaculum

Binomial name
- Styloptygma jaculum (Melvill & Standen, 1896)

Synonyms
- Syrnola (Styloptygma) jaculum (Melvill, J.C. & R. Standen, 1896, "1897"); Syrnola jaculum Melvill & Standen, 1896

= Styloptygma jaculum =

Species of gastropod

Styloptygma jaculum is a species of sea snail, a marine gastropod mollusk in the family Pyramidellidae, the pyrams and their allies.

== Description ==
The white sharp-pointed shell has a length of 8 mm. The teleoconch contains 11 straight and smooth whorls. These a very slightly channeled at the sutures. The aperture is oblique. The outer lip is simple; The columella is once plaited.

== Distribution ==
This species occurs in the Pacific Ocean off the Loyalty Islands.
