= Odostomia lorioli =

Scientific classification
- Kingdom: Animalia
- Phylum: Mollusca
- Class: Gastropoda
- Family: Pyramidellidae
- Genus: Odostomia
- Species: O. lorioli

Binomial name
- Odostomia lorioli (Hornung & Mermod, 1924)

Species of gastropod

Odostomia lorioli is a species of sea snail, a marine gastropod mollusc in the family Pyramidellidae, the pyrams and their allies.

== Description ==
The shell grows to a length of 2 mm.

== Distribution ==
This species occurs in the following locations:

- Mediterranean Sea as an invasive species
