= Finlayola lurida =

Scientific classification
- Kingdom: Animalia
- Phylum: Mollusca
- Class: Gastropoda
- Superfamily: Pyramidelloidea
- Family: Pyramidellidae
- Genus: Finlayola
- Species: F. lurida

Binomial name
- Finlayola lurida (Suter, 1908)

Synonyms
- Pyramidella (Syrnola) lurida Suter, 1908; Syrnola lurida (Suter, 1908) ·

Species of gastropod

Finlayola lurida is a species of sea snail, a marine gastropod mollusk in the family Pyramidellidae, the pyrams and their allies.

== Distribution ==
This marine species is endemic to New Zealand.
