= Styloptygma lacteolum =

Scientific classification
- Kingdom: Animalia
- Phylum: Mollusca
- Class: Gastropoda
- Family: Pyramidellidae
- Genus: Styloptygma
- Species: S. lacteolum

Binomial name
- Styloptygma lacteolum Preston, 1903

Synonyms
- Styloptygma lacteola [sic] (incorrect gender ending); Syrnola (Styloptygma) lacteola (Preston, 1904); Turbonilla (Evaletta) elizabethae Pilsbry, 1918; Turbonilla (Evaletta) laysanensis Pilsbry, 1918

Species of gastropod

Styloptygma lacteolum is a species of sea snail, a marine gastropod mollusk in the family Pyramidellidae, the pyrams and their allies.

== Distribution ==
This marine species occurs off Sri Lanka and Hawaii.
