= Odostomia andamanensis =

Scientific classification
- Kingdom: Animalia
- Phylum: Mollusca
- Class: Gastropoda
- Family: Pyramidellidae
- Genus: Odostomia
- Species: O. andamanensis

Binomial name
- Odostomia andamanensis (Preston, 1908)

Synonyms
- Styloptygma andamanensis Preston, 1908 (original combination)

Species of gastropod

Odostomia andamanensis is a species of sea snail, a marine gastropod mollusc in the family Pyramidellidae, the pyrams and their allies.

== Description ==
The length of the shell attains 6.75 mm, its diameter 1.75 mm.

(Original description) The subulate shell is greyish white, painted with an indistinct whitish, infra-sutural, spiral band, semi-transparent. The 10 whorls are marked with transverse lines of growth. The sutures are impressed. The aperture is elongately oval. The columella is posteriorly plicate.

== Distribution ==
This marine species occurs off the Andaman and Nicobar Islands
