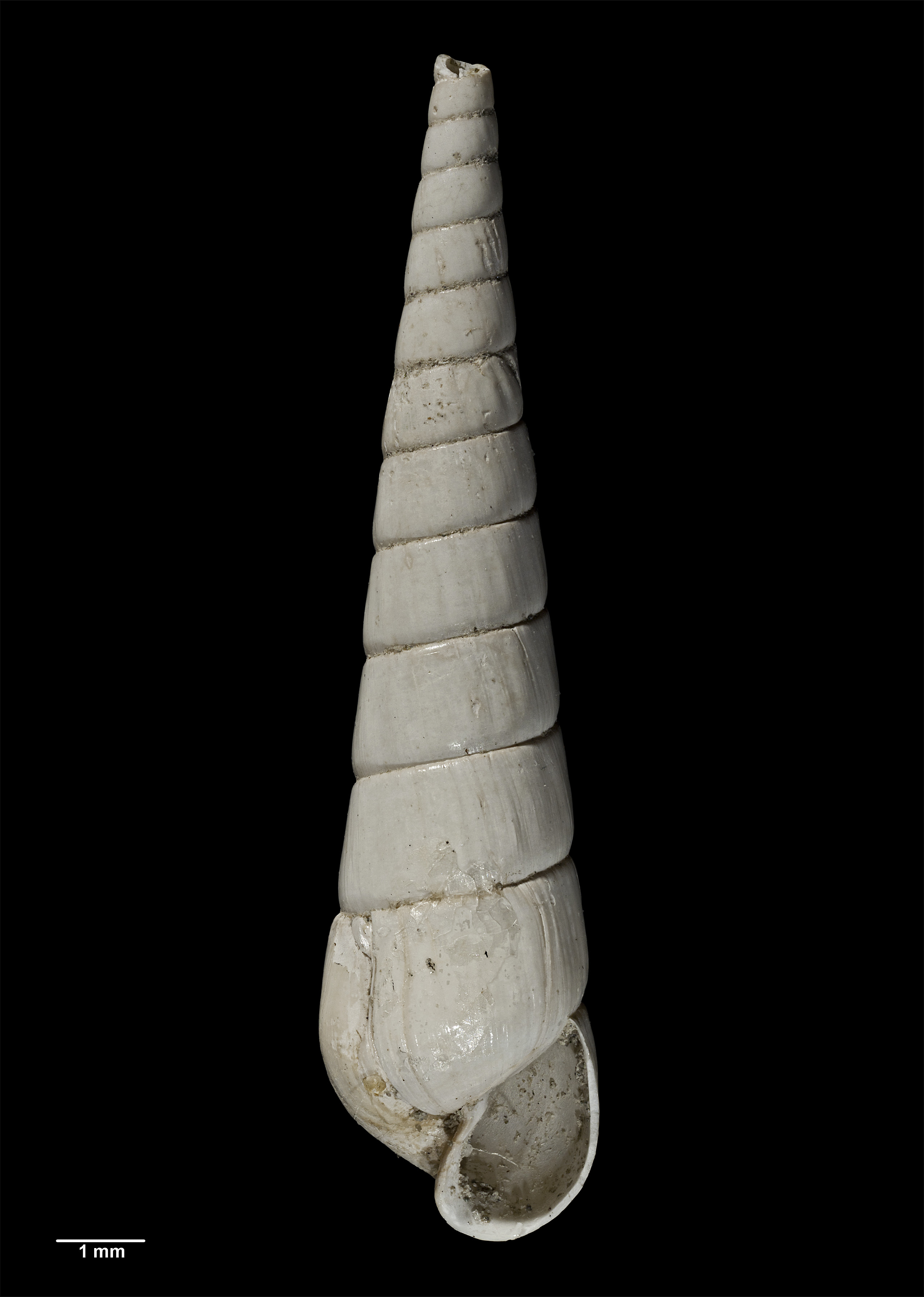
- Holotype from Auckland War Memorial Museum

Scientific classification
- Kingdom: Animalia
- Phylum: Mollusca
- Class: Gastropoda
- Family: Pyramidellidae
- Genus: Tibersyrnola
- Species: †T. lawsi

Binomial name
- †Tibersyrnola lawsi (A. W. B. Powell, 1934)

Synonyms
- Syrnola lawsi A. W. B. Powell, 1934

= Tibersyrnola lawsi =

Tibersyrnola lawsi Temporal range: Late Pleistocene

Extinct species of gastropod

Tibersyrnola lawsi is an extinct species of sea snail, a marine gastropod mollusc, in the family Columbellidae, the dove snails. Fossils of the species date to the Late Pleistocene, and occur in the strata of Te Piki in the eastern Bay of Plenty, New Zealand.

== Description ==
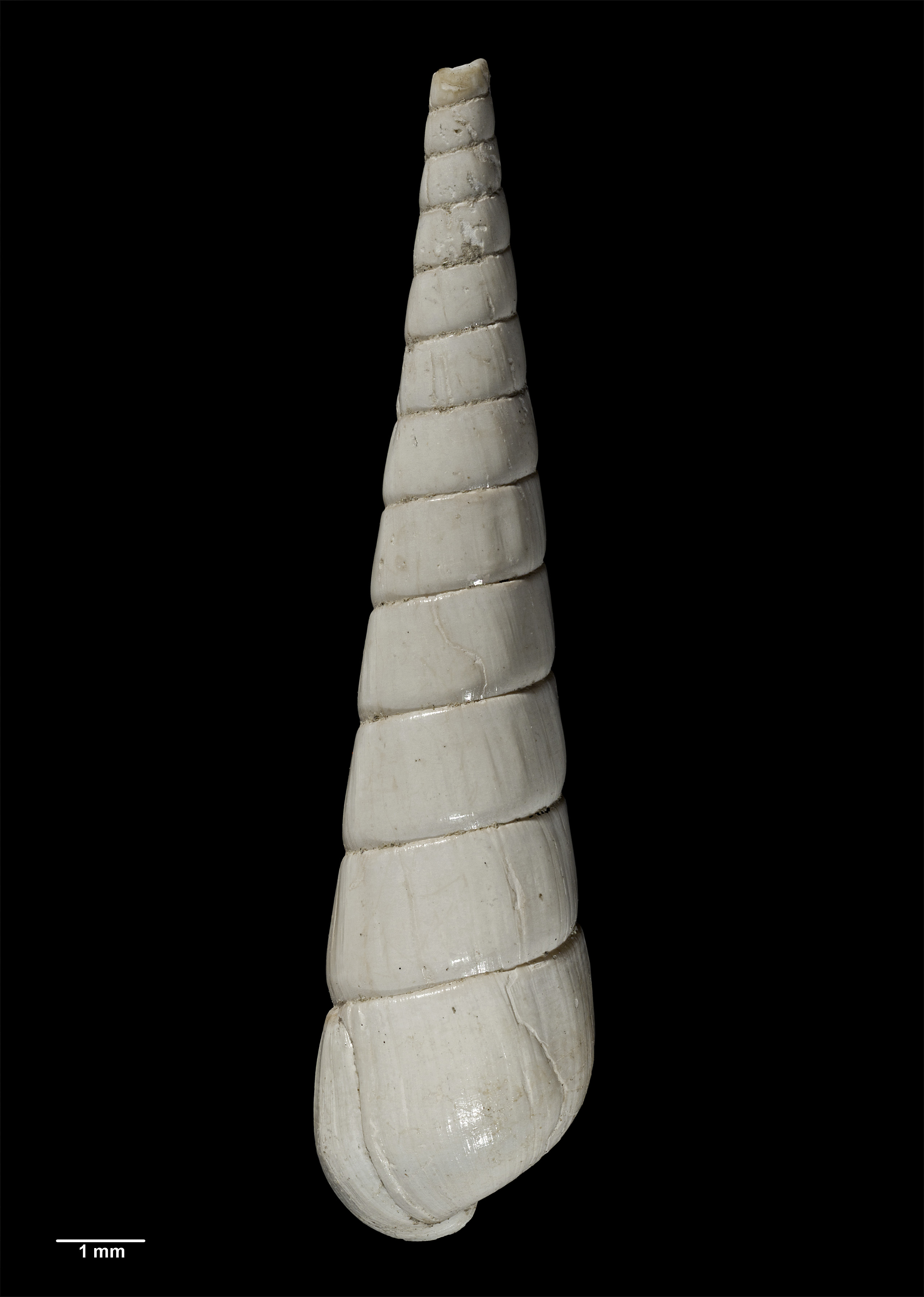
Reverse view of holotype

In the original description, Powell described the species as follows:

Shell very large for the genus, subulate, smooth and polished. Whorls numerous. 11½ showing in the more complete specimen, but probably at least one whorl and the protoconch are missing. Height of each whorl of the spire about half the diameter. Spire very tall, straight sided and about five and one-third times height of aperture. Suture slightly indented, not margined. Surface highly polished, but with dense spiral striae barely visible even under a high magnification. Body-whorl higher than broad, and rounded at periphery. Aperture subrhomboid. Columella oblique, straight, with a weak fold situated very high up, slightly expanded, and free from the base, resulting in a small umbilical chink. Outer-lip sharp, rather straight above and narrowly rounded basally.

The holotype of the species measures 13.5 mm (0.53 in) in height (estimated height of the unbroken shell 14.5 mm (0.57 in)), and 3.4 mm (0.13 in) in diameter, however many specimens are known to be larger, including one that is 20.5 mm (0.81 in) in height and 4.3 mm (0.17 in) in diameter.

The species has a prominent heterostropic protoconch of 2.333 whorls, which is coiled in a low helicoid, and has a small lateral nucleus that is centrally placed.

== Taxonomy ==
The species was first described by A.W.B. Powell in 1934, using the name Syrnola lawsi. The species was recombined in 1937 by C. R. Laws, who moved the species to the genus Tibersyrnola, due to the presence of an internally lirated lip. The holotype was collected by Powell in August 1933 from 6 km (3.7 mi) east of Cape Runaway in the Bay of Plenty Region, and is held by the Auckland War Memorial Museum. Fossils of the species have continued to be found in the vicinity of Cape Runaway.

== Distribution ==
This extinct marine species dates to the Late Pleistocene (Haweran), and is only known to occur in the strata of the Waipaoa Formation (Te Piki Member), in the eastern Bay of Plenty, New Zealand.
