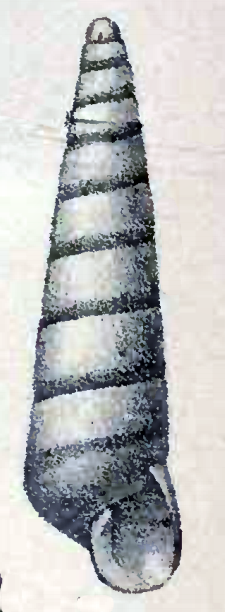
- Drawing of a shell of Tibersyrnola unifasciata

Scientific classification
- Kingdom: Animalia
- Phylum: Mollusca
- Class: Gastropoda
- Family: Pyramidellidae
- Genus: Tibersyrnola
- Species: T. unifasciata

Binomial name
- Tibersyrnola unifasciata (Forbes, 1844)

Synonyms
- Eulima unifasciata Forbes, 1844 (original combination); Eulimella unifasciata van Aartsen, 1994; Odostomia crassa Jeffreys, 1884 (invalid: junior homonym of Odostomia crassa Thompson, 1845; Syrnola wenzi is a replacement name); Odostomia unifasciata (Forbes, 1844); Pyramidella unifasciata (Forbes, 1844); Syrnola cincta Fenaux, 1942 (dubious synonym); Syrnola unifasciata (Forbes, 1844); Syrnola wenzi F. Nordsieck, 1972; Turbonilla unifasciata (Forbes, 1844)

= Tibersyrnola unifasciata =

Species of gastropod

Tibersyrnola unifasciata is a species of sea snail, a marine gastropod mollusk in the family Pyramidellidae, the pyrams and their allies.

THe synonym Syrnola wenzi was named after Wilhelm August Wenz (1886-1945), a German malacologist.

== Description ==
The shell is smooth and polished. It is white, with a median, narrow, light chestnut band. The teleoconch contains 11 flattened whorls. The length of the shell varies between 3 mm and 6.5 mm.

== Distribution ==
This marine species occurs in rather deep water (200m - 700m) in the following locations:

- European waters (ERMS scope)
- Mediterranean Sea : Sicily, Greece
- Greek Exclusive Economic Zone
- Portuguese Exclusive Economic Zone (the Azores)
- Spanish Exclusive Economic Zone
- United Kingdom Exclusive Economic Zone
- Canary Islands
- Atlantic Ocean off Mauritania

== Notes ==
Additional information regarding this species:

- Habitat: Known from seamounts and knolls
