= Syrnola lendix =

Scientific classification
- Kingdom: Animalia
- Phylum: Mollusca
- Class: Gastropoda
- Family: Pyramidellidae
- Genus: Syrnola
- Species: S. lendix

Binomial name
- Syrnola lendix (A. Adams, 1863)

Synonyms
- Styloptygma lendix Adams A. 1863 (basionym)

Species of gastropod

Syrnola lendix is a species of sea snail, a marine gastropod mollusk in the family Pyramidellidae, the pyrams and their allies.

== Distribution ==
This species occurs in the Mediterranean Sea (as an Indo-Pacific migrant)
