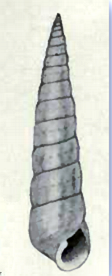
- Drawing of a shell of Tibersyrnola bacillum

Scientific classification
- Kingdom: Animalia
- Phylum: Mollusca
- Class: Gastropoda
- Family: Pyramidellidae
- Genus: Tibersyrnola
- Species: T. bacillum

Binomial name
- Tibersyrnola bacillum (Pilsbry, 1901)

Synonyms
- Syrnola bacillum Pilsbry, 1901

= Tibersyrnola bacillum =

Species of gastropod

Tibersyrnola bacillum is a species of sea snail, a marine gastropod mollusk in the family Pyramidellidae, the pyrams and their allies.

== Description ==
The length of the shell varies between 5.5 mm and 12 mm. The slender shell has a rod-like shape. It has a particular type of coloration. It is marbled reddish-brown and white, with a narrow band of alternate brown and white spots revolving midway between sutures and on the middle of the upper surface of the body whorl, which has a white peripheral belt. This coloring is sometimes very faint. The whorl of the protoconch stands obliquely on edge, the very short spire inclined downward. The 12½ or 13 subsequent whorls of the teleoconch are flat, and separated by deeply cut sutures. They are sculptured with faint growth lines and an impressed line revolving below the suture. Some very faint spirals show elsewhere in certain lights. The periphery is rounded. The base of the shell is convex and subperforate. The aperture is small and narrowly ovate. The columella bears a single strong fold.

== Distribution ==
This marine species occurs in the Pacific Ocean off Japan and the Philippines.
