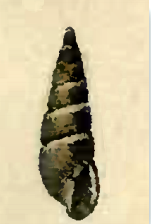
- Drawing of a shell of Syrnola aurantiaca

Scientific classification
- Kingdom: Animalia
- Phylum: Mollusca
- Class: Gastropoda
- Family: Pyramidellidae
- Genus: Syrnola
- Species: S. aurantiaca

Binomial name
- Syrnola aurantiaca Angas, 1867

Synonyms
- Eulima aurantia Petterd, 1884; Pyramidella (Styloptygma) aurantiaca Angas, 1867; Styloptygma aurantiaca Angas, 1867 (original combination); Syrnola aurantia (Petterd, 1884) · unaccepted(junior synonym); Syrnola lata Laseron, 1951 (junior synonym)

= Syrnola aurantiaca =

Species of gastropod

Syrnola aurantiaca is a species of sea snail, a marine gastropod mollusk in the family Pyramidellidae, the pyrams and their allies.

== Description ==
The rather thin, shining shell has a fulvous orange color, with a pale band at the suture. It is darker on the lower whorls, fading into white towards the apex. Its length measures 6 mm. The teleoconch contains eight whorls that are finely transversely striated. The fold of the lip is very small and rudimentary.

== Distribution ==
This marine species occurs off New South Wales, Australia. The type specimen was found off Port Jackson.
