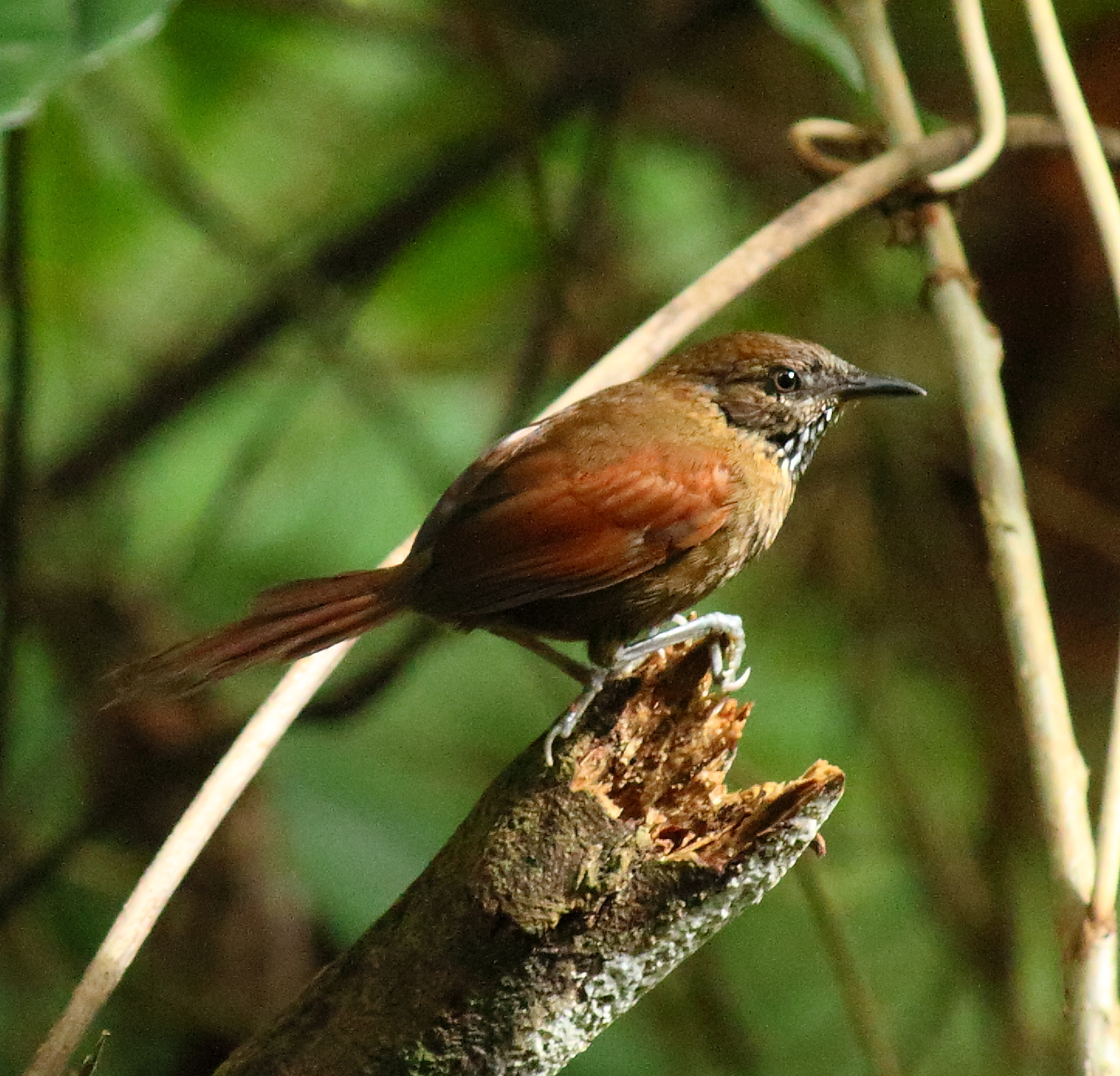

Conservation status
- Least Concern (IUCN 3.1)

Scientific classification
- Kingdom: Animalia
- Phylum: Chordata
- Class: Aves
- Order: Passeriformes
- Family: Furnariidae
- Genus: Synallaxis
- Species: S. cinnamomea

Binomial name
- Synallaxis cinnamomea Lafresnaye, 1843

= Stripe-breasted spinetail =

Species of bird

The stripe-breasted spinetail (Synallaxis cinnamomea) is a passerine bird in the Furnariinae subfamily of the ovenbird family Furnariidae. It is found in Colombia, Trinidad, Tobago, and Venezuela.

== Taxonomy and systematics ==
The stripe-breasted spinetail has these seven subspecies:

- S. c. carri Chapman, 1895
- S. c. terrestris Jardine, 1847
- S. c. cinnamomea Lafresnaye, 1843
- S. c. aveledoi Phelps, WH & Phelps, WH Jr, 1946
- S. c. bolivari Hartert, EJO, 1917
- S. c. striatipectus Chapman, 1899
- S. c. pariae Phelps, WH & Phelps, WH Jr, 1949

The stripe-breasted spinetail is closely related to the ruddy spinetail (S. rutilans) and chestnut-throated spinetail (S. cherriei).

== Description ==
The stripe-breasted spinetail is 14 to 16 cm (5.5 to 6.3 in) long and weighs 15 to 23 g (0.53 to 0.81 oz). It has one of the shortest tails of genus Synallaxis. The sexes have the same plumage. Adults of the nominate subspecies S. c. cinnamomea have a faint pale supercilium on an otherwise dull rufous face. Their crown, nape, back, rump, and uppertail coverts are rich brown. Their wings are rufous-chestnut with blackish tips on their flight feathers. Their tail is rich brown; it is graduated and the ends of the feathers lack barbs giving a spiny appearance. Their throat is streaked black on white. Their underparts are rufous with fulvous streaks (unique in Synallaxis); the belly is paler than the rest with duller streaks. Their iris is reddish to creamy brown to dark brown, their maxilla dark horn to black, their mandible gray-horn or pinkish with a dark horn tip, and their legs and feet black to grayish to pale gray-brown. Juveniles are browner than adults, with a less distinct and less black throat and less distinct streaks on the underparts.

The other subspecies of the stripe-breasted spinetail differ from the nominate and each other thus:

- S. c. carri: dark brown upperparts, no supercilium, throat with more black than white, and dull olive-brown underparts with faint streaks
- S. c. terrestris: palest of all subspecies, more olivaceous brown upperparts, unstreaked underparts except for blurry ones on the breast
- S. c. aveledoi: paler and more yellowish brown upperparts and buff with dusky streaked underparts
- S. c. bolivari: more olivaceous upperparts, unmarked whitish chin, whitish throat with wavy black streaks, breast and sides light buffy cinnamon with blackish streaks, buffy whitish belly with less obvious streaks, and brownish flanks and undertail coverts with faint streaks
- S. c. striatipectus: darker upperparts, chestnut wings and tail, obvious buff supercilium on an ochraceous face, and ochraceous underparts with heavy black streaks
- S. c. pariae: similar to striatipectus but with less obvious supercilium and duller and more olivaceous (rather than blackish) streaks on the underparts

The dramatic plumage differences between the nominate and bolivari hint that the latter might be a separate species; "further work needed".

== Distribution and habitat ==
The stripe-breasted spinetail has a disjunct distribution. The subspecies are found thus:

- S. c. carri: Trinidad
- S. c. terrestris: Tobago
- S. c. cinnamomea: Serranía del Perijá on the Venezuela/Colombia border and Colombia's Eastern Andes in Magdalena Department and between Santander and Cundinamarca departments
- S. c. aveledoi: Andes of western Venezuela from Falcón state south to northern Táchira state and into Colombia's Norte de Santander Department
- S. c. bolivari: the Venezuelan Coastal Range from Yaracuy state east to Miranda and northern Guárico states
- S. c. striatipectus: northeastern Venezuela's Sucre and Anzoátegui states
- S. c. pariae: the Paria Peninsula in northeastern Venezuela

On the South American mainland the stripe-breasted spinetail inhabits a variety of landscapes, primarily subtropical and tropical deciduous forest, gallery forest, and arid montane and second-growth scrublands. It also inhabits undergrowth in the interior and edges of tropical lowland and lower montane forest, and locally occurs in second-growth woodlands and overgrown coffee plantations. On Trinidad and Tobago it primarily inhabits the undergrowth of forests. In elevation it ranges between 800 and 3,100 m (2,600 and 10,200 ft) in Colombia and between 700 and 2,000 m (2,300 and 6,600 ft) in Venezuela.

== Behavior ==
=== Movement ===
The stripe-breasted spinetail is a year-round resident throughout its range.

=== Feeding ===
The stripe-breasted spinetail feeds on arthropods. It typically forages in pairs and occasionally joins mixed-species feeding flocks. It gleans prey from foliage and branches up to about 2 m (7 ft) above the ground, and on the ground explores leaf litter for prey.

=== Breeding ===
The stripe-breasted spinetail breeds at any time of the year on Trinidad and at a minimum between March and August on Tobago; its breeding season in Colombia and Venezuela are not known. Though it is a member of the ovenbird family, which is named for the clay nests many species make, the stripe-breasted spinetail constructs a globe of sticks and leaves with an entrance tunnel on top. It can be placed on sloping ground or in a bush up to about 3 m (10 ft) above the ground. The clutch size is three eggs. The incubation period, time to fledging, and details of parental care are not known.

=== Vocalization ===
The stripe-breasted spinetail's song is two notes, of which the second is lower but rising, " a nasal, sharp 'chík-kweek' or 'chúrt-wert' " that is often repeated for long periods. Its calls are a "soft, whining 'peeeur' or querulous 'chew' ".

== Status ==
The IUCN has assessed the stripe-breasted spinetail as being of Least Concern. It has a large range and though its population size is not known it is believed to be stable. No immediate threats have been identified. It is considered fairly common in Colombia, common on Trinidad and Tobago, very common on the Paria Peninsula, and local in the Venezuelan Andes. It occurs in several protected areas and "[t]hrives in forested areas opened by cutting".
