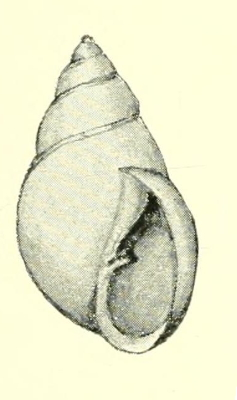
- Shell of Odostomia metcalfei (holotype)

Scientific classification
- Kingdom: Animalia
- Phylum: Mollusca
- Class: Gastropoda
- Family: Pyramidellidae
- Genus: Odostomia
- Species: O. metcalfei

Binomial name
- Odostomia metcalfei Pritchard & Gatliff, 1900

Synonyms
- Agatha metcalfei (Pritchard & Gatliff, 1900); Syrnola metcalfei (Pritchard & Gatliff, 1900)

= Odostomia metcalfei =

Metcalfe's pyramid shell

Species of gastropod

Odostomia metcalfei, common name Metcalfe's pyramid shell, is a species of sea snail, a marine gastropod mollusk in the family Pyramidellidae, the pyrams and their allies.

== Description ==
The length of the shell reaches 2.5 mm, its diameter about 1.25 mm; the aperture measures 1 mm in length.

(Original description) The shell is small and biconic, with a spire that extends longer than the aperture and culminates in a somewhat obtuse apex. The heterostrophic embryo comprises about one and a half whorls, with an immersed tip; the extremely obtuse apical portion is markedly smaller than the succeeding whorl, so that in lateral view it presents a distinct, broad tabulation at this part of the shell.

The shell contains three to four somewhat convex whorls, separated by a distinct suture. Just below and running parallel to this suture lies a narrow margin, and there is a slight tendency toward tabulation along the suture. The whorls are faintly marked with longitudinal striations, while the shell itself remains thin, translucent, and milky white in colour.

The aperture is ovate and slightly effuse anteriorly. On the columellar side, at about the middle of the aperture, there is a single strong, tooth-like plait, and the outer lip is thin.

== Distribution ==
This marine species is endemic to Australia and occurs subtidally off Victoria, South Australia, and Tasmania.
