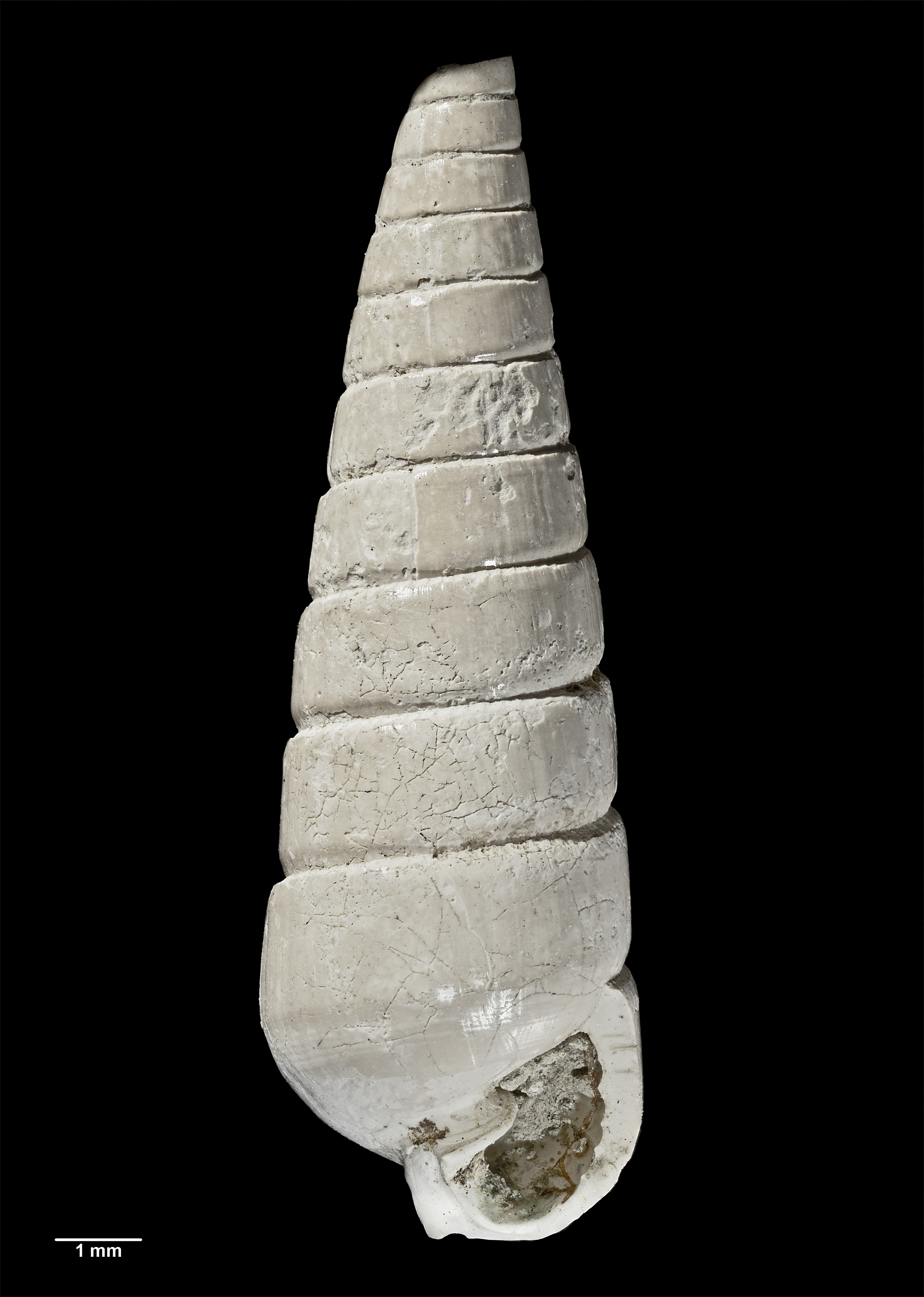
- Holotype from Auckland War Memorial Museum

Scientific classification
- Kingdom: Animalia
- Phylum: Mollusca
- Class: Gastropoda
- Family: Pyramidellidae
- Genus: Tibersyrnola
- Species: †T. tepikiensis

Binomial name
- †Tibersyrnola tepikiensis (A. W. B. Powell, 1934)

Synonyms
- Syrnola tepikiensis A. W. B. Powell, 1934

= Tibersyrnola tepikiensis =

Tibersyrnola tepikiensis Temporal range: Late Pleistocene

Extinct species of gastropod

Tibersyrnola tepikiensis is an extinct species of sea snail, a marine gastropod mollusc, in the family Columbellidae, the dove snails. Fossils of the species date to the Late Pleistocene, and occur in the strata of Te Piki in the eastern Bay of Plenty, New Zealand.

== Description ==
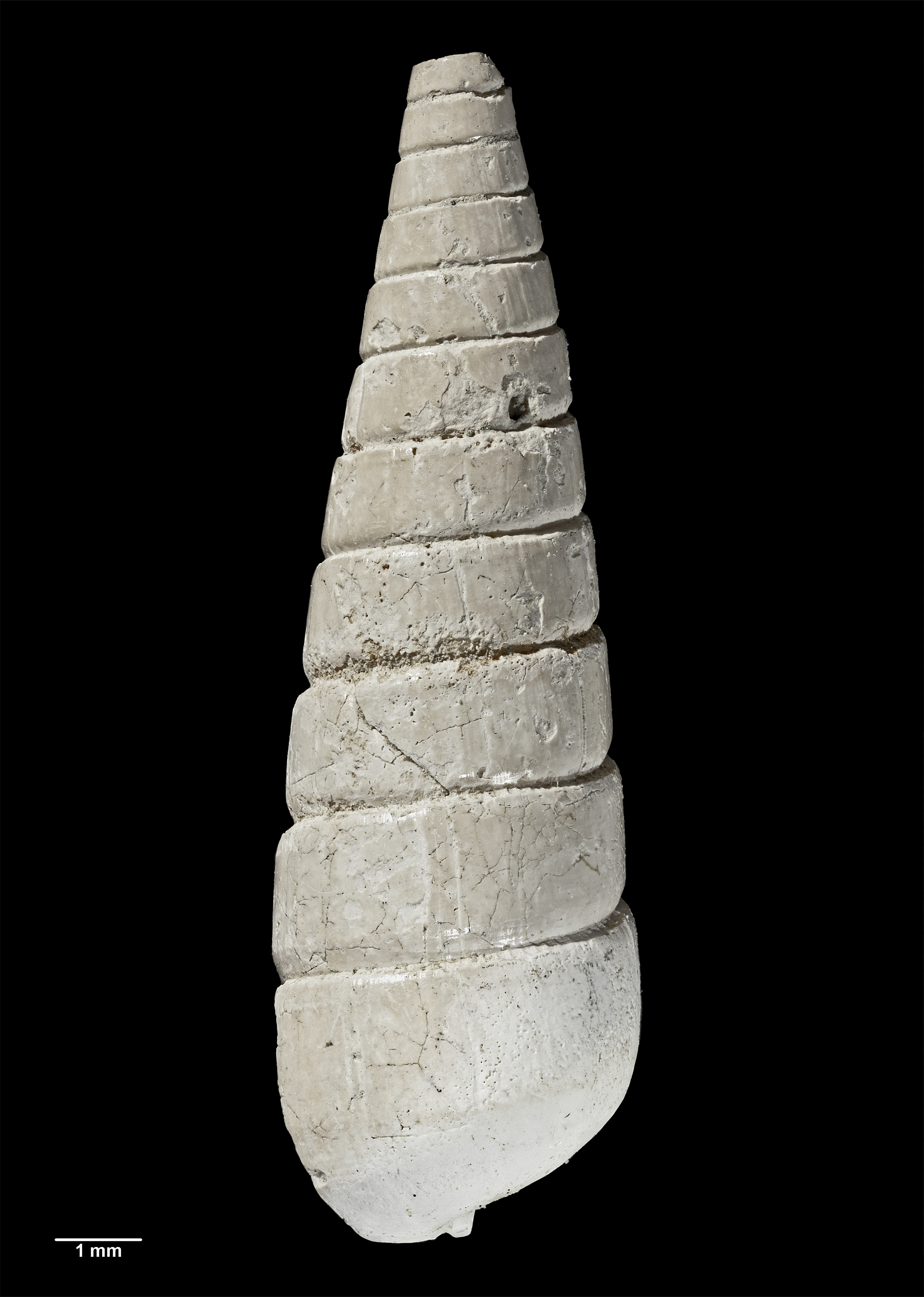
Reverse view of holotype

In the original description, Powell described the species as follows:

Shell very large for the genus, subulate, smooth and polished except for a few faint subperipheral spiral striations. Whorls numerous, ten and one-third showing in the holotype, which has the protoconch and several post-nuclear whorls missing. Height of each whorl of the spire about one fourth the diameter. Spire very tall, straight sided, except for deeply impressed V-shaped bevel-sided sutures. The body-whorl is rounded except for the very slight sutural bevel. The aperture is slightly damaged, but is shown to be small, with six sharp spiral ridges upon the inside of the outer lip. Columella vertical, very massive, with a strong plait at the upper two thirds of its height.

The holotype of the species measures 13.6 mm (0.54 in) in height (estimated height of the unbroken shell 15.5 mm (0.61 in)), and 4.5 mm (0.18 in) in diameter. The species has microscopic growth lines, spiral striae, and numerous, fine, subperipheral spirals, which were not noted by Powell. Powell felt that Tibersyrnola semiconcava was closely related to the species, but differs due to lower and broader whorl proportions in T. tepikiensis.

== Taxonomy ==
The species was first described by A.W.B. Powell in 1934, using the name Syrnola tepikiensis. The species was recombined in 1937 by C. R. Laws, who moved the species to the genus Tibersyrnola, due to heavy lirations in the outer lip. The holotype was collected by Powell in August 1933 from 6 km (3.7 mi) east of Cape Runaway in the Bay of Plenty Region, and is held by the Auckland War Memorial Museum. Fossils of the species have continued to be found in the vicinity of Cape Runaway.

== Distribution ==
This extinct marine species dates to the Late Pleistocene (Haweran), and is only known to occur in the strata of the Waipaoa Formation (Te Piki Member), in the eastern Bay of Plenty, New Zealand.
