= Styloptygma luteum =

Scientific classification
- Kingdom: Animalia
- Phylum: Mollusca
- Class: Gastropoda
- Family: Pyramidellidae
- Genus: Styloptygma
- Species: S. luteum

Binomial name
- Styloptygma luteum (Garrett, 1873)

Synonyms
- Odostomia lutea Garrett, 1873; Odostomia rufula Souverbie, 1875; Styloptygma lutea [sic] (incorrect gender ending); Syrnola mossiana Melvill & Standen, 1895

Species of gastropod

Styloptygma luteum is a species of sea snail, a marine gastropod mollusk in the family Pyramidellidae, the pyrams and their allies.

== Description ==
The size of the shell attains 5 mm.

== Distribution ==
This marine species occurs off New Caledonia.
