= Tibersyrnola serotina =

Scientific classification
- Kingdom: Animalia
- Phylum: Mollusca
- Class: Gastropoda
- Family: Pyramidellidae
- Genus: Tibersyrnola
- Species: T. serotina

Binomial name
- Tibersyrnola serotina (A. Adams, 1863)

Synonyms
- Styloptygma serotina [sic] (incorrect gender ending); Styloptygma serotinum (A. Adams, 1863); Syrnola serotina A. Adams, 1863 (original combination)

Species of gastropod

Tibersyrnola serotina is a species of sea snail, a marine gastropod mollusk in the family Pyramidellidae, the pyrams and their allies.

== Habitat ==
This species is found in the following habitats:

- Brackish
- Marine
