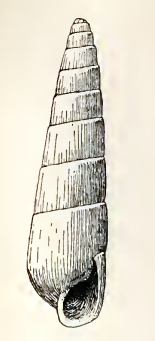
- Apertural view of a shell of Tibersyrnola cinnamomea

Scientific classification
- Kingdom: Animalia
- Phylum: Mollusca
- Class: Gastropoda
- Family: Pyramidellidae
- Genus: Tibersyrnola
- Species: T. cinnamomea

Binomial name
- Tibersyrnola cinnamomea (A. Adams, 1862)

Synonyms
- Elusa cinnamonea A. Adams, 1862 (basionym); Syrnola cinnamomea (A. Adams, 1863)

= Tibersyrnola cinnamomea =

Species of gastropod

Tibersyrnola cinnamomea is a species of sea snail, a marine gastropod mollusk in the family Pyramidellidae, the pyrams and their allies.

== Description ==
The slender, yellowish-brown shell has an elongate-conic shape. Its outline is almost rectilinear. It has a polished appearance. The length of the shell measures 4.2 mm. The 2½ whorls of the protoconch are smooth, rather large, helicoid, and moderately elevated. Their axis is at a right angle to the axis of the later whorls and about one-fourth immersed in the first of them. The periphery of the protoconch extends slightly beyond the outline of the spire on the left side. The eight whorls of the teleoconch are flattened and quite high between the sutures. They are separated by slight sutures marked only by faint lines of growth and numerous extremely fine and closely placed spiral striations. The periphery and the base of the body whorl is well rounded, the latter rather short. The aperture is small, and suboval. The posterior angle is narrow and acute. The outer li is thin. The columella is short, curved, and moderately strong. It is marked by an inconspicuous oblique fold near its insertion. The parietal wall is covered by a thin callus.

== Distribution ==
This marine species occurs off Japan.
