= Cingulinini =

Scientific classification
- Kingdom: Animalia
- Phylum: Mollusca
- Class: Gastropoda
- Family: Pyramidellidae
- Subfamily: Turbonillinae
- Tribe: Cingulinini; Saurin, 1959

Genera
- See text.

Tribe of gastropods

Cingulinini is a taxonomic tribe of very small sea snails, marine gastropod mollusks in the family Pyramidellidae, the pyrams and their allies.

== Taxonomy ==
Cingulininae was first introduced by Saurin in 1959, and according to Schander, Van Aartsen & Corgan (1999) it comprises seven genera; Cingulina, Cinctigua, Coemansia, Paracingulina, Polyspirella, Pseudocingulina and Puncticingulina.

As Cingulininae it has been one of eleven recognized subfamilies of the gastropod family Pyramidellidae (according to the taxonomy of Ponder & Lindberg, 1997), the pyrams and their allies. The other 10 subfamilies are Odostomiinae, Turbonillinae, Chrysallidinae, Cyclostremellinae, Sayellinae, Syrnolinae, Eulimellinae, Pyramidellinae, Odostomellinae and Tiberiinae.

In the taxonomy of Bouchet & Rocroi (2005), this subfamily Cingulininae has been downgraded to the rank of tribe Cingulinini and belonging to the subfamily Turbonillinae.

== Genera ==
Genera within the subfamily Cingulininae include:

- Cingulina A. Adams, 1860 - type genus
- Cinctiuga Laseron, 1951 : synonym of Odostomia (Cinctiuga) Laseron, C.F., 1951
- Coemansia Briart & Cornet, 1873
- Paracingulina Nomura, 1936
- Polyspirella Carpenter in Gould, 1861
- Pseudocingulina Nomura, 1936
- Puncticingulina Nomura, 1936

== Problematic genera ==
The following genera are difficult to place within the group Cingulininae + Eulimellinae + Turbonillinae:

- Atomiscala DeBoury, 1909
- Hamarilla Eames & Wilkins, 1957
- Kejdonia (Pseudographis) Mifsud, 1998
- Rissopsetia Dell, 1956
