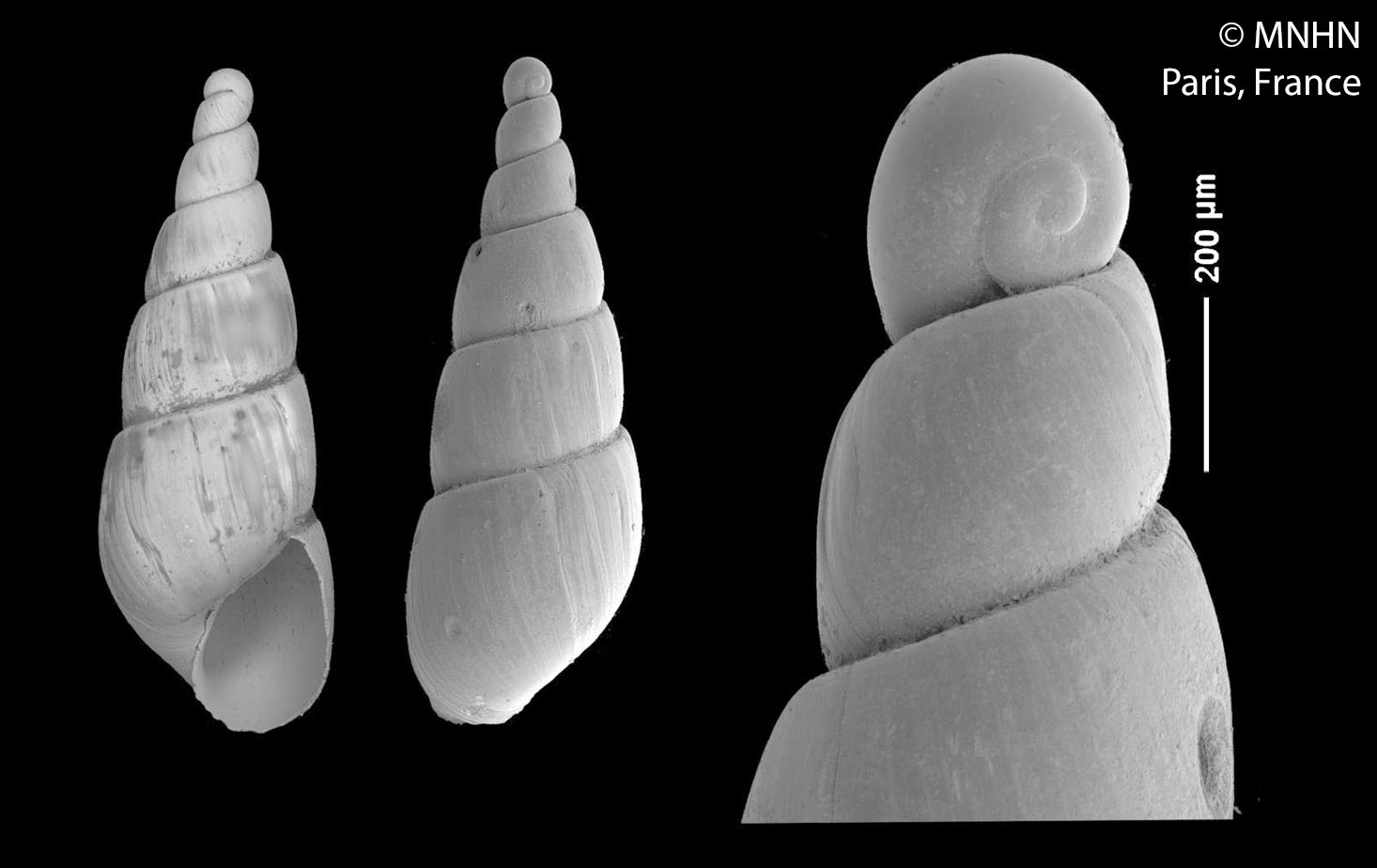
- Shell of Bouchetmella assimilis (holotype at MNHN, Paris)

Scientific classification
- Kingdom: Animalia
- Phylum: Mollusca
- Class: Gastropoda
- Subcohort: Panpulmonata
- Superfamily: Pyramidelloidea
- Family: Pyramidellidae
- Subfamily: Turbonillinae; H. G. Bronn, 1849

Genera
- See text

Synonyms
- Anisocyclidae Van Aartsen, 1995; Cingulinini Saurin, 1958· accepted, alternate representation; Eulimellini Saurin, 1958· accepted, alternate representation; Turbonillini Bronn, 1849· accepted, alternate representation

= Turbonillinae =

Subfamily of gastropods

Turbonillinae is a subfamily of mostly minute parasitic sea snails, marine gastropod molluscs in the family Pyramidellidae, the pyrams and their allies.

This subfamily has been shown to be monophyletic

== Taxonomy ==
In the taxonomy of Schander, Van Aartsen & Corgan (1999) Turbonillinae is a part of the family Turbonillidae.

- Family Turbonillidae Bronn, 1849
  - Subfamily Turbonillinae Bronn, 1849
  - Subfamily Cingulininae Saurin, 1958
  - Subfamily Eulimellinae Saurin, 1958

According to Schander, Van Aartsen & Corgan (1999) there are 27 genera within the Turbonillinae.

Turbonillinae has been one of eleven recognised subfamilies in the family Pyramidellidae (according to the taxonomy of Ponder & Lindberg, 1997).

In the taxonomy of Bouchet & Rocroi (2005), this subfamily comprises the subfamilies Cingulininae and Eulimellinae, that have been downgraded to the rank of tribe.

- Subfamily Turbonillinae Bronn, 1849
  - Tribe Turbonillini Bronn, 1849
  - Tribe Cingulinini Saurin, 1958
  - Tribe Eulimellini Saurin, 1958

In 2010 the subfamily Turbonillinae has been recognized as monophyletic

== Genera ==
Genera within the subfamily Turbonillinae include:

tribe Turbonillini

- Turbonilla Risso, 1826 - type genus of the subfamily Turbonillinae
- Asmunda Dall & Bartsch, 1904
- Bacteridiella Saurin, 1959
- Bartschella Iredale, 1916
- Bouchetmella Peñas & Rolán, 2016
- Careliopsis Mörch, 1875
- Cylindroturbonilla Nordsieck, 1972
- Ebalina Thiele, 1929
- Exesilla Laseron, 1959
- Gispyrella Laws, 1937
- Graciliturbonilla Nordsieck, 1972
- Houbrickia Wise, 1996
- Lancea Peace, 1868
- Magniturbonilla Nordsieck, 1972
- Mormula A. Adams, 1863
- Nisiturris Dall & Bartsch, 1906
- Paramormula Nomura, 1939
- Paraturbonilla Boettger, 1906
- Planpyrgiscus Laws, 1937
- Pselliogyra Dall & Bartsch, 1909 : synonym of Parthenina Bucquoy, Dautzenberg & Dollfus, 1883
- Puposyrnola Cossmann, 1921
- Pyrgiscilla Laws, 1937
- Pyrgiscus Philippi, 1841
- Pyrgolampros Sacco, 1892
- Pyrgolidium Monterosato, 1884
- Striarcana Laws, 1937
- Sulcoturbonilla Sacco, 1892
- Tereoturbonilla Eames, 1951
- Turbolidium Robba, 2013
- Zaphella Laseron, 1959: synonym of Asmunda Dall & Bartsch, 1904

tribe Cingulinini

tribe Eulimellini

tribe ?

- Kleinella A. Adams, 1860

Genera brought into synonymy:

- Amamimormula Kuroda, 1928: synonym of Turbonilla Risso, 1826
- Baldra Dall & Bartsch, 1904: synonym of Turbonilla Risso, 1826

== Problematic genera within the family Turbonillinae ==
The following genera were difficult to place within the subfamily Turbonillinae (= Turbonillini + Cingulinini + Eulimellini):

- Atomiscala DeBoury, 1909
  - Atomiscala islandica Warén, 1989
- Hamarilla Eames & Wilkins, 1957
- Pseudographis Mifsud, 1998: synonym of Kejdonia Mifsud, 1999
- Rissopsetia Dell, 1956
  - Rissopsetia hummelincki Faber, 1984
  - Rissopsetia islandica Warén, 1989

The genus Ebala was previously placed in the Eulimellinae, but was then placed in the family Ebalidae, that is a synonym of Murchisonellidae.

== Distribution ==
This family is found worldwide.

== Shell description ==
The shell of these snails has a blunt, heterostrophic protoconch, which is pointed sideways. The shell of most species are rather high and slender.

The texture of these shells is usually ribbed sculptured in various forms and often also have more or less prominent spirals. Their color is mostly white, cream or yellowish, sometimes with red or brown lines.

The adult shell, the teleoconch is dextrally coiled, but the larval shells are sinistral. This results in a sinistrally coiled protoconch. The opening of the shell, the aperture is closed by a lid, a so called operculum.

== Life habits ==
The Turbonillinae are ectoparasites, feeding mainly on other molluscs and on annelid worms.

They do not have a radula. Instead their long proboscis is used to pierce the skin of its prey and suck up its fluids and soft tissues. The eyes on the grooved tentacles are situated toward the base of the tentacles. Between the head and the foot, a lobed process called the mentum (= thin projection) is visible.

These molluscs are hermaphrodites.
