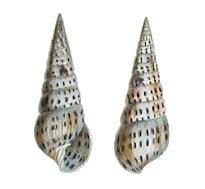
- Pyramidella acus

Scientific classification
- Kingdom: Animalia
- Phylum: Mollusca
- Class: Gastropoda
- Subcohort: Panpulmonata
- Superfamily: Pyramidelloidea
- Family: Pyramidellidae
- Subfamily: Pyramidellinae; J. E. Gray, 1840

Type genus
- Pyramidella Lamarck, 1799

= Pyramidellinae =

Subfamily of sea snails

Pyramidellinae is a taxonomic subfamily of minute sea snails, marine gastropod mollusks in the family Pyramidellidae, the pyrams and their allies.

== Taxonomy ==
It is one of eleven recognised subfamilies of the marine gastropod family Pyramidellidae (according to the taxonomy of Ponder & Lindberg, 1997), which are as follows: Odostomiinae, Turbonillinae, Chrysallidinae, Cingulininae, Cyclostremellinae, Sayellinae, Syrnolinae, Eulimellinae, Pyramidellinae, Odostomellinae and Tiberiinae.

=== 2005 taxonomy ===
In the taxonomy of Bouchet & Rocroi (2005), this subfamily consists of the following tribes, adding the tribe Sayellini containing only two genera Sayella and Petitella.

- Tribe Pyramidellini Gray, 1840
- Tribe Sayellini Wise, 1996 - former subfamily Sayellinae

== Genera ==
According to Schander, Van Aartsen & Corgen (1999) there are 12 genera within the Pyramidellinae:

tribe Pyramidellini

- Callolongchaeus Dall, 1903: synonym of Longchaeus Mörch, 1875
- Creonella Wade, 1917
- Lacrimiforma Sohl, 1963
- Locklinia Bartsch, 1955
- Longchaeus Mörch, 1875
- Milda Dall & Bartsch, 1904
- Otopleura Fischer, 1885
- Pharcidella Dall, 1889: synonym of Longchaeus Mörch, 1875
- Pyramidella Gray, 1840 - type genus of the tribe family Pyramidellidae
- Triptychus Mörch, 1875
- Urambella Laseron, 1959: synonym of Pyramidella Lamarck, 1799
- Voluspa (gastropod) Dall & Bartsch, 1904;: synonym of Longchaeus Mörch, 1875

tribe Sayellini
