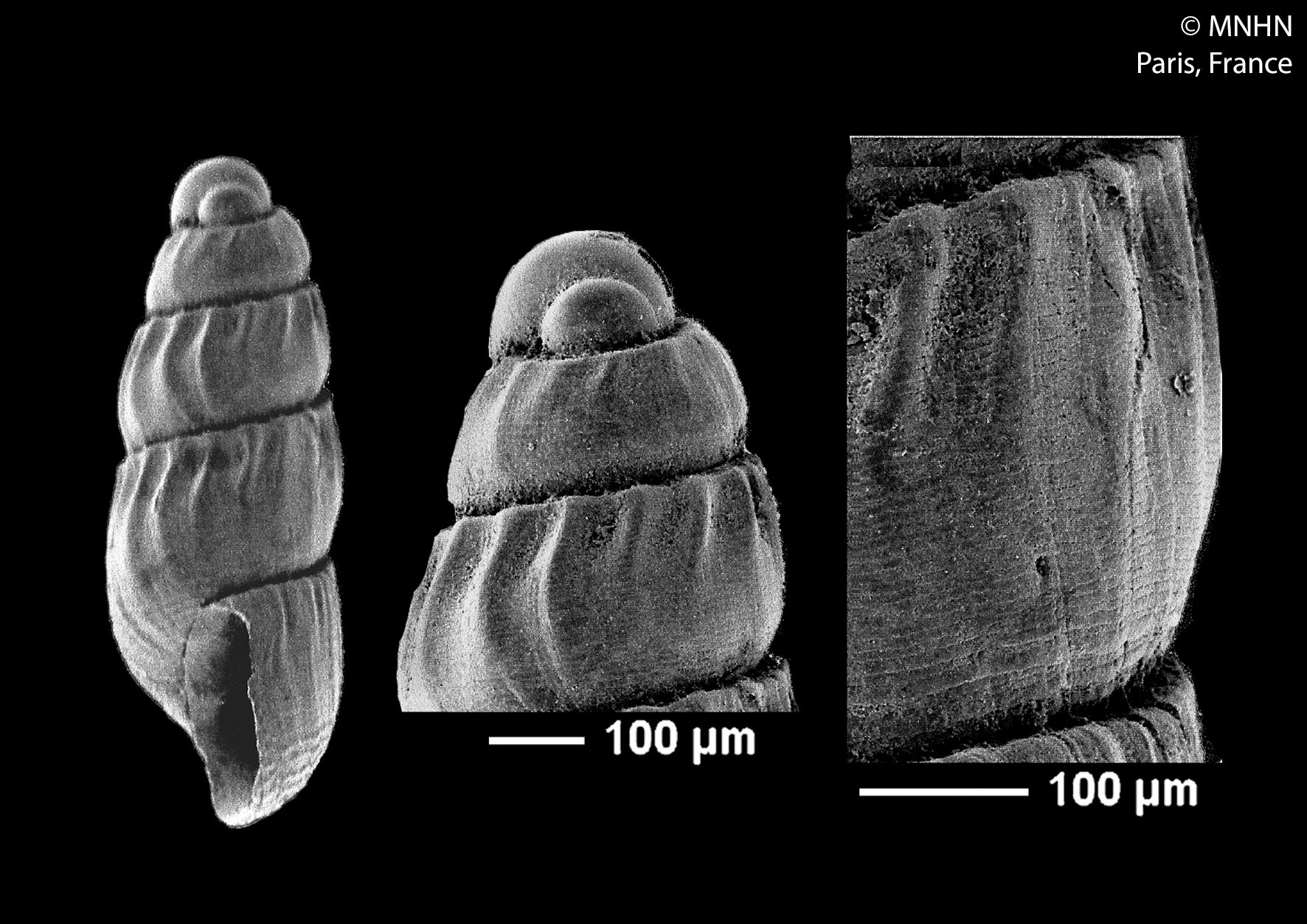
- Shell of Careliopsis utdigitulus (paratype at MNHN, Paris)

Scientific classification
- Kingdom: Animalia
- Phylum: Mollusca
- Class: Gastropoda
- Family: Pyramidellidae
- Subfamily: Turbonillinae
- Tribe: Eulimellini
- Genus: Careliopsis; Mörch, 1875

Type species
- Monoptygma styliformis Mörch, 1875

Synonyms
- Eulimella (Careliopsis) Mörch, 1875; Monoptygma (Careliopsis) Mörch, 1875 (original rank); Turbonilla (Careliopsis) Mörch, 1875 (superseded combination)

= Careliopsis =

Genus of gastropods

Careliopsis is a genus of sea snails, marine gastropod mollusks in the family Pyramidellidae, the pyrams and their allies.

== Distribution ==
- Marine

== Species ==
Species within the genus Careliopsis, include the following:

- Careliopsis bahiensis (Castellanos, 1982)
- Careliopsis carifa (Bartsch, 1915)
- Careliopsis clathratula (Mörch, 1875)
- Careliopsis delicatula Güller & Zelaya, 2019
- Careliopsis flexuosa Saurin, 1962
- Careliopsis modesta (de Folin, 1870)
- Careliopsis rionegrina Güller & Zelaya, 2019
- Careliopsis styliformis (Mörch, 1875)
- Careliopsis sublaevis Saurin, 1958
- Careliopsis tongaensis Peñas & Rolán, 2016
- Careliopsis turgida Güller & Zelaya, 2019
- Careliopsis utdigitulus Peñas & Rolán, 2017

Species brought into synonymy

- Careliopsis bermudensis (Dall & Bartsch, 1911): synonym of Bacteridium bermudense (Dall & Bartsch, 1911)
- Careliopsis densistriata (Nomura, 1936): synonym of Murchisonella densistriata (Nomura, 1936)
- Careliopsis flexuosus [sic]: synonym of Careliopsis flexuosa Saurin, 1962 (original misspelling: incorrect gender ending)
- Careliopsis octona (Guppy, 1896): synonym of Bacteridium resticulum (Dall, 1889)
