= Asmunda =

Scientific classification
- Kingdom: Animalia
- Phylum: Mollusca
- Class: Gastropoda
- Superfamily: Pyramidelloidea
- Family: Pyramidellidae
- Subfamily: Turbonillinae
- Genus: Asmunda; Dall & Bartsch, 1904

Type species
- Chemnitzia turrita C. B. Adams, 1852

Synonyms
- Turbonilla (Asmunda) Dall & Bartsch, 1904; Zaphella Laseron, 1959

Genus of gastropods

Asmunda is a genus of sea snails, marine gastropod mollusks in the family Pyramidellidae, the pyrams and their allies.

== Species ==
Species within the genus Asmunda include:

- Asmunda ambulatia (Laseron, 1951)
- Asmunda belsantii Saurin, 1959
- Asmunda chuttina Saurin, 1959
- Asmunda clara Saurin, 1959
- Asmunda elegantula (A. Adams, 1860)
- Asmunda exilissima (Nomura, 1938)
- Asmunda ludovica (Thiele, 1925)
- Asmunda metula (A. Adams, 1860)
- Asmunda secta (Saurin, 1958)
- Asmunda silvii Saurin, 1959
- Asmunda tenuicostata (Robba, Di Geronimo, Chaimanee, Negri & Sanfilippo, 2004)
- Asmunda tribulationis (Hedley, 1909)
- Asmunda turrita (C. B. Adams, 1852)
