= Bacteridiella =

Scientific classification
- Kingdom: Animalia
- Phylum: Mollusca
- Class: Gastropoda
- Superfamily: Pyramidelloidea
- Family: Pyramidellidae
- Subfamily: Turbonillinae
- Genus: Bacteridiella; Saurin, 1959

Type species
- Bacteridiella filiformis Saurin, 1959

Genus of gastropods

Bacteridiella is a genus of small sea snails, marine gastropod mollusks in the family Pyramidellidae, the pyrams and their allies.

== Species ==
- Bacteridiella filiformis Saurin, 1959

The following species were brought into synonymy:

- The unaccepted species Bacteridiella gofasi Schander, 1994: synonym of Eulimella gofasi (Schander, 1994)
