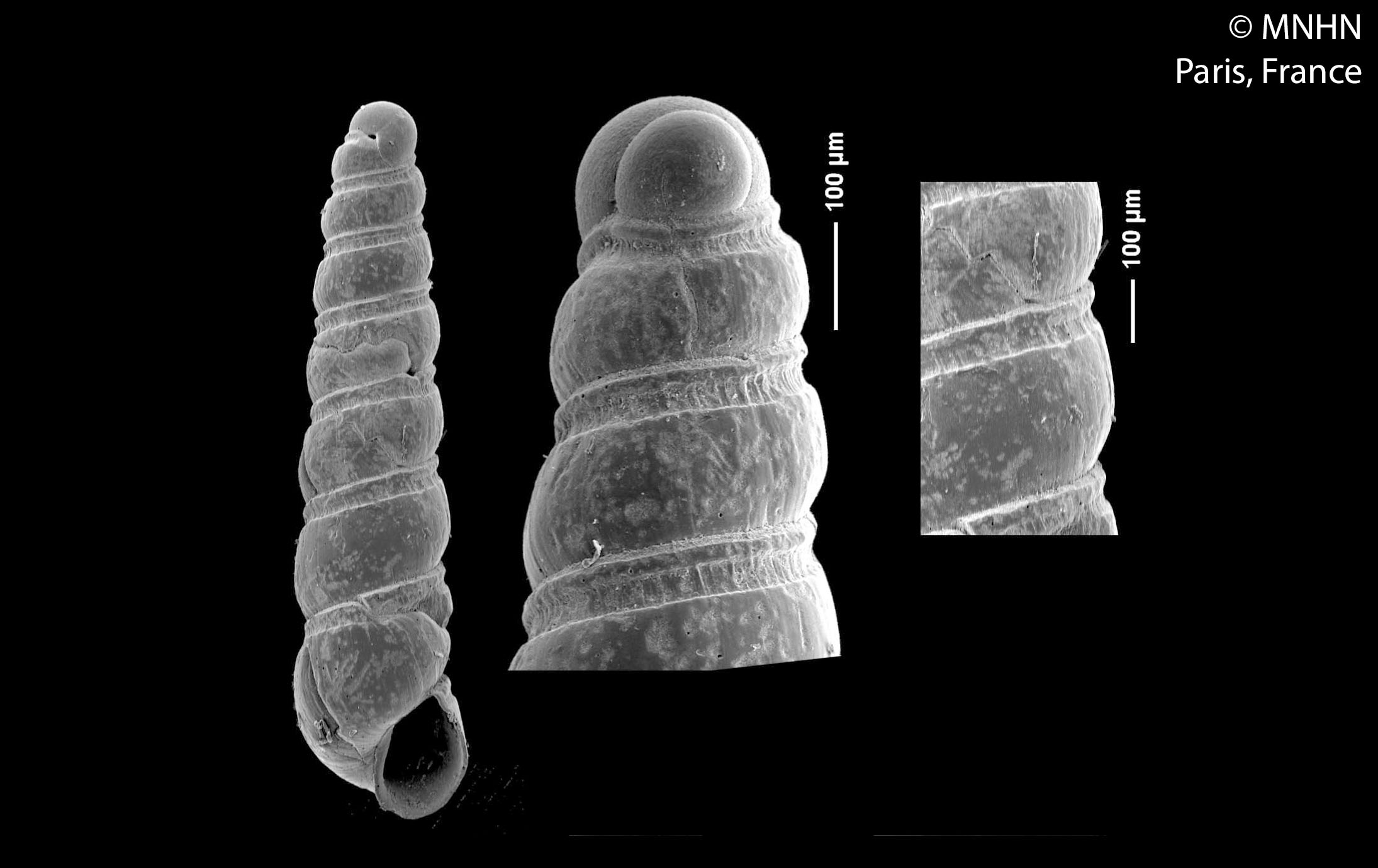
- Shell of Ebalina torniformae (holotype at MNHN, Paris)

Scientific classification
- Kingdom: Animalia
- Phylum: Mollusca
- Class: Gastropoda
- Superfamily: Pyramidelloidea
- Family: Pyramidellidae
- Subfamily: Turbonillinae
- Genus: Ebalina; Thiele, 1929

Type species
- Aclis monolirata de Folin, 1873

= Ebalina =

Genus of gastropods

Ebalina is a genus of small sea snails, marine gastropod mollusks in the family Pyramidellidae, the pyrams and their allies.

== Species ==
- Ebalina conjuncta Peñas & Rolán, 2016
- Ebalina diaphana (A. Adams, 1861)
- Ebalina monolirata (de Folin, 1873)
- Ebalina scripta Peñas & Rolán, 2016
- Ebalina similiter Peñas & Rolán, 2016
- Ebalina torniformae Peñas & Rolán, 2016
- Ebalina undata Peñas & Rolán, 2016
- Ebalina varellensis Saurin, 1959
- Ebalina vixornata (de Folin, 1878)
