= Pyrgolidium =

Scientific classification
- Kingdom: Animalia
- Phylum: Mollusca
- Class: Gastropoda
- Superfamily: Pyramidelloidea
- Family: Pyramidellidae
- Subfamily: Turbonillinae
- Genus: Pyrgolidium; Monterosato, 1884

Type species
- Chemnitzia internodula S. V. Wood, 1848

Genus of gastropods

Pyrgolidium is a genus of sea snails, marine gastropod mollusks in the family Pyramidellidae, the pyrams and their allies.

== Species ==
Species within the genus Pyrgolidium include:

- Pyrgolidium internodulum (S. V. Wood, 1848)
- Pyrgolidium josettae (Saurin, 1959)
