= Turbonilla kraussii =

Scientific classification
- Kingdom: Animalia
- Phylum: Mollusca
- Class: Gastropoda
- Family: Pyramidellidae
- Subfamily: Turbonillinae
- Genus: Turbonilla
- Species: T. kraussii

Binomial name
- Turbonilla kraussii H. Adams & A. Adams, 1853

Synonyms
- Chemnitzia lactea Krauss, 1848 (junior secondary homonym of Turbo...); Turbonilla kraussi Clessin, 1900 ·

Species of gastropod

Turbonilla kraussii is a species of sea snail, a marine gastropod mollusk in the family Pyramidellidae, the pyrams and their allies.
