= Bacteridium =

Scientific classification
- Kingdom: Animalia
- Phylum: Mollusca
- Class: Gastropoda
- Family: Pyramidellidae
- Subfamily: Turbonillinae
- Tribe: Eulimellini
- Genus: Bacteridium; Thiele, 1929

Synonyms
- Eulimella (Bacteridium) Thiele, 1929

Genus of gastropods

Bacteridium is a genus of sea snails, marine gastropod mollusks in the family Pyramidellidae, the pyrams and their allies.

== Distribution ==
Most of the marine species within this genus occur in the Caribbean Sea and the Gulf of Mexico, with the exception of Bacteridium resticulum being situated off the west coast of Africa and its countries, Angola, Namibia and Gabon.

== Species ==
There are four known species within the genus Bacteridium, these include:

- Bacteridium bermudense (Dall & Bartsch, 1911)
- Bacteridium carinatum (de Folin, 1870)
- Bacteridium resticulum (Dall, 1889)
- Bacteridium vittatum (A. Adams, 1861)
