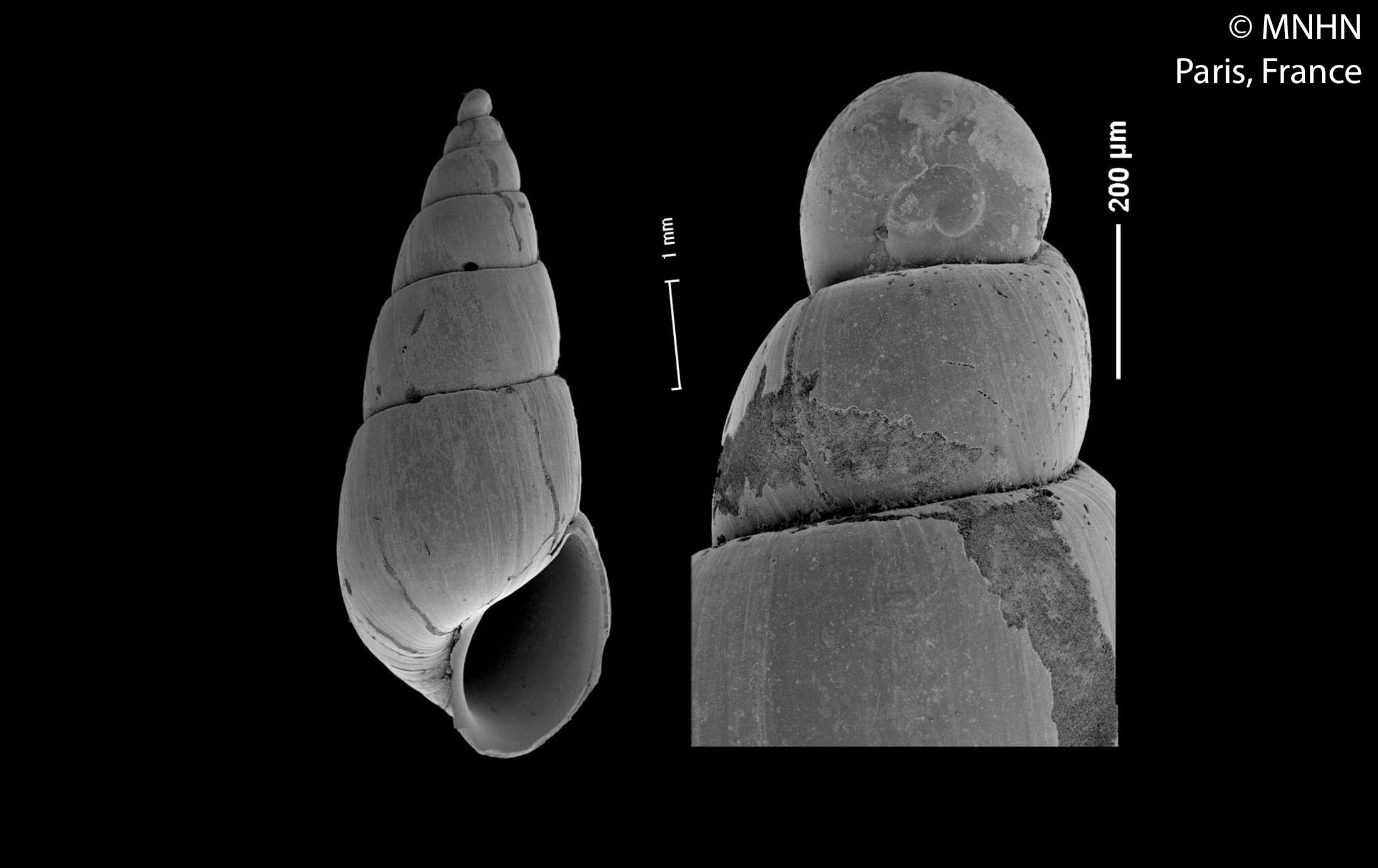
- Shell of Bouchetmella representata (holotype at MNHN, Paris)

Scientific classification
- Kingdom: Animalia
- Phylum: Mollusca
- Class: Gastropoda
- Superfamily: Pyramidelloidea
- Family: Pyramidellidae
- Subfamily: Turbonillinae
- Genus: Bouchetmella; Peñas & Rolán, 2016

= Bouchetmella =

Genus of gastropods

Bouchetmella is a genus of small sea snails, marine gastropod mollusks in the family Pyramidellidae, the pyrams and their allies.

== Species ==
- Bouchetmella assimilis Peñas & Rolán, 2016
- Bouchetmella boucheti Peñas & Rolán, 2016
- Bouchetmella distorta Peñas & Rolán, 2016
- Bouchetmella microstriata Peñas & Rolán, 2016
- Bouchetmella minor Peñas & Rolán, 2016
- Bouchetmella representata Peñas & Rolán, 2016
