= Bacteridium vittatum =

Scientific classification
- Kingdom: Animalia
- Phylum: Mollusca
- Class: Gastropoda
- Family: Pyramidellidae
- Genus: Bacteridium
- Species: B. vittatum

Binomial name
- Bacteridium vittatum (A. Adams, 1861)

Species of gastropod

Bacteridium vittatum is a species of sea snail, a marine gastropod mollusk in the family Pyramidellidae, the pyrams and their allies. The species belongs to the gastropod genus Bacteridium, along with Bacteridium bermudense, Bacteridium carinatum and Bacteridium resticulum.
