= Longchaeus folinii =

Scientific classification
- Kingdom: Animalia
- Phylum: Mollusca
- Class: Gastropoda
- Family: Pyramidellidae
- Genus: Longchaeus
- Species: L. folinii

Binomial name
- Longchaeus folinii (Dall, 1889)

Synonyms
- Pyramidella folinii Dall, 1889 (original combination)

Species of gastropod

Longchaeus folinii is a species of sea snail, a marine gastropod mollusc in the family Pyramidellidae, the pyrams and their allies.

== Description ==
=== Exterior Shell and Structure ===
The shell grows to a length of 5 mm. The original description of L. folinii describes the shell as a pinkish white color with a shape similar to L. candidus. It is noted that the shell differs from L. candidus in that it has a more pronounced sulcus. The shell's overall shape, if similar to L. candidus as stated, can be inferred to be elongate conical with straight sides. L. folinii is described further to have eight total whorls, a rounded base, and a quadrate aperture. Details of the shell include fine spiral striae on the body whorl with incremental rugosities. The shell's sutures are deep and have strong transverse ribs and semi-flat spaces between the sutures. The pillar, or columella, of the shell has three folds. The outer lip has three internal lirae.

== Distribution and Habitat ==
This marine species occurs in the Lesser Antilles off Barbados.
