= Odostomia chordata =

Scientific classification
- Kingdom: Animalia
- Phylum: Mollusca
- Class: Gastropoda
- Superfamily: Pyramidelloidea
- Family: Pyramidellidae
- Genus: Odostomia
- Species: O. chordata

Binomial name
- Odostomia chordata Suter, 1908

Synonyms
- Odostomia (Evalea) chordata Suter, 1908

Species of gastropod

Odostomia chordata is a species of sea snail, a marine gastropod mollusk in the family Pyramidellidae, the pyrams and their allies.
