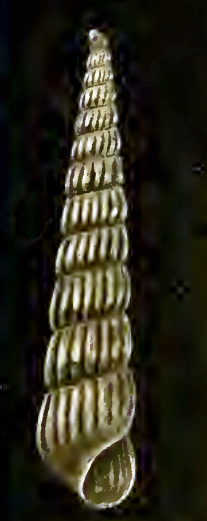
- Drawing of a shell of Nisiturris crystallina

Scientific classification
- Kingdom: Animalia
- Phylum: Mollusca
- Class: Gastropoda
- Superfamily: Pyramidelloidea
- Family: Pyramidellidae
- Subfamily: Turbonillinae
- Genus: Nisiturris; Dall & Bartsch, 1906

Type species
- Turbonilla crystallina Dall & Bartsch, 1906

Synonyms
- Chemnitzia (Nisiturris) Dall & Bartsch, 1906; Turbonilla (Nisiturris) Dall & Bartsch, 1906

= Nisiturris =

Genus of gastropods

Nisiturris is a genus of sea snails, marine gastropod mollusks in the family Pyramidellidae, the pyrams and their allies.

== Species ==
Species within the genus Nisiturris include:

- Nisiturris alma (Thiele, 1925)
- Nisiturris anfraconvex (Peñas & Rolán, 2010)
- Nisiturris angustissima (Melvill, 1904)
- Nisiturris crystallina (Dall & Bartsch, 1906)
- Nisiturris darnleyensis (Brazier, 1877)
- Nisiturris diezi (Peñas & Rolán, 1997)
- Nisiturris fernandezantoni (Peñas & Rolán, 2010)
- Nisiturris fluminensis (Pimenta & Absalão, 2004)
- Nisiturris gabrieli (Hedley, 1910)
- Nisiturris obliqua (Saurin, 1959)
- Nisiturris obliquastructionis (Peñas & Rolán, 2010)
- Nisiturris phuae (Saurin, 1959)
- Nisiturris ryalli (Peñas & Rolán, 1997)
- Nisiturris trinquieri (Saurin, 1959)
- Nisiturris tumidula (Corgan & Van Aartsen, 1998)

Species brought into synonymy

- Nisiturris melvilli (Dautzenberg, 1912): synonym of Turbonilla melvilli Dautzenberg, 1912 (alternate representation)
- Nisiturris tumida (Saurin, 1959): synonym of Nisiturris tumidula (Corgan & Van Aartsen, 1998)
