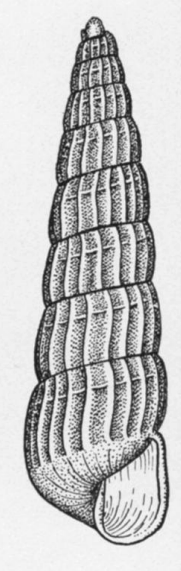
- Drawing of a shell of Turbolidium uniliratum

Scientific classification
- Kingdom: Animalia
- Phylum: Mollusca
- Class: Gastropoda
- Superfamily: Pyramidelloidea
- Family: Pyramidellidae
- Subfamily: Turbonillinae
- Genus: Turbolidium; Robba, 2013

= Turbolidium =

Genus of gastropods

Turbolidium is a genus of sea snails, marine gastropod mollusks in the family Pyramidellidae, the pyrams and their allies.

== Species ==
Species within the genus Turbolidium include:

- Turbolidium franciscoi (Peñas & Rolán, 1997)
- Turbolidium qenenoji (Peñas & Rolán, 2010)
- †Turbolidium schroederi (Wissema, 1947): the type species, known from the Pleistocene of Sumatra
- Turbolidium uniliratum (Bush, 1899)
- Turbolidium uniliratum (Saurin, 1959): the names Turbolidium uniliratum (Bush, 1899) and Turbolidium uniliratum (Saurin, 1959) are secondary homonyms.
