= Asmunda tenuicostata =

Scientific classification
- Kingdom: Animalia
- Phylum: Mollusca
- Class: Gastropoda
- Family: Pyramidellidae
- Genus: Asmunda
- Species: A. tenuicostata

Binomial name
- Asmunda tenuicostata (Robba, Di Geronimo, Chaimanee, Negri & Sanfilippo, 2004)

Synonyms
- Zaphella tenuicostata Robba, Di Geronimo, Chaimanee, Negri & Sanfilippo, 2004 (original combination)

Species of gastropod

Asmunda tenuicostata is a species of sea snail, a marine gastropod mollusk in the family Pyramidellidae, the pyrams and their allies.
