= Turbolidium qenenoji =

Scientific classification
- Kingdom: Animalia
- Phylum: Mollusca
- Class: Gastropoda
- Family: Pyramidellidae
- Genus: Turbolidium
- Species: T. qenenoji

Binomial name
- Turbolidium qenenoji (Peñas & Rolán, 2010)

Synonyms
- Turbonilla qenenoji Peñas & Rolán, 2010 (original combination)

Species of gastropod

Turbolidium qenenoji is a species of sea snail, a marine gastropod mollusk in the family Pyramidellidae, the pyrams and their allies.
