= Longchaeus insularum =

- Drawing of a shell of Longchaeus insularum

Scientific classification
- Kingdom: Animalia
- Phylum: Mollusca
- Class: Gastropoda
- Family: Pyramidellidae
- Genus: Longchaeus
- Species: L. insularum

Binomial name
- Longchaeus insularum (Pilsbry, 1922)

Synonyms
- Longchaeus canaliculatus (Sowerby II, 1874); Pyramidella canaliculata Sowerby II, 1874 (non Gabb, 1873); Pyramidella insularum Pilsbry, 1922 (original combination)

Species of sea snail

Longchaeus insularum is a species of sea snail, a marine gastropod mollusk in the family Pyramidellidae, the pyrams and their allies.

== Description ==
The shell has a yellowish color, banded and spotted with chestnut, with fine longitudinal white raised striations, appearing like low rounded riblets, with occasional darker macillations, especially on the base. The whorls of the teleoconch are flattened. The suture and periphery are channeled. The aperture is channeled at the base. The columella is straight, three plaited. The length of the shell is 15 mm.

== Distribution ==
This species occurs in the Pacific Ocean off Hawaii.
