= Bacteridium resticulum =

Scientific classification
- Kingdom: Animalia
- Phylum: Mollusca
- Class: Gastropoda
- Family: Pyramidellidae
- Genus: Bacteridium
- Species: B. resticulum

Binomial name
- Bacteridium resticulum (Dall, 1889)

Synonyms
- Ebala resticula (Dall, 1889); Pyramidella resticula (Dall, 1889); Stylopsis resticula (Dall, 1889); Turbonilla bermudensis auct. non Dall & Bartsch, 1911; Turbonilla octona Guppy, 1896; Turbonilla resticula Dall, 1889

Species of gastropod

Bacteridium resticulum is a species of sea snail, a marine gastropod mollusc in the family Pyramidellidae, the pyrams and their allies. The species remains within the Bacteridium genus of gastropods, with the exception of the other three related species being Bacteridium bermudense, Bacteridium carinatum and Bacteridium vittatum.

== Description ==
The length of the shell measures approximately 3.5 mm, other species within this genus all measure roughly the same measurements.

== Distribution ==
This species occurs in many geographical locations around vast marine terrains throughout the Caribbean Sea and the Gulf of Mexico, these include the following locations:

- Caribbean Sea, a large sea covering approximately 2,754,000 km^{2} (1,063,000 sq. mi.) Coordinates: (15°N 75°W)
- Cayman Islands, a small group of islands lying within the Caribbean Sea, southwest of Cuba. Coordinates: (19°20′N 81°24′W)
- Colombia, a country in northwest, South America. Coordinates: (4°35′N 74°4′W)
- Gulf of Mexico, a country in northwest, South America. Coordinates: (4°35′N 74°4′W)
- Mexico, a large country, exceeding the geographical limits of the Gulf of Mexico. Coordinates: (19°03′N 99°22′W)
