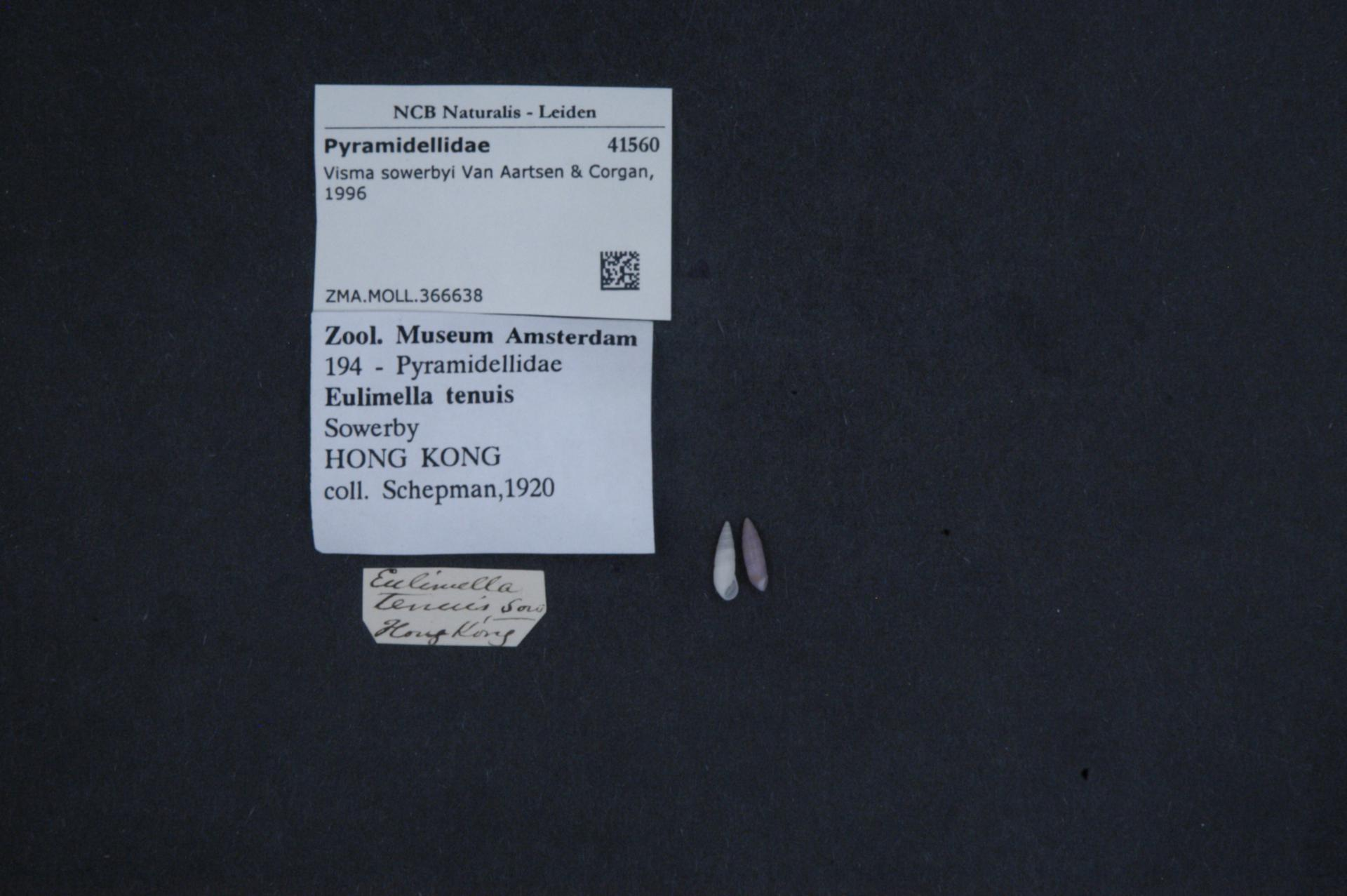
- Visma sowerbyi

Scientific classification
- Kingdom: Animalia
- Phylum: Mollusca
- Class: Gastropoda
- Family: Pyramidellidae
- Tribe: Eulimellini
- Genus: Visma; Dall & Bartsch, 1904

= Visma (gastropod) =

Genus of gastropods

Visma is a genus of sea snails, marine gastropod mollusks in the family Pyramidellidae, the pyrams and their allies.

== Species ==
Species within the genus Visma include:

- Visma sowerbyi van Aartsen & Corgan, 1996
