= Sayella watlingsi =

Scientific classification
- Kingdom: Animalia
- Phylum: Mollusca
- Class: Gastropoda
- Family: Pyramidellidae
- Genus: Sayella
- Species: S. watlingsi

Binomial name
- Sayella watlingsi Morrison, 1939

Species of gastropod

Sayella watlingsi is a species of small sea snail, a marine gastropod mollusk in the family Pyramidellidae, the pyrams and their allies.

== Description ==
The shell grows to a length of 3.4 mm.

== Distribution ==
The type species was found off the Bahamas.
