= Striarcana =

Scientific classification
- Kingdom: Animalia
- Phylum: Mollusca
- Class: Gastropoda
- Subcohort: Panpulmonata
- Superfamily: Pyramidelloidea
- Family: Pyramidellidae
- Genus: Striarcana; Laws, 1937

Type species
- Striarcana cryptolira Laws, 1937

Synonyms
- Turbonilla (Striarcana) Laws, 1937

Genus of gastropods

Striarcana is a genus of sea snails, marine gastropod mollusks in the family Pyramidellidae, the pyrams and their allies.

== Species ==
Species within the genus Striarcana include:

- Striarcana cryptolira Laws, 1937
- Striarcana tauranga Laws, 1937
