= Rissopsetia maoria =

Scientific classification
- Kingdom: Animalia
- Phylum: Mollusca
- Class: Gastropoda
- Family: Pyramidellidae
- Genus: Rissopsetia
- Species: R. maoria

Binomial name
- Rissopsetia maoria Dell, 1956

Species of gastropod

Rissopsetia maoria is a species of sea snail, a marine gastropod mollusk in the family Pyramidellidae, the pyrams and their allies.
