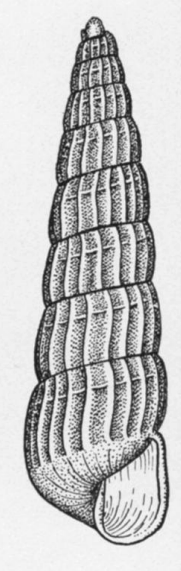
- Drawing of an apertural view of Turbolidium uniliratum

Scientific classification
- Kingdom: Animalia
- Phylum: Mollusca
- Class: Gastropoda
- Family: Pyramidellidae
- Genus: Turbolidium
- Species: T. uniliratum

Binomial name
- Turbolidium uniliratum (Bush, 1899)

Synonyms
- Turbonilla unilirata Bush, 1899 (original combination)

= Turbolidium uniliratum =

Species of gastropod

Turbolidium uniliratum is a species of sea snail, a marine gastropod mollusk in the family Pyramidellidae, the pyrams and their allies.

== Distribution ==
This marine species occurs in the following locations:

- Caribbean Sea
- Cayman Islands
- Gulf of Mexico
- Lesser Antilles
- Mexico
- Puerto Rico
