= Kejdonia cachiai =

Scientific classification
- Kingdom: Animalia
- Phylum: Mollusca
- Class: Gastropoda
- Family: Pyramidellidae
- Genus: Kejdonia
- Species: K. cachiai

Binomial name
- Kejdonia cachiai (Mifsud, 1998)

Synonyms
- Pseudographis cachiai (Mifsud, 1998)

Species of gastropod

Kejdonia cachiai is a species of sea snail, a marine gastropod mollusk in the family Pyramidellidae, the pyrams and their allies.

== Description ==
The length of the shell varies between 0.75 mm and 1.2 mm.

== Distribution ==
This species occurs in the following locations:

- In the Mediterranean Sea off Malta.
