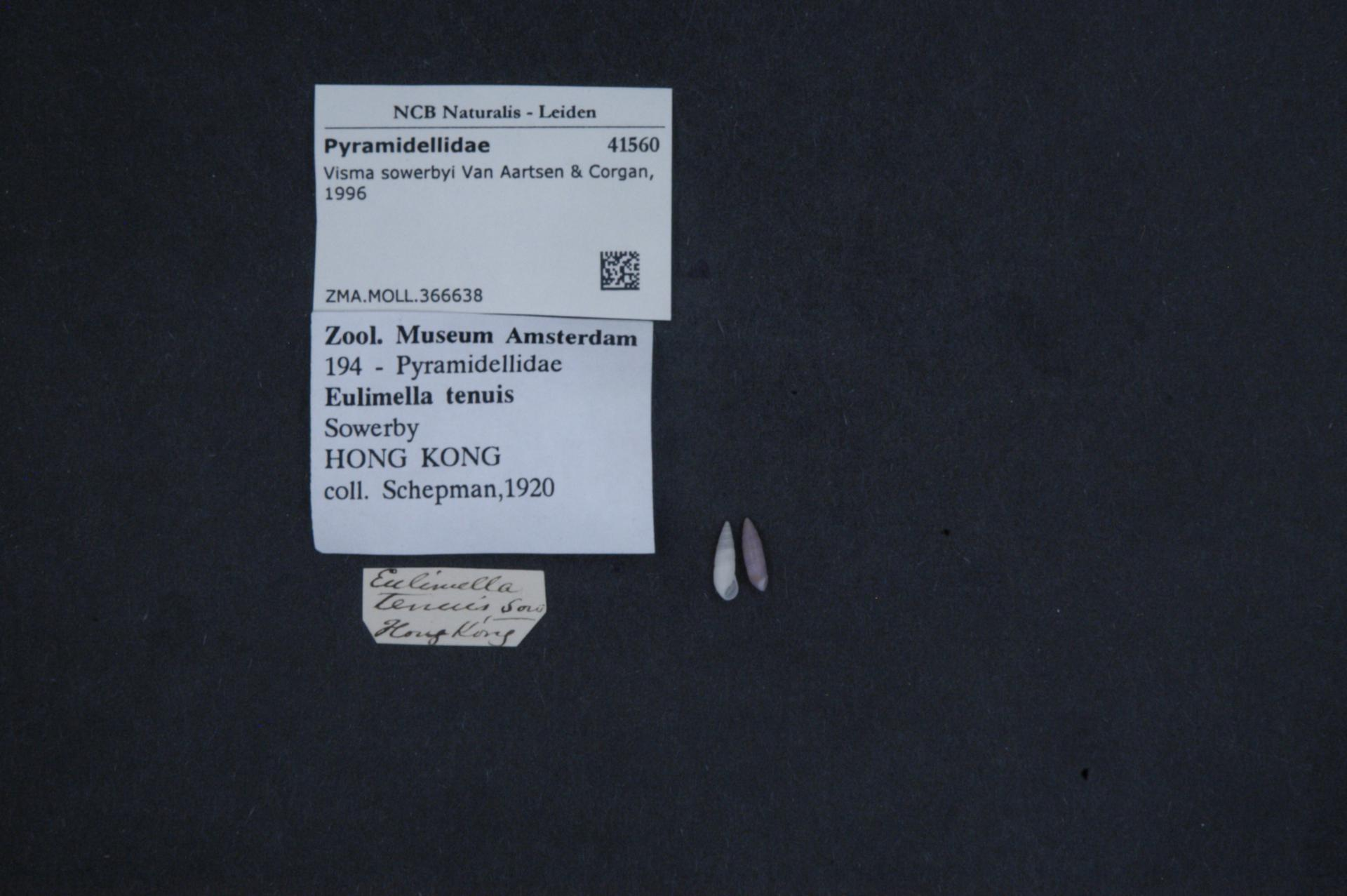

Scientific classification
- Kingdom: Animalia
- Phylum: Mollusca
- Class: Gastropoda
- Family: Pyramidellidae
- Genus: Visma
- Species: V. sowerbyi

Binomial name
- Visma sowerbyi van Aartsen & Corgan, 1996

Synonyms
- Eulimella tenuis G.B. Sowerby III, 1894

= Visma sowerbyi =

Species of gastropod

Visma sowerbyi is a rare species of sea snail, a marine gastropod mollusk in the family Pyramidellidae, the pyrams and their allies.
