= Nisiturris obliquastructionis =

Scientific classification
- Kingdom: Animalia
- Phylum: Mollusca
- Class: Gastropoda
- Family: Pyramidellidae
- Genus: Nisiturris
- Species: N. obliquastructionis

Binomial name
- Nisiturris obliquastructionis (Peñas & Rolán, 2010)

Synonyms
- Turbonilla obliquastructionis Peñas & Rolán, 2010 (original combination)

Species of gastropod

Nisiturris obliquastructionis is a species of sea snail, a marine gastropod mollusc in the family Pyramidellidae, the pyrams and their allies.

== Description ==
The length of the shell varies between 1.3 mm and 3.1 mm.

== Distribution ==
This species occurs in the Pacific Ocean off the Solomons, Vanuatu, and Fiji.
