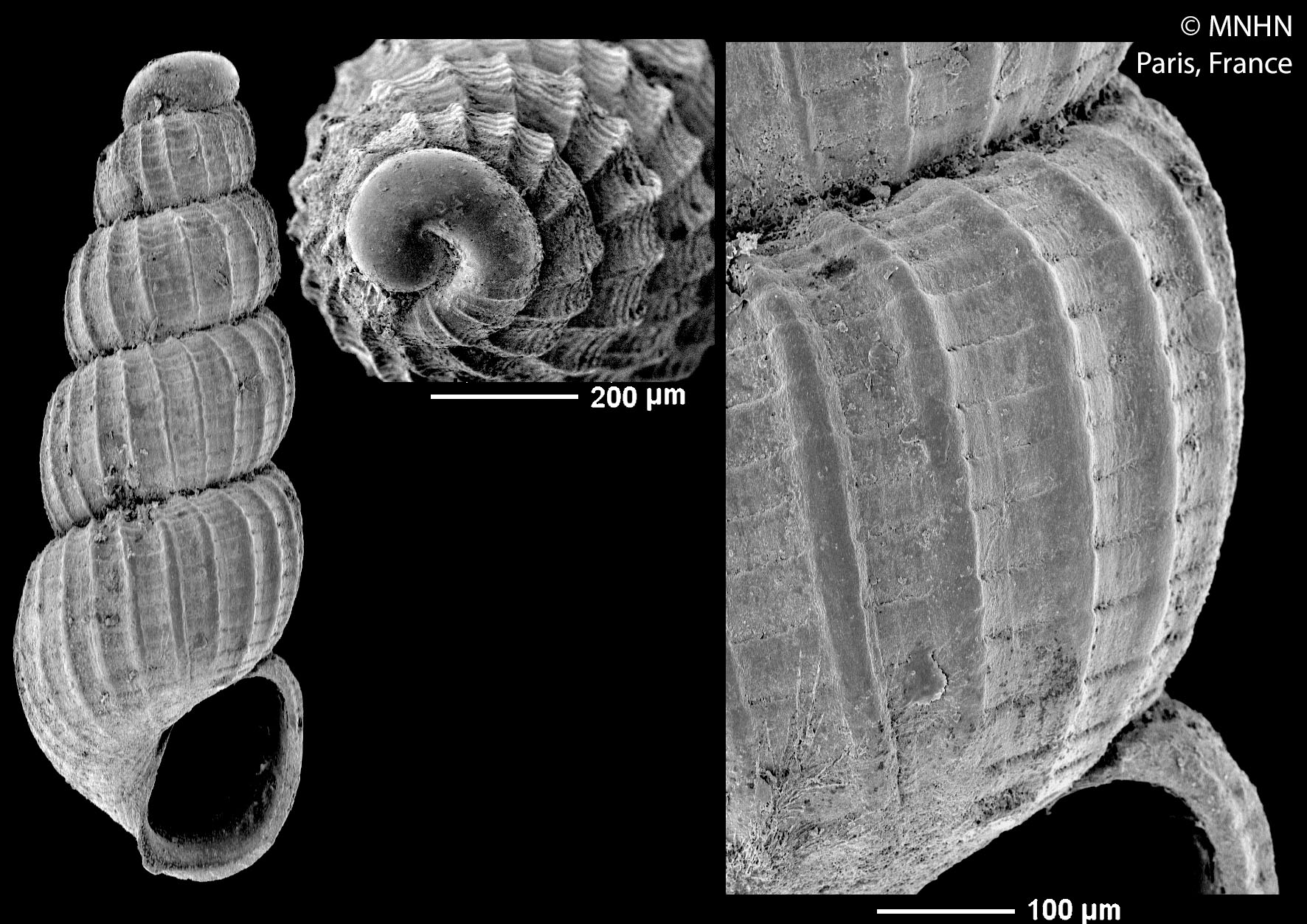
- Shell of Rissopsetia altispira (specimen at MNHN, Paris)

Scientific classification
- Kingdom: Animalia
- Phylum: Mollusca
- Class: Gastropoda
- Family: Pyramidellidae
- Genus: Rissopsetia
- Species: R. altispira

Binomial name
- Rissopsetia altispira Ponder, 1974

= Rissopsetia altispira =

Species of gastropod

Rissopsetia altispira is a species of sea snail, a marine gastropod mollusk in the family Pyramidellidae, the pyrams and their allies.

== Distribution ==
This marine species occurs off New Caledonia and Western Australia
