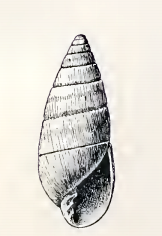
- Drawing of a shell of Longchaeus achates

Scientific classification
- Kingdom: Animalia
- Phylum: Mollusca
- Class: Gastropoda
- Family: Pyramidellidae
- Genus: Longchaeus
- Species: L. achates

Binomial name
- Longchaeus achates (Gould, 1853)

Synonyms
- Odostomia achates Gould, 1853 (basionym); Pyramidella (Pharcidella) achates Gould, 1853; Pyramidella achates (A. Gould, 1853)

= Longchaeus achates =

Species of gastropod

Longchaeus achates is a species of sea snail, a marine gastropod mollusk in the family Pyramidellidae, the pyrams and their allies.

== Description ==
=== External Shell and Structure ===
The shell is stout, shining, milk-white, with irregular, flammulated spots of rust color, which are densest about one-third of the distance between the sutures anterior to the summits, where they form an almost continuous band. The length of the shell varies between 9.8 and 11.6 mm (0.39 and 0.46 in). (The whorls of the protoconch are decollated.) The ten whorls of the teleoconch are weakly rounded, slightly shouldered and faintly crenulated at the summit. They are marked by lines of growth, which are somewhat variable in strength, the strongest being on the side of the crenulations. The sutures are well impressed. The periphery is marked by a moderately strong, spiral sulcus. The base of the shell is rather long, and is crossed by many lines of growth. The aperture is elongate-pyriform, and rather compressed laterally. The posterior angle is acute. The outer lip is thin. The columella is short, and heavy. It is bounded by a low, strong basal fasciole, bearing three oblique folds, the posterior one of which is lamellar and situated a little anterior to the insertion of the columella; the other two folds are much less strongly developed and more oblique. The parietal wall is covered with a thin callus.

=== Live Snail ===
Species in the family Pyramidellidae possess an extensible proboscis, but no functional radula. The proboscis ends in a stylus that is used to pierce the skin of their prey.

== Distribution and Habitat ==
The type species was found in the Pacific Ocean off the Gulf of California. L. achates is a marine benthic species. Most species in genus Longchaeus are found in waters less than 40 meters below the surface.

== Life Habits ==
=== Diet ===
Species in the family Pyramidellidae are carnivorous ectoparasites, feeding primarily on clams, oysters, polychaetes, and occasionally other gastropods.

=== Reproduction ===
Pyramidellidae species are simultaneous hermaphrodites and reproduce sexually.

=== Locomotion ===
L. achates is a primarily sedentary species, attaching itself to a host for significant periods of time.
