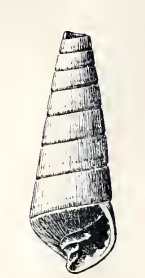
- Drawing of a shell of Longchaeus mazatlanicus

Scientific classification
- Kingdom: Animalia
- Phylum: Mollusca
- Class: Gastropoda
- Family: Pyramidellidae
- Genus: Longchaeus
- Species: L. mazatlanicus

Binomial name
- Longchaeus mazatlanicus Dall & Bartsch, 1909

Synonyms
- Pyramidella (Longchaeus) mazatlanica Dall & Bartsch, 1909; Pyramidella mazatlantica Dall & Bartsch, 1909 (misspelling); Pyramidella mazatlantica [sic] (misspelling)

= Longchaeus mazatlanicus =

Species of gastropod

Longchaeus mazatlanicus is a species of sea snail, a marine gastropod mollusk in the family Pyramidellidae, the pyrams and their allies.

== Description ==
The shell has a very regularly conic shape. It has a horn color, with a little darker band on the middle between the sutures, which is bordered at its anterior margin by a faint light line. Its length measures 11 mm. The two whorls of the protoconch form a depressed helicoid spire. Its axis is at right angles to that of the succeeding turns, in the first of which it is about two-thirds immersed. The thirteen whorls of the teleoconch are flattened. They are scarcely at all contracted at the suture, with a narrow, very finely crenulated shoulder at the summit. The suturesare well impressed. The periphery of the body whorl is strongly, sharply, and deeply sulcate. The base of the shell is short, well rounded, and with a strong fasciole at the insertion of the columella. The entire surface of the spire and the base is marked only by lines of growth. The aperture is irregularly oval. The posterior angle is acute, with a moderate channel anteriorly. The outer lip is thin. It is reinforced by four strong internal lirations, two of which are above and two below the periphery. The columella is slender, twisted and revolute. The posterior fold is lamellar, the anterior two slender and very oblique.

== Distribution ==
This marine species occurs in the Pacific Ocean from Southern California to southern Mexico.
