= Heteroneritidae =

Scientific classification
- Kingdom: Animalia
- Phylum: Mollusca
- Class: Gastropoda
- Superfamily: Pyramidelloidea
- Family: †Heteroneritidae; Gründel, 1998

Extinct family of gastropods

†Heteroneritidae is an extinct taxonomic family of sea snails, marine gastropod mollusks in the superfamilia Pyramidelloidea.

== Taxonomy ==
=== 2005 taxonomy ===
Heteroneritidae has been classified in the Pyramidelloidea within the informal group Lower Heterobranchia in the taxonomy of Bouchet & Rocroi (2005). This family has no subfamilies.

=== 2010 taxonomy ===
Jörger et al. (2010) have redefined major groups within the Heterobranchia and they moved Pyramidelloidea to Panpulmonata.

== Genera ==
Genera within the family Heteroneritidae include:

- Heteronerita Gründel, 1998 - type genus of the family Heteroneritidae
  - Heteronerita rotundata
