= Careliopsis styliformis =

Scientific classification
- Kingdom: Animalia
- Phylum: Mollusca
- Class: Gastropoda
- Family: Pyramidellidae
- Genus: Careliopsis
- Species: C. styliformis

Binomial name
- Careliopsis styliformis (Mörch, 1875)

Species of gastropod

Careliopsis styliformis is a species of sea snail, a marine gastropod mollusk in the family Pyramidellidae, the pyrams and their allies. The species is one of three species within the Careliopsis genus of gastropods, with the exception of the others being Careliopsis clathratula and Careliopsis modesta. The species is one of two species to maintain a binomial authority proposed by Mörch in 1875, the other proposal by Mörch is Careliopsis clathratula.

== Distribution ==
This species occurs in the following locations:

- Caribbean Sea
- Gulf of Mexico
- Lesser Antilles
- Mexico
