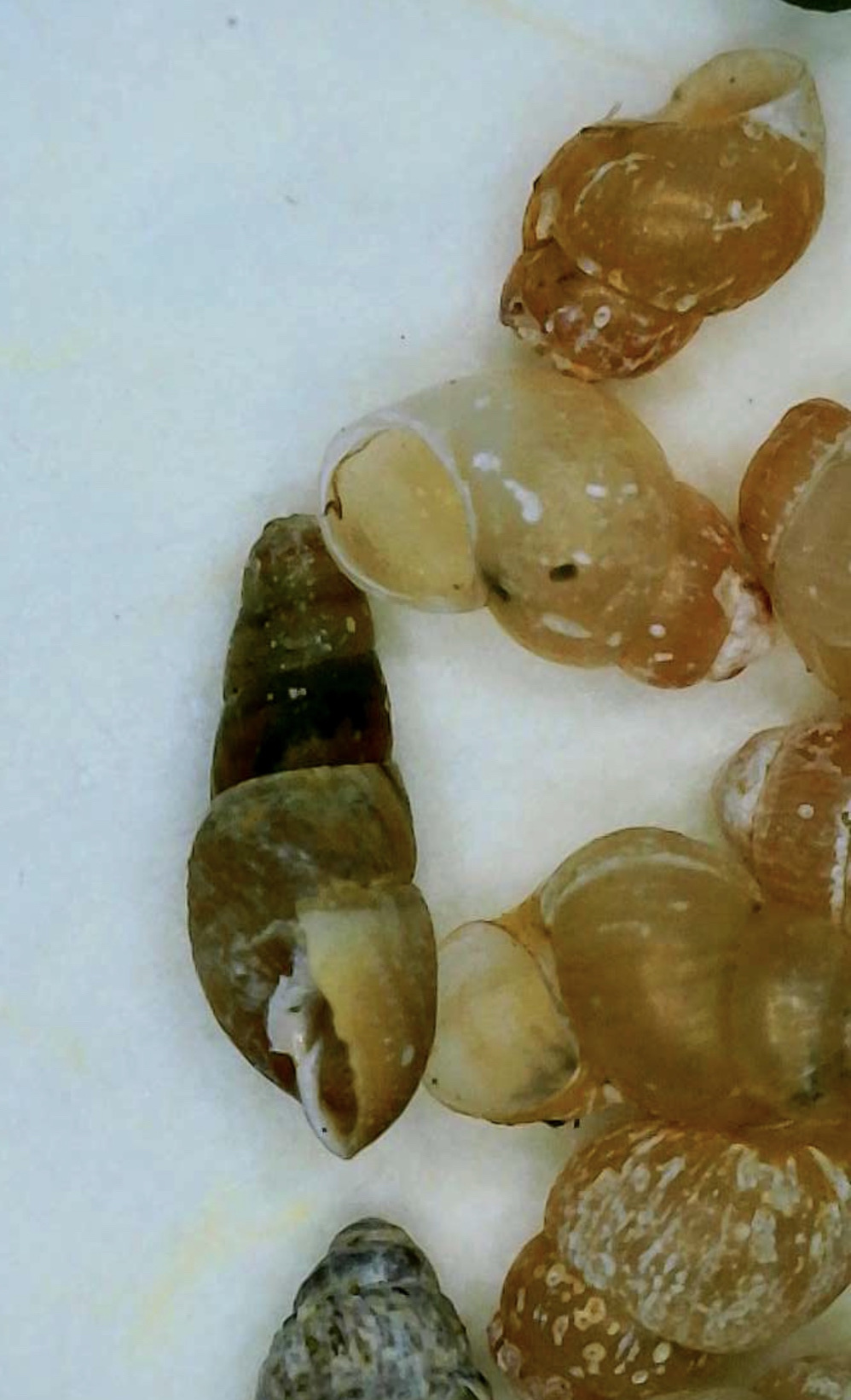
- Sayella fusca found in Wellfleet, MA, with multiple minute hydrobia shells surrounding it

Scientific classification
- Kingdom: Animalia
- Phylum: Mollusca
- Class: Gastropoda
- Family: Pyramidellidae
- Genus: Sayella
- Species: S. fusca

Binomial name
- Sayella fusca (C. B. Adams, 1839)

Synonyms
- Chemnitzia fusca (C. B. Adams, 1839); Jaminia fusca (C. B. Adams, 1839); Odostomia fusca (C. B. Adams, 1839); Odostomia winkleyi Bartsch, P., 1909; Pyramidella fusca (C. B. Adams, 1839); Pyramidella winkleyi Bartsch, 1909; Pyramis fusca C.B. Adams, 1839 (basionym)

= Sayella fusca =

Species of gastropod

Sayella fusca, common name the brown sayella, is a species of minute sea snail, a marine gastropod mollusk or micromollusk in the family Pyramidellidae, the pyrams and their allies.

== Description ==
The length of the shell varies between 3 mm and 6 mm. Except for microscopic spiraling lines, its surface is smooth, and they are a translucent amber brown color.

== Distribution ==
This species occurs in the following locations:

- Caribbean Sea : Cuba, Puerto Rico
- Gulf of Mexico : Mexico
- Northwest Atlantic Ocean : Prince Edward Island, Canada; Gulf of Maine

== Notes ==
Additional information regarding this species:

- Distribution: Range: 47°N to 18°N; 93.13°W to 64°W. Distribution: Canada; Canada: Prince Edward Island, New Brunswick; USA: Massachusetts, Rhode Island, Connecticut, New York, New Jersey, North Carolina, Florida; Florida: West Florida; Mexico; Mexico: Tabasco, Yucatán State, Quintana Roo
- Habitat: intertidal and infralittoral of the Gulf and estuary

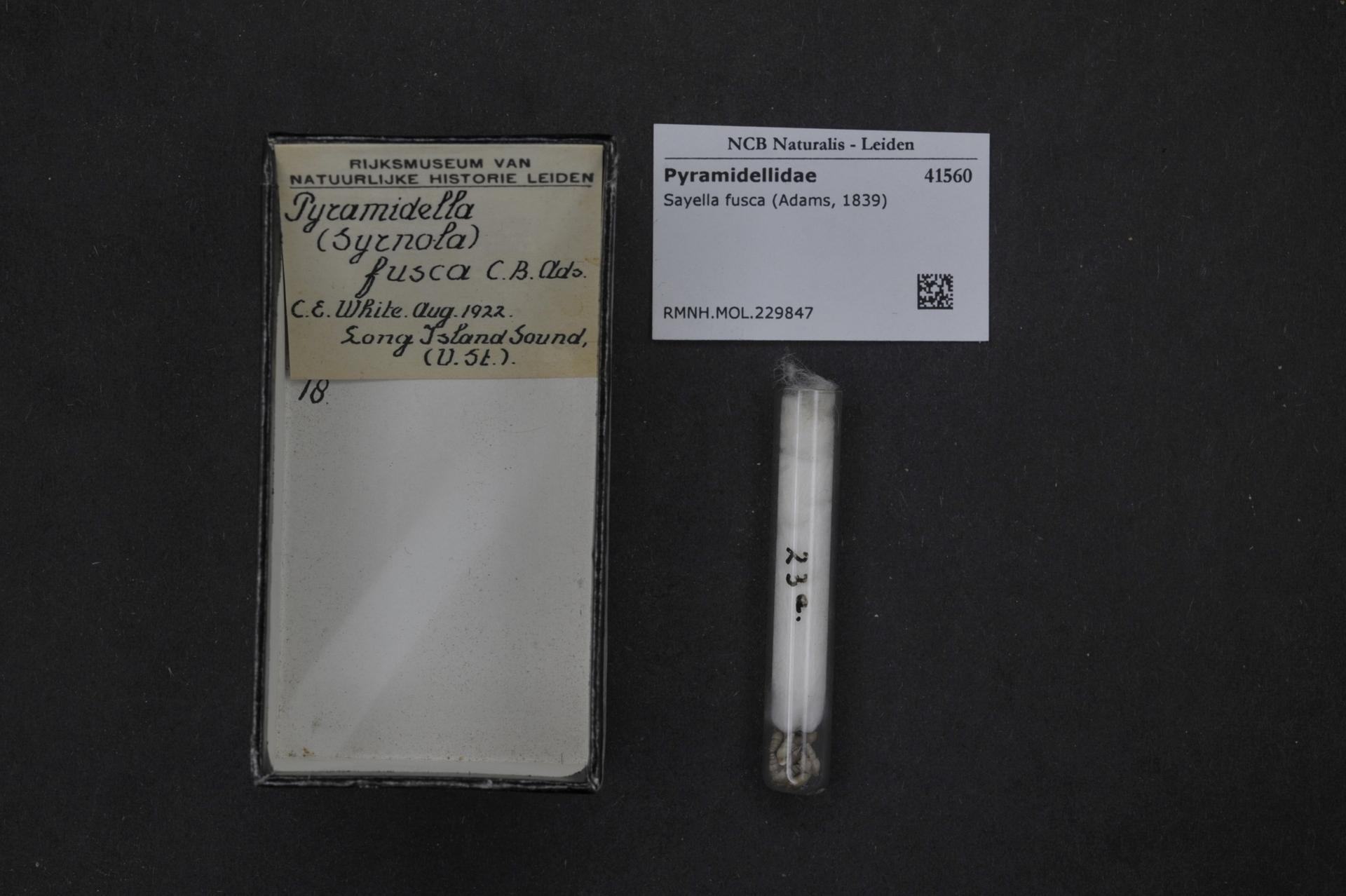
