= Sayella hemphillii =

Scientific classification
- Kingdom: Animalia
- Phylum: Mollusca
- Class: Gastropoda
- Family: Pyramidellidae
- Genus: Sayella
- Species: S. hemphillii

Binomial name
- Sayella hemphillii (Dall, 1884)

Synonyms
- Leuconia hemphillii Dall, 1884 (basionym); Melampus hemphillii (Dall, 1884); Sayella livida Rehder, 1935

Species of gastropod

Sayella hemphillii is a species of small sea snail, a marine gastropod mollusk in the family Pyramidellidae, the pyrams and their allies.

The earliest known description is by W. H. Dall.

== Description ==
The shell grows to a length of 4 mm.

== Distribution ==
This species occurs in the following locations:

- Gulf of Mexico (Florida, Texas)
