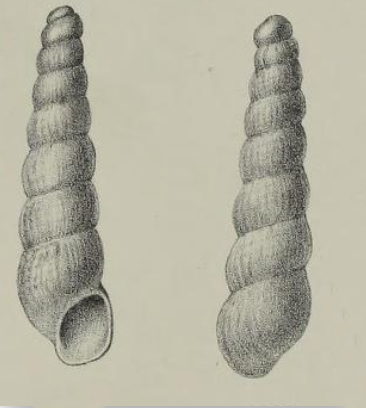
- Shell of Atomiscala xenophyes (holotype)

Scientific classification
- Kingdom: Animalia
- Phylum: Mollusca
- Class: Gastropoda
- Family: Cimidae
- Genus: Atomiscala
- Species: A. xenophyes

Binomial name
- Atomiscala xenophyes (Melvill & Standen, 1912)

Synonyms
- Eulimella xenophyes (Melvill & Standen, 1912); Turbonilla xenophyes Melvill & Standen, 1912 (original combination)

= Atomiscala xenophyes =

Species of gastropod

Atomiscala xenophyes is a species of sea snail, a marine gastropod mollusc in the family Cimidae.

According to a study published in November 2011 in Zootaxa, this species does not belong in Eulimella.

== Description ==
The shell grows to a length of 2. 75 mm.

(Original description in Latin) The shell is aciculate-fusiform (needle- to spindle-shaped), delicate and slightly translucent. It is milky white to pale straw-colored, with a subtle sheen. It is composed of nine whorls: the apical whorls are bulbous and swollen, gently heterostrophic; the subsequent whorls slightly ventricose, with distinctly impressed sutures. When viewed under magnification, the surface shows extremely fine longitudinal lirae, though in some specimens these are nearly or completely obsolete. The aperture is oval. The peristome is thin. The columella is simple.

== Distribution ==
This marine species occurs off Argentina and Tierra del Fuego.
