= Longchaeus inopinatus =

Scientific classification
- Kingdom: Animalia
- Phylum: Mollusca
- Class: Gastropoda
- Family: Pyramidellidae
- Genus: Longchaeus
- Species: L. inopinatus

Binomial name
- Longchaeus inopinatus (Schander, 1994)

Synonyms
- Longchaeus schanderi (van Aartsen, Gittenberger & Goud, 1998); Obeliscus suturalis Maltzan, 1885; Pharcidella inopinata Schander, 1994 (original combination); Pyramidella inopinata (Schander, 1994); Pyramidella schanderi van Aartsen, Gittenberger & Goud, 1998

Species of gastropod

Longchaeus inopinatus is a species of sea snail, a marine gastropod mollusk in the family Pyramidellidae, the pyrams and their allies.

== Description ==
The shell grows to a length of between 6 mm and 12 mm.

== Distribution ==
This marine species occurs in the following locations:

- Cape Verde
- Atlantic Ocean off Guinea, Senegal and Angola.
