= Turbolidium franciscoi =

Scientific classification
- Kingdom: Animalia
- Phylum: Mollusca
- Class: Gastropoda
- Family: Pyramidellidae
- Genus: Turbolidium
- Species: T. franciscoi

Binomial name
- Turbolidium franciscoi (Peñas & Rolán, 1997)

Synonyms
- Turbonilla franciscoi Peñas & Rolán, 1997 (original combination)

Species of gastropod

Turbolidium franciscoi is a species of sea snail, a marine gastropod mollusk in the family Pyramidellidae, the pyrams and their allies.
