= Careliopsis clathratula =

Scientific classification
- Kingdom: Animalia
- Phylum: Mollusca
- Class: Gastropoda
- Family: Pyramidellidae
- Genus: Careliopsis
- Species: C. clathratula

Binomial name
- Careliopsis clathratula (Mörch, 1875)

Synonyms
- Monoptygma clathratula Mörch, 1875

Species of gastropod

Careliopsis clathratula is a species of sea snail, a marine gastropod mollusk in the family Pyramidellidae, the pyrams and their allies. The species is one of three known species within the Careliopsis genus of gastropods, with the exception of the others being Careliopsis modesta and Careliopsis styliformis. The species is one of two species to maintain a binomial authority proposed by Mörch in 1875, the other by Mörch is Careliopsis styliformis.

== Distribution ==
- Marine
