= Sayella mercedordae =

Scientific classification
- Kingdom: Animalia
- Phylum: Mollusca
- Class: Gastropoda
- Family: Pyramidellidae
- Genus: Sayella
- Species: S. mercedordae

Binomial name
- Sayella mercedordae Penãs & Rolán, 1997

Species of gastropod

Sayella mercedordae is a species of small sea snail, a marine gastropod mollusk in the family Pyramidellidae, the pyrams and their allies.

== Description ==
The shell grows to a length of 2.1 mm.

== Distribution ==
This species occurs in the following locations:

- Cape Verde
