= Planpyrgiscus =

Scientific classification
- Kingdom: Animalia
- Phylum: Mollusca
- Class: Gastropoda
- Subcohort: Panpulmonata
- Superfamily: Pyramidelloidea
- Family: Pyramidellidae
- Genus: Planpyrgiscus; Laws, 1937

Type species
- † Turbonilla extenuata Marwick, 1931

Synonyms
- Planipyrgiscus sic; Turbonilla (Planpyrgiscus) Laws, 1937

Genus of gastropods

Planpyrgiscus is a genus of sea snails, marine gastropod mollusks in the family Pyramidellidae, the pyrams and their allies.

== Species ==
Species within the genus Planpyrgiscus include:

- † Planpyrgiscus disparilis Laws, 1940
- † Planpyrgiscus extenuatus (Marwick, 1931)
- Planpyrgiscus lawsi Dell, 1956
