= Sayella =

Scientific classification
- Kingdom: Animalia
- Phylum: Mollusca
- Class: Gastropoda
- Family: Pyramidellidae
- Subfamily: Pyramidellinae
- Tribe: Sayellini
- Genus: Sayella; Dall, 1885

Genus of sea snails

Sayella is a genus of minute sea snails, marine gastropod mollusks or micromollusks in the family Pyramidellidae, the pyrams and their allies.

== Shell description ==
Typical for this genus is the presence of only one prominent fold on the columella.

== Distribution ==
This genus occurs in the Atlantic Ocean off Eastern North America and also in the tropical West Atlantic.

== Species ==
Species within the genus Sayella include:

- Sayella abjecta (Hedley, 1909)
- Sayella chesapeakea Morrison, 1939
- Sayella fusca (C. B. Adams, 1839)
- Sayella hemphillii (Dall, 1884)
- Sayella mercedordae Penãs & Rolán, 1997
- Sayella watlingsi Morrison, 1939

Species brought into synonymy

- Sayella livida Rehder, 1935: synonym of Sayella hemphillii (Dall, 1884)
- Sayella micalii Peñas & Rolán, 1997: synonym of Tiberia micalii (Peñas & Rolán, 1997)
- Sayella producta (C. B. Adams, 1840): synonym of Syrnola producta (C. B. Adams, 1840)
