= Planpyrgiscus lawsi =

Scientific classification
- Kingdom: Animalia
- Phylum: Mollusca
- Class: Gastropoda
- Family: Pyramidellidae
- Genus: Planpyrgiscus
- Species: P. lawsi

Binomial name
- Planpyrgiscus lawsi Dell, 1956

Synonyms
- Turbonilla delli Powell, 1976

Species of gastropod

Planpyrgiscus lawsi is a species of sea snail, a marine gastropod mollusk in the family Pyramidellidae, the pyrams and their allies.

== Notes ==
Additional information regarding this species:

- Nomenclature: Turbonilla delli is the correct name for this species when Planpyrgiscus is treated as a synonym or subgenus of Turbonilla in which case Turbonilla lawsi (Dell, 1956) is preoccupied by T. lawsi Powell, 1937.
