= Nisiturris anfraconvex =

Scientific classification
- Kingdom: Animalia
- Phylum: Mollusca
- Class: Gastropoda
- Family: Pyramidellidae
- Genus: Nisiturris
- Species: N. anfraconvex

Binomial name
- Nisiturris anfraconvex Peñas & Rolán, 2010

Synonyms
- Turbonilla anfraconvex Peñas & Rolán, 2010 (original combination)

Species of gastropod

Nisiturris anfraconvex is a species of sea snail, a marine gastropod mollusc in the family Pyramidellidae, the pyrams and their allies.
