= Nisiturris fluminensis =

Scientific classification
- Kingdom: Animalia
- Phylum: Mollusca
- Class: Gastropoda
- Family: Pyramidellidae
- Genus: Nisiturris
- Species: N. fluminensis

Binomial name
- Nisiturris fluminensis (Pimenta & Absalao, 2004)

Synonyms
- Turbonilla fluminensis Pimenta & Absalão, 2004 (original combination)

Species of gastropod

Nisiturris fluminensis is a species of sea snail, a marine gastropod mollusk in the family Pyramidellidae, the pyrams and their allies.

== Description ==
The shell grows to a length of 4.7 mm.

== Distribution ==
This species occurs in the Atlantic Ocean off Brazil at depths between 50 m and 100 m.
