= Rissopsetia maccoyi =

Scientific classification
- Kingdom: Animalia
- Phylum: Mollusca
- Class: Gastropoda
- Family: Pyramidellidae
- Genus: Rissopsetia
- Species: R. maccoyi

Binomial name
- Rissopsetia maccoyi (Tenison-Woods, 1876)

Synonyms
- Rissoa maccoyi Tenison-Woods, 1876

Species of gastropod

Rissopsetia maccoyi is a species of sea snail, a marine gastropod mollusk in the family Pyramidellidae, the pyrams and their allies.
