= Sayella chesapeakea =

Scientific classification
- Kingdom: Animalia
- Phylum: Mollusca
- Class: Gastropoda
- Family: Pyramidellidae
- Genus: Sayella
- Species: S. chesapeakea

Binomial name
- Sayella chesapeakea Morrison, 1939

Species of gastropod

Sayella chesapeakea is a species of small sea snail, a marine gastropod mollusk in the family Pyramidellidae, the pyrams and their allies.

== Description ==
The length of the shell measures 3.9 mm.

== Distribution ==
This marine species occurs in the following locations:

- Northwest Atlantic Ocean (Maryland to North Carolina)

== Notes ==
Additional information regarding this species:

- Distribution: Range: 38.5°N to 35°N; 77°W to 76°W. Distribution: USA: Maryland, Virginia, North Carolina
