= Rissopsetia gracilis =

Scientific classification
- Kingdom: Animalia
- Phylum: Mollusca
- Class: Gastropoda
- Family: Pyramidellidae
- Genus: Rissopsetia
- Species: R. gracilis

Binomial name
- Rissopsetia gracilis (W. R. B. Oliver, 1915)

Synonyms
- Epigrus gracilis Oliver, 1915

Species of gastropod

Rissopsetia gracilis is a species of sea snail, a marine gastropod mollusk in the family Pyramidellidae, the pyrams and their allies.

== Taxonomy ==
Tentatively assigned to Rissopsetia by Ponder (1974); does not belong to Epigrus (Rissooidea).

== Distribution ==
This marine species is endemic to New Zealand.
