= Pyrgolidium internodulum =

Scientific classification
- Kingdom: Animalia
- Phylum: Mollusca
- Class: Gastropoda
- Family: Pyramidellidae
- Genus: Pyrgolidium
- Species: P. internodulum

Binomial name
- Pyrgolidium internodulum (S.V. Wood, 1848)

Synonyms
- Chemnitzia corbis Conti, 1864 (dubious synonym); Chemnitzia internodula S.V. Wood, 1848 (original name); Odostomia rosea Monterosato, 1877; Turbonilla (Pyrgolidium) internodula (S.V. Wood, 1848); Turbonilla rosea von Maltzan, 1885; Turbonilla (Pyrgolidium) rosea Monterosato, T.A. de M. di, 1877

Species of gastropod

Pyrgolidium internodula is a species of sea snail, a marine gastropod mollusk in the family Pyramidellidae, the pyrams and their allies.

== Description ==
The shell has a rosy color. The length of the shell varies between 3 mm and 7 mm. The whorls of the teleoconch are flattened with straight narrow ribs, becoming evanescent at the periphery of the body whorl. The interspaces are much wider, with two spiral series of nodules.

== Distribution ==
This species occurs in the following locations:

- Angola
- Cape Verde
- European waters (ERMS scope)
- Mediterranean Sea
- Morocco
- Portuguese Exclusive Economic Zone
- Senegal
- Spanish Exclusive Economic Zone
