= Nisiturris fernandezantoni =

Scientific classification
- Kingdom: Animalia
- Phylum: Mollusca
- Class: Gastropoda
- Family: Pyramidellidae
- Genus: Nisiturris
- Species: N. fernandezantoni

Binomial name
- Nisiturris fernandezantoni Peñas & Rolán, 2010

Species of gastropod

Nisiturris fernandezantoni is a species of sea snail, a marine gastropod mollusk in the family Pyramidellidae, the pyrams and their allies.
