= Careliopsis modesta =

Scientific classification
- Kingdom: Animalia
- Phylum: Mollusca
- Class: Gastropoda
- Family: Pyramidellidae
- Genus: Careliopsis
- Species: C. modesta

Binomial name
- Careliopsis modesta (de Folin, 1870)

Synonyms
- Monotygma modesta

Species of gastropod

Careliopsis modesta is a species of sea snail, a marine gastropod mollusk in the family Pyramidellidae, the pyrams and their allies. The species is one of three species within the Careliopsis genus of gastropods, with the exception of the others being Careliopsis clathratula and Careliopsis styliformis.

== Distribution ==
This marine species is distributed in European waters, populous areas for this species include the Bay of Biscay, Mediterranean Sea and the Irish Sea.
