= Asmunda turrita =

Scientific classification
- Kingdom: Animalia
- Phylum: Mollusca
- Class: Gastropoda
- Family: Pyramidellidae
- Genus: Asmunda
- Species: A. turrita

Binomial name
- Asmunda turrita (C.B. Adams, 1852)

Synonyms
- Chemnitzia turrita C. B. Adams, 1852 (original combination); Turbonilla turrita (C. B. Adams, 1852)

Species of gastropod

Asmunda turrita is a species of sea snail, a marine gastropod mollusk in the family Pyramidellidae, the pyrams and their allies.
