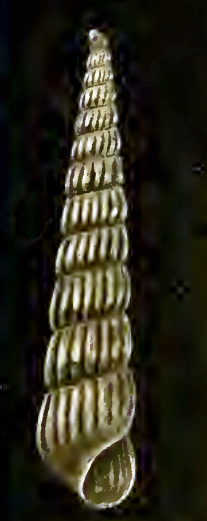
- Drawing of a shell of Nisiturris crystallina

Scientific classification
- Kingdom: Animalia
- Phylum: Mollusca
- Class: Gastropoda
- Family: Pyramidellidae
- Genus: Nisiturris
- Species: N. crystallina

Binomial name
- Nisiturris crystallina (Dall & Bartsch, 1906)

Synonyms
- Chemnitzia crystallina Dunker, 1869; Turbonilla lydia Thiele, 1925; Turbonilla (Nisiturris) crystallina Dall & Bartsch, 1906 (basionym)

= Nisiturris crystallina =

Species of gastropod

Nisiturris crystallina is a species of sea snail, a marine gastropod mollusk in the family Pyramidellidae, the pyrams and their allies.

== Description ==
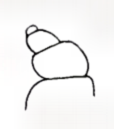
Pupoid protoconch (enlarged) of Nisiturris crystallina

The very slender and thin, almost transparent shell has an elongate-conic shape. Its length varies between 2.9 mm and 4.5 mm. It is slightly umbilicated. The smooth whorls of the protoconch are large, and very much elevated. They are coiled to resemble a small sinistral pupa. This pupoid shape makes this species peculiar, as most species in Turbonilla have a helicoid or planorboid protoconch. It is situated obliquely upon the spire of the whorls of the teleoconch and extending considerably beyond the lateral outline of this. The 12 whorls of the teleoconch are situated rather high between the sutures, somewhat overhanging (this is particularly true of the earlier volutions), and slightly shouldered at the summit. They are ornamented by strong, oblique, rounded axial ribs, which are slightly cusped at their posterior extremity, where they show a tendency toward becoming fused at the periphery. Twenty-two of these ribs occur upon the first (this whorl is more rounded than the rest and closer ribbed), fourteen upon the second, twelve upon the fifth, sixteen upon the tenth, and twenty upon the penultimate whorl. The intercostal spaces are twice as wide as the ribs, decidedly depressed, smooth, and terminating at the fusing point of the ribs on the periphery. The summits of succeeding whorls fall somewhat anterior to the periphery of the preceding whorl and give the whorls an overhanging effect as well as a narrow smooth band between the anterior termination of the intercostal spaces and the subchanneled sutures. The periphery and the base of the body whorl are well rounded, the latter very short, marked only by faint lines of growth. The aperture is very large, almost circular in outline. The outer lip is thin, transparent, and showing the external sculpture within. The columella is thin, curved and revolute, with a slight oblique fold near its insertion. The parietal wall is covered by a mere film of callus.

== Distribution ==
This species occurs in the Pacific Ocean off Indonesia, Samoa, Vanuatu; Fiji and the Solomons
