= Nisiturris diezi =

Scientific classification
- Kingdom: Animalia
- Phylum: Mollusca
- Class: Gastropoda
- Family: Pyramidellidae
- Genus: Nisiturris
- Species: N. diezi

Binomial name
- Nisiturris diezi (Peñas & Rolán, 1997)

Synonyms
- Turbonilla diezi Peñas & Rolán, 1997 (original combination)

Species of gastropod

Nisiturris diezi is a species of sea snail, a marine gastropod mollusk in the family Pyramidellidae, the pyrams and their allies.
