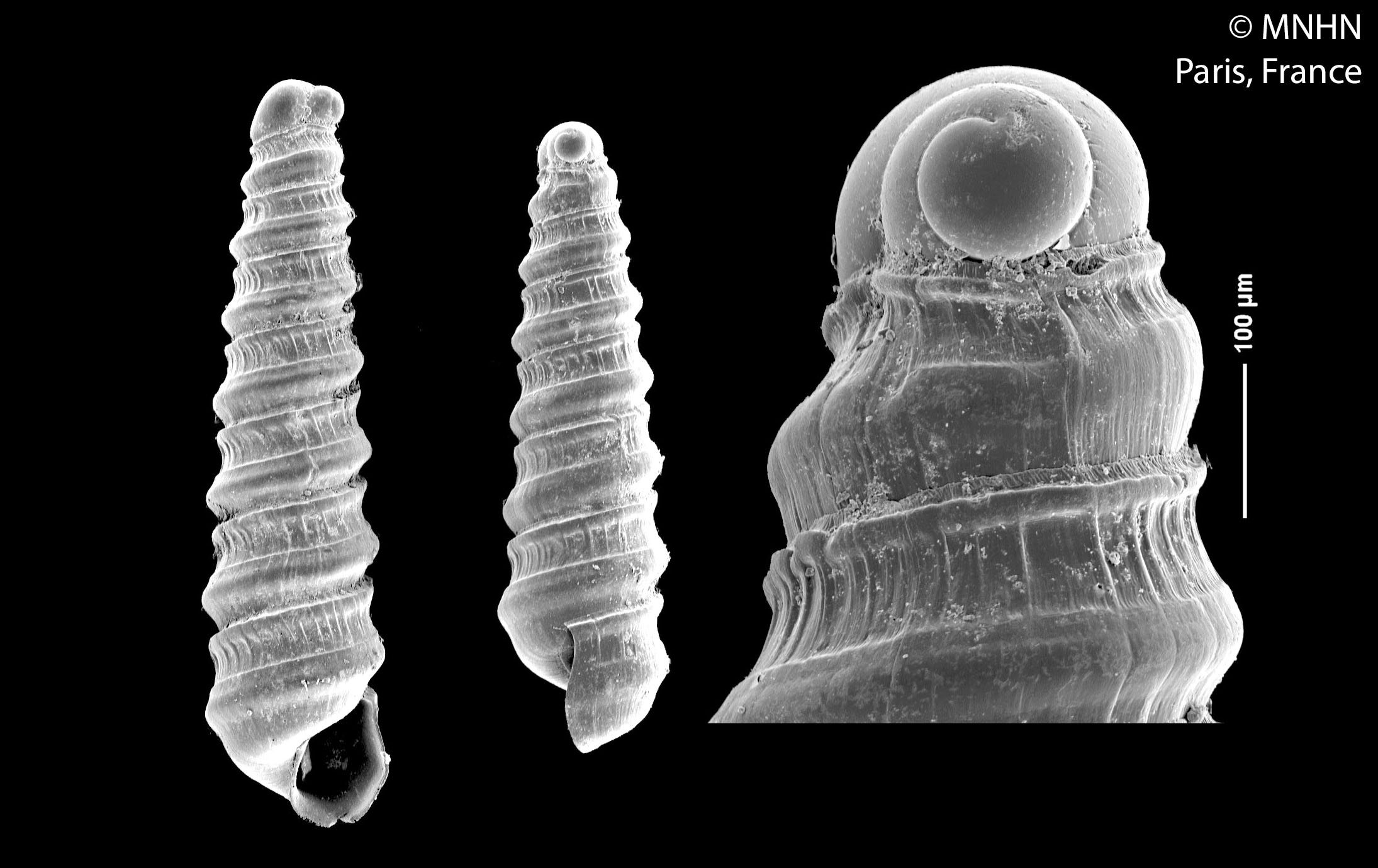
- Shell of Hamarilla amoebaea (specimen at MNHN, Paris)

Scientific classification
- Kingdom: Animalia
- Phylum: Mollusca
- Class: Gastropoda
- Superfamily: Pyramidelloidea
- Family: Pyramidellidae
- Subfamily: Turbonillinae
- Genus: Hamarilla.Eames & Wilkins, 1957

Type species
- † Hamarilla bicarinata Eames & Wilkins, 1957

Synonyms
- Zonella Laseron, 1959

= Hamarilla =

Genus of molluscs

Hamarilla is a genus of sea snails, marine gastropod mollusks in the family Pyramidellidae, the pyrams and their allies.

== Distribution ==
This marine genus occurs off the Solomon Islands and off Hong Kong.

== Species ==
- Hamarilla amoebaea (R. B. Watson, 1886)

Species brought into synonymy

- Hamarilla bicarinata Eames & Wilkins, 1957 † : synonym of Hamarilla amoebaea (R. B. Watson, 1886)
- Hamarilla coacta (R. B. Watson, 1886) : synonym of Koloonella coacta (R. B. Watson, 1886)
