= Bacteridium bermudense =

Scientific classification
- Kingdom: Animalia
- Phylum: Mollusca
- Class: Gastropoda
- Family: Pyramidellidae
- Genus: Bacteridium
- Species: B. bermudense

Binomial name
- Bacteridium bermudense (Dall & Bartsch, 1911)

Synonyms
- Ebala bartschi (Aguayo & Rehder, 1936); Ebala bermudense (Dall & Bartsch, 1911); Eulimella bermudense (Dall & Bartsch, 1911); Careliopsis bermudense (Dall & Bartsch, 1911); Turbonilla bartschi Aguayo & Rehder, 1936; Turbonilla bermudensis Dall & Bartsch, 1911; Turbonilla (Careliopsis) bartschi Aguayo & Rehder, 1936, Turbonilla (Careliopsis) bermudensis Dall & Bartsch, 1911 (basionym)

Species of gastropod

Bacteridium bermudense is a species of sea snail, a marine gastropod mollusk in the family Pyramidellidae, the pyrams and their allies. The species remains within the Bacteridium genus of gastropods, with the exception of the other three related species being Bacteridium carinatum, Bacteridium resticulum and Bacteridium vittatum.

== Description ==
The length of the shell measures approximately 2.5 mm, other species within this genus all measure roughly the same measurements.

== Distribution ==
This species occurs in many geographical locations around vast marine terrains throughout the Caribbean Sea and the Gulf of Mexico, these include the following locations:

- Aruba, an island immediately north of the South American country of Venezuela. Coordinates: (12°30′N 69°58′W)
- Bonaire, a Caribbean island immediately due north of Venezuela, and lies east of Aruba. Coordinates: (12°11′N 68°15′W)
- Caribbean Sea, a large sea covering approximately 2,754,000 km^{2} (1,063,000 sq. mi.) Coordinates: (15°N 75°W)
- Cayman Islands, a small group of islands lying within the Caribbean Sea, southwest of Cuba. Coordinates: (19°20′N 81°24′W)
- Colombia, a country in northwest, South America. Coordinates: (4°35′N 74°4′W)
- Cuba, a large Caribbean island, due immediately northeast of the Cayman Islands. Coordinates: (22°00′N 79°30′W)
- Curaçao, an island in the southern Caribbean Sea, with its capital, Willemstad. Coordinates: (12°11′N 69°00′W)
- Gulf of Mexico, a large marine gulf, lying adjacent to the Caribbean Sea. Coordinates: (25°N 90°W)
- Venezuela, a South American country, one of the northernmost countries of the continent. Coordinates: (10°30′N 66°58′W)
