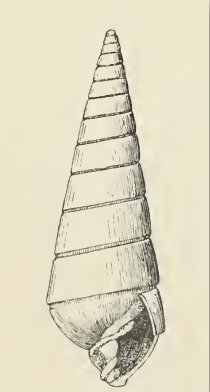
- Drawing of a shell of Longchaeus conicus

Scientific classification
- Kingdom: Animalia
- Phylum: Mollusca
- Class: Gastropoda
- Family: Pyramidellidae
- Genus: Longchaeus
- Species: L. conicus

Binomial name
- Longchaeus conicus C.B. Adams, 1852

Synonyms
- Pyramidella (Longchaeus) conica C.B. Adams, 1852; Pyramidella conica C. B. Adams, 1852

= Longchaeus conicus =

Species of gastropod

Longchaeus conicus is a species of sea snail, a marine gastropod mollusk in the family Pyramidellidae, the pyrams and their allies.

== Description ==
The shell has a very regularly elongate, conic shape. The early whorls are flesh-colored; the later ones light brown with an occasional varix of flesh color. The length of the shell measures 13 mm. There are at least 2½ whorls in the protoconch. They are depressed helicoid, having their axis almost at right angles to that of the succeeding turns, in the first of which they are about half immersed. The thirteen whorls of the teleoconch are decidedly flattened, slightly shouldered and weakly crenulated at the summit. They are marked with a strong peripheral sulcus which is crossed by numerous axial threads. The periphery of the body whorl is slightly angulated. The base of the shell is short, and well rounded. It is provided with a strong fasciole at the insertion of the columella. The entire surface of the spire and the base is marked by numerous exceedingly fine lines of growth only. The aperture is oval. The posterior angle is acute. The outer lip of the specimen is fractured, reinforced within by five slender lirations. The columella is strong, and slightly revolute. The posterior lamella is very strong; the anterior two much weaker and much more oblique. The parietal wall is glazed with a faint callus.

== Distribution ==
This marine species occurs in the Pacific Ocean off Panama Bay.
