= Striarcana cryptolira =

Scientific classification
- Kingdom: Animalia
- Phylum: Mollusca
- Class: Gastropoda
- Family: Pyramidellidae
- Genus: Striarcana
- Species: S. cryptolira

Binomial name
- Striarcana cryptolira Laws, 1937

Species of gastropod

Striarcana cryptolira is a species of sea snail, a marine gastropod mollusk in the family Pyramidellidae, the pyrams and their allies.
