= Careliopsis bahiensis =

Scientific classification
- Kingdom: Animalia
- Phylum: Mollusca
- Class: Gastropoda
- Family: Pyramidellidae
- Genus: Careliopsis
- Species: C. bahiensis

Binomial name
- Careliopsis bahiensis (Castellanos, 1982)

Synonyms
- Eulimella (Careliopsis) bahiense Castellanos, 1982; Eulimella bahiensis Castellanos, 1982); bahiensis (Castellanos, 1982)

Species of gastropod

Careliopsis bahiensis is a species of sea snail, a marine gastropod mollusk in the family Pyramidellidae, the pyrams and their allies.

Originally described as being within Eulimella, it was revised in November 2011 to Turbonilla. A second revision in 2019 moved it to Careliopsis.

The shell grows to a length of 5 mm. This species occurs in the Atlantic Ocean off Argentina.
