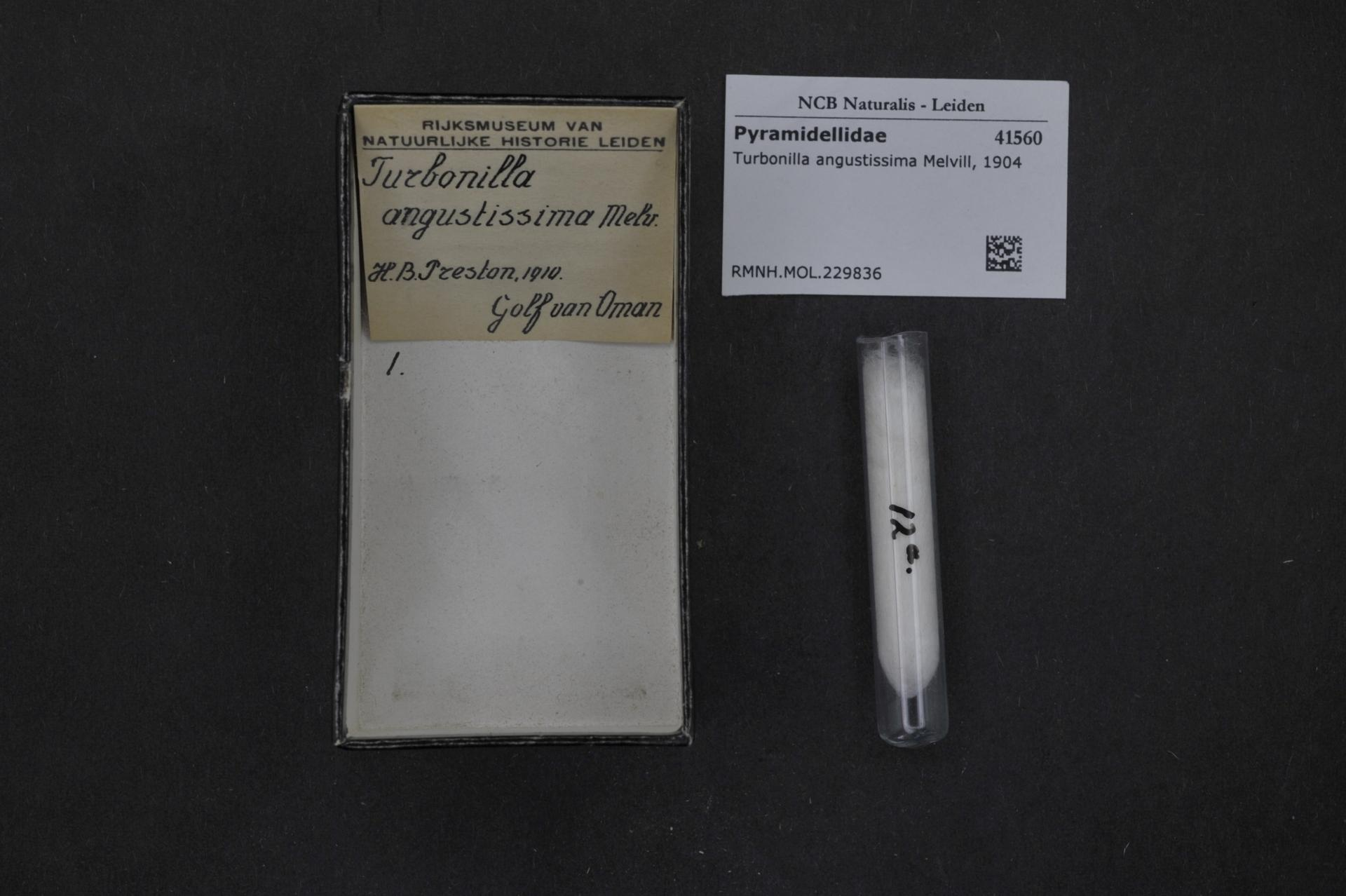
- Nisiturris angustissima (specimen at Naturalis Biodiversity Center)

Scientific classification
- Kingdom: Animalia
- Phylum: Mollusca
- Class: Gastropoda
- Family: Pyramidellidae
- Genus: Nisiturris
- Species: N. angustissima

Binomial name
- Nisiturris angustissima (Melvill, 1904)

Synonyms
- Chemnitzia (Nisiturris) angustissima (Melvill, 1904); Turbonilla angustissima Melvill, 1904 (original combination)

= Nisiturris angustissima =

Species of gastropod

Nisiturris angustissima is a species of sea snail, a marine gastropod mollusk in the family Pyramidellidae, the pyrams and their allies.

== Distribution ==
This species occurs in the Gulf of Oman
