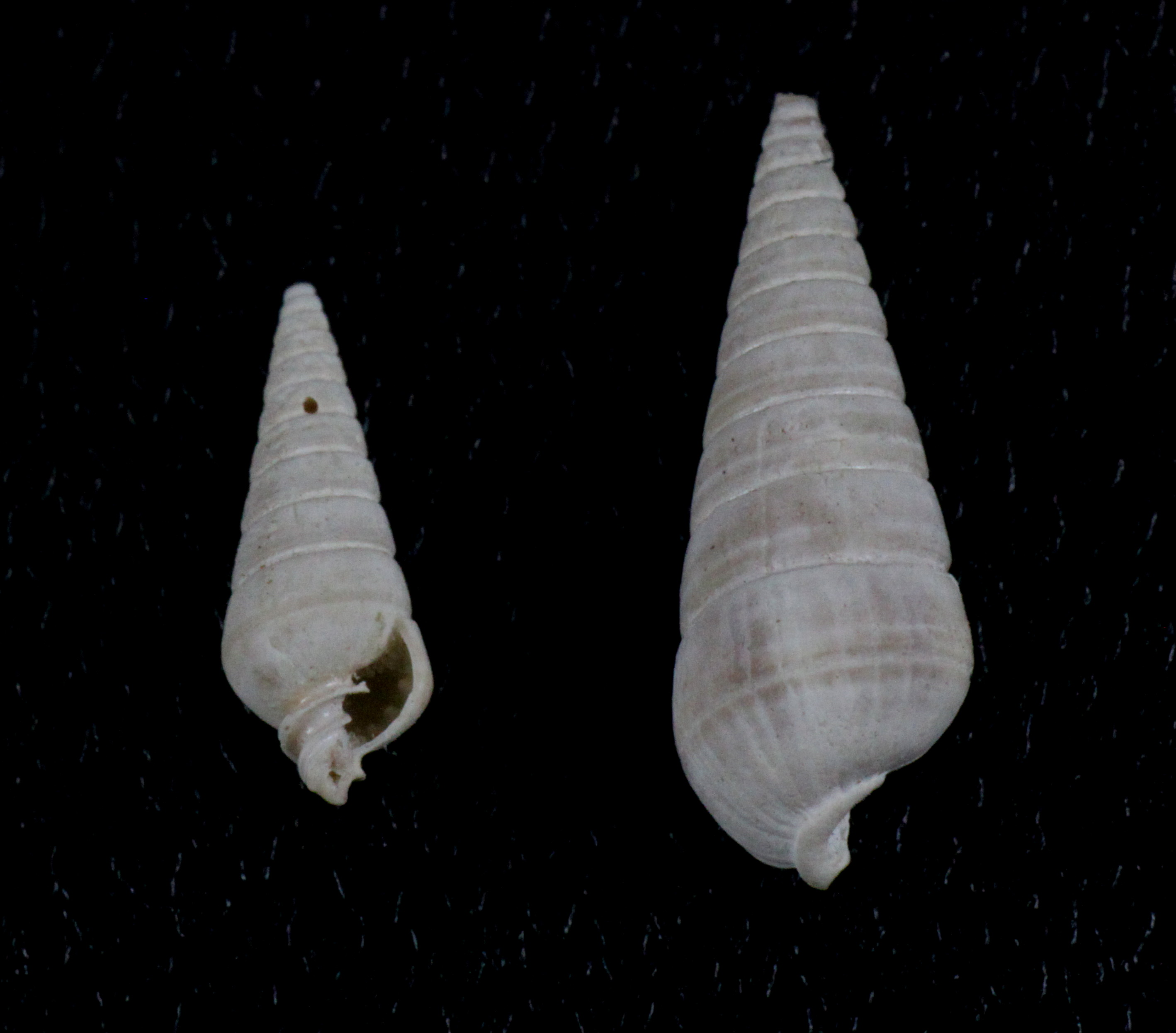
- Two views of a shell of Longchaeus suturalis

Scientific classification
- Kingdom: Animalia
- Phylum: Mollusca
- Class: Gastropoda
- Subcohort: Panpulmonata
- Superfamily: Pyramidelloidea
- Family: Pyramidellidae
- Genus: Longchaeus; Mörch, 1875

Type species
- Pyramidella punctata Schubert & Wagner, 1829

Synonyms
- † Callolongchaeus Dall, 1903; Lonchaeus (misspelling); Obeliscus (Longchaeus) Mörch, 1875 (original rank); Pharcidella Dall, 1889; Pyramidella (Longchaeus) Mörch, 1875; Pyramidella (Pharcidella) Dall, 1889; Pyramidella (Voluspa) Dall & Bartsch, 1904; Voluspa (gastropod) Dall & Bartsch, 1904; Wingenella Laseron, 1959

= Longchaeus =

Genus of sea snails

Longchaeus is a genus of sea snails, marine gastropod mollusks in the family Pyramidellidae, the pyrams and their allies.

== Species ==
Species within the genus Longchaeus include:

- Longchaeus achates (A. Gould, 1853)
- Longchaeus acus (Gmelin, 1791)
- Longchaeus adamsi (Carpenter, 1864)
- Longchaeus auricoma (Dall, 1889)
- Longchaeus bicolor Menke, 1854
- † Longchaeus canaliculatus (Gabb, 1873)
- Longchaeus candidus (Mörch, 1875)
- Longchaeus conicus (C. B. Adams, 1852)
- Longchaeus eburneus (Laseron, 1959)
- Longchaeus folinii (Dall, 1889)
- Longchaeus inopinatus (Schander, 1994)
- Longchaeus insularum (Pilsbry, 1922)
- † Longchaeus jamaicensis (Dall, 1896)
- Longchaeus maculosus (Lamarck, 1822)
- Longchaeus mazatlanicus (Dall & Bartsch, 1909)
- † Longchaeus menadensis (Schepman, 1907)
- † Longchaeus obtusatus (O. Semper, 1861)
- Longchaeus obtusus (Laseron, 1959)
- † Longchaeus olssoni (Maury, 1917)
- † Longchaeus plicosus (Bronn, 1838)
- Longchaeus suturalis (H. C. Lea, 1843)
- Longchaeus turritus (A. Adams, 1854)
- † Longchaeus unisulcatus (Dujardin, 1837)

Species brought into synonymy

- Longchaeus calesi Bartsch, 1955: synonym of Longchaeus suturalis (H. C. Lea, 1843)
- Longchaeus canaliculatus (Sowerby II, 1874): synonym of Longchaeus insularum (Pilsbry, 1922)
- † Longchaeus marionae Bartsch, 1955: synonym of Longchaeus suturalis (H. C. Lea, 1843)
- Longchaeus pricena (Laseron, 1959): synonym of Longchaeus obtusus (Laseron, 1959)
- Longchaeus punctatus (Schubert & J. A. Wagner, 1829): synonym of Longchaeus acus (Gmelin, 1791)
- Longchaeus schanderi (van Aartsen, Gittenberger & Goud, 1998): synonym of Pyramidella inopinata (Schander, 1994)
- Longchaeus sulcatus (A. Adams, 1854): synonym of Longchaeus maculosus (Lamarck, 1822)
