= Striarcana tauranga =

Scientific classification
- Kingdom: Animalia
- Phylum: Mollusca
- Class: Gastropoda
- Family: Pyramidellidae
- Genus: Striarcana
- Species: S. tauranga

Binomial name
- Striarcana tauranga Laws, 1937

Species of gastropod

Striarcana tauranga is a species of sea snail, a marine gastropod mollusk in the family Pyramidellidae, the pyrams and their allies.
