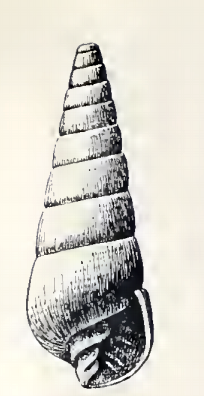
- Drawing of a shell of Longchaeus auricoma

Scientific classification
- Kingdom: Animalia
- Phylum: Mollusca
- Class: Gastropoda
- Family: Pyramidellidae
- Genus: Longchaeus
- Species: L. auricoma

Binomial name
- Longchaeus auricoma (Dall, 1889)

Synonyms
- Pyramidella (Voluspa) auricoma Dall, 1889 ·; Pyramidella auricoma Dall, 1889

= Longchaeus auricoma =

Species of gastropod

Longchaeus auricoma is a species of sea snail, a marine gastropod mollusc in the family Pyramidellidae, the pyrams and their allies.

== Description ==
The shell has a regularly elongate-conic shape. It is yellowish-white, with fine golden yellow spiral lines between the sutures and on the base. Its length measures 10.6 mm. The whorls of the protoconch are small, deeply obliquely immersed in the first succeeding turn. The ten whorls of the teleoconch are well rounded, feebly shouldered at the summit, scarcely at all contracted at the sutures. The sutures are weakly impressed. The periphery and the base of the body whorl are well rounded and smooth. The aperture is irregularly oval. The outer lip is thin. It is reinforced deeply within by five strong spiral cords, one of which is at the periphery, two divide the space between this and the summit into three equal parts, and two a little less strong are on the base. The columella is strong and straight. The posterior fold is oblique, very strong and lamellar. The anterior two are about one-fourth as high as the posterior, very oblique. The parietal wall is glazed by a thin callus.

== Distribution ==
This marine species occurs in the Gulf of California and off Mazatlán, Mexico.
