= Longchaeus candidus =

Scientific classification
- Kingdom: Animalia
- Phylum: Mollusca
- Class: Gastropoda
- Family: Pyramidellidae
- Genus: Longchaeus
- Species: L. candidus

Binomial name
- Longchaeus candidus (Mörch, 1875)

Synonyms
- Pyramidella candida Mørch, 1875; Pyramidella (Longchaeus) candida (Mörch, 1875)

Species of gastropod

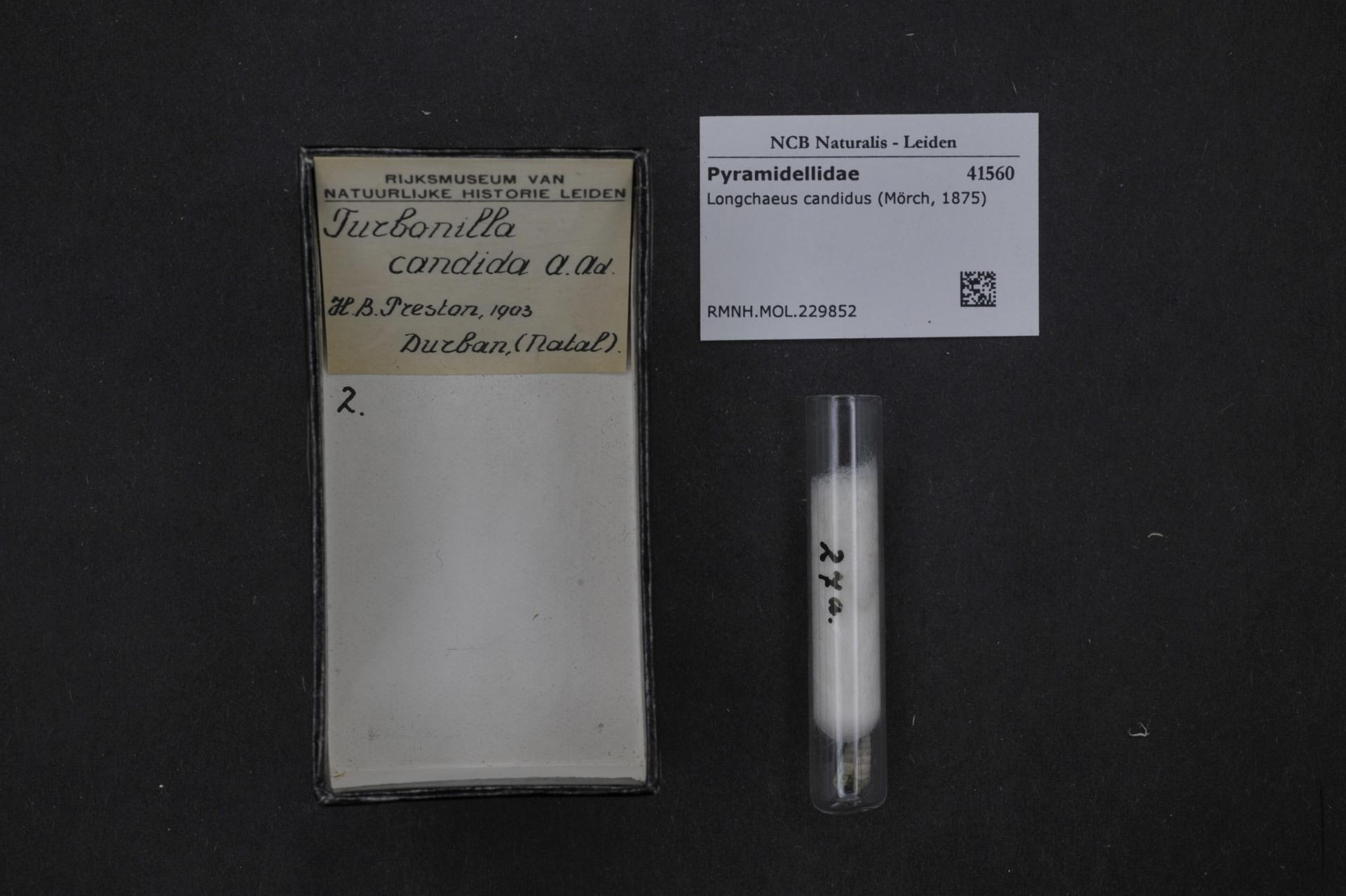

Longchaeus candidus is a species of sea snail, a marine gastropod mollusk in the family Pyramidellidae, the pyrams and their allies.

== Description ==
=== External shell and structure ===
The elongate conical shell of L. candidus grows to a length of 14 mm. L. candidus is originally described (as Obeliscus (Longchaeus) candidus) as having a narrow, white glossy or translucent shell with a median groove. The shell has a canaliculate suture bilaterally, a subtly crenulated dentate, and incremental lyrae. L. candidus has two internal dentate lyrae. Specimen photos show L. candidus as having approximately 10-12 whorls that are gently convex. The whorls have an axial sculpture of significantly impressed lines. The sutures between whorls are similarly impressed.

=== Live snail ===
Species in the family Pyramidellidae have an extensible proboscis that can be used to pierce their prey, but lack a functional radula.

== Distribution and habitat ==
This species occurs in the following locations:

- Gulf of Mexico
- Caribbean Sea : Panama, Virgin Islands
- in the Atlantic Ocean off West Africa, North Carolina, the Bahamas, North Brazil

L. candidus is a marine benthic species. Specimens are primarily documented as being found in waters less than 60 meters below the surface, with a group of specimens also being found at between 170-180 meters below the surface.

== Life habits ==
=== Diet ===
L. candidus, like other species in Pyramidellidae, are carnivorous ectoparasites. Species in Pyramidellidae feed primarily on clams, oysters, polychaetes, and occasionally other gastropods.

=== Reproduction ===
Species in the family Pyramidellidae are simultaneous hermaphrodites and reproduce sexually.

=== Locomotion ===
L. candidus moves by mucus mediated gliding. Pyramidellidae species are primarily sedentary, attaching themselves to their host to feed for extended periods of time.
