= Kejdonia =

Scientific classification
- Kingdom: Animalia
- Phylum: Mollusca
- Class: Gastropoda
- Family: Pyramidellidae
- Subfamily: Turbonillinae
- Tribe: Eulimellini
- Genus: Kejdonia; Mifsud, 1999

Synonyms
- Pseudographis Mifsud, 1998 (preoccupied by Pseudographis Balinsky 1989 (Lepidoptera); Kejdonia is a replacement name); Saccoina Oberling, 1971

Genus of gastropods

Kejdonia is a genus of sea snails, marine gastropod mollusks in the family Pyramidellidae, the pyrams and their allies.

== Species ==
Species within the genus Kejdonia include:

- Kejdonia cachiai (Mifsud, 1998)
