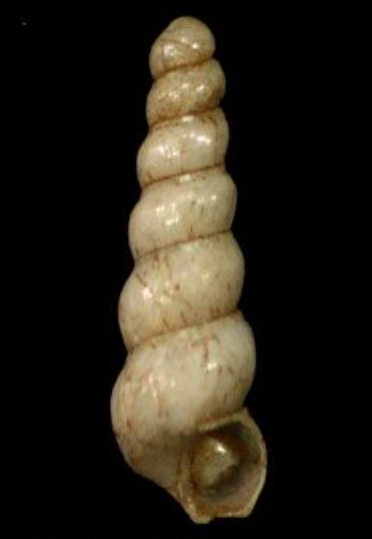
- Shell of Atomiscala islandica (specimen at the Natural History Museum Rotterdam)

Scientific classification
- Kingdom: Animalia
- Phylum: Mollusca
- Class: Gastropoda
- Family: Cimidae
- Genus: Atomiscala
- Species: A. islandica

Binomial name
- Atomiscala islandica Warén, 1989

= Atomiscala islandica =

Species of gastropod

Atomiscala islandica is a species of sea snail, a marine gastropod mollusc in the family Cimidae.

== Description ==
Shell 2-4 mm; spire acicular, with 6-8 convex whorls; aperture oval, above somewhat truncated by the previous whorl; sculpture: practically smooth; shell dirty white.

== Distribution ==
This marine species is known from the Atlantic Ocean around Iceland. and from the deep sea off Ireland.
