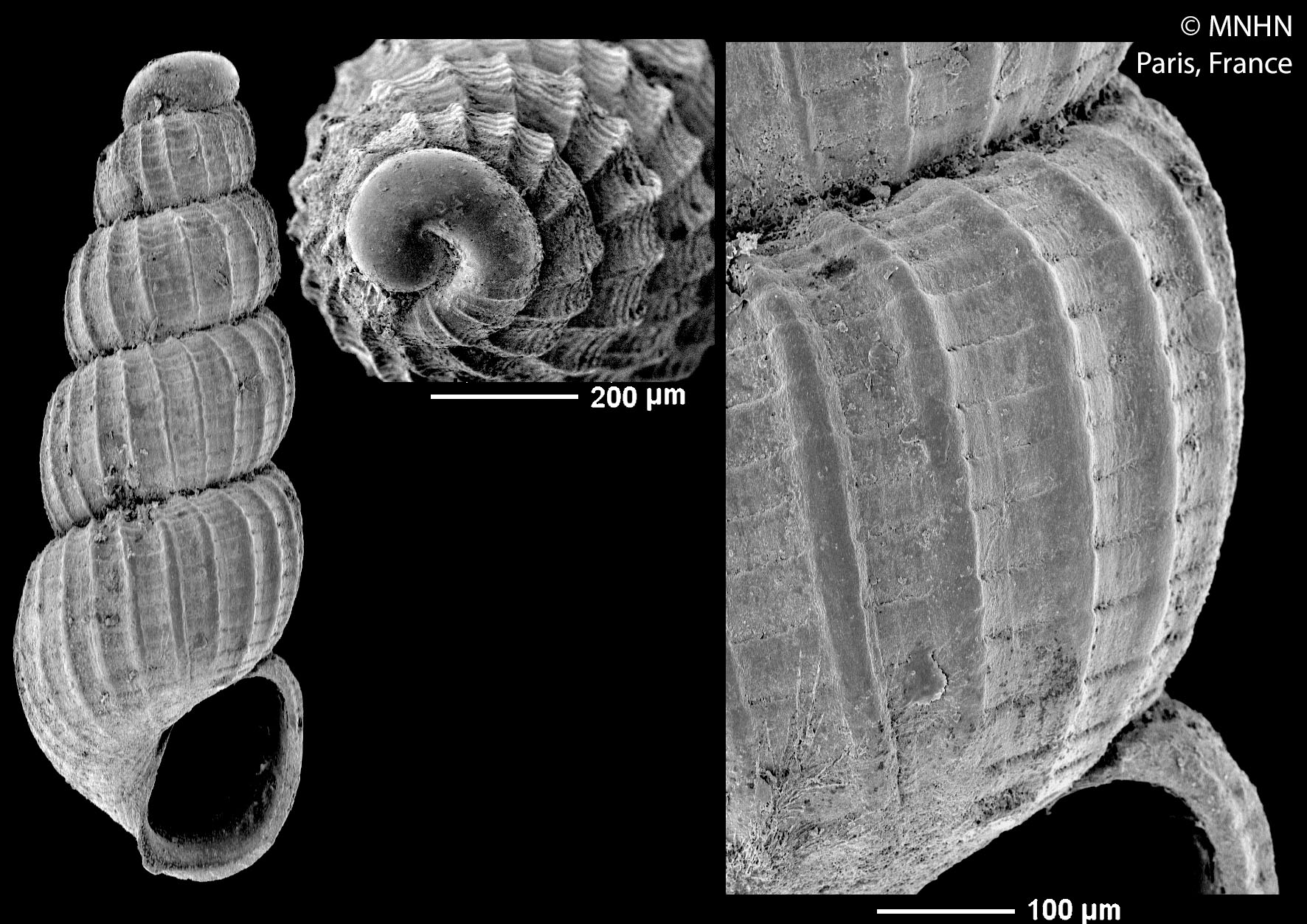
- Shell of Rissopsetia altispira (specimen at MNHN, Paris)

Scientific classification
- Kingdom: Animalia
- Phylum: Mollusca
- Class: Gastropoda
- Subcohort: Panpulmonata
- Superfamily: Pyramidelloidea
- Family: Pyramidellidae
- Genus: Rissopsetia; Dell, 1956

Type species
- Rissopsetia maoria Dell, R.K., 1956

= Rissopsetia =

Genus of gastropods

Rissopsetia is a genus of sea snails, marine gastropod molluscs in the family Pyramidellidae.

== Species ==
Species within the genus Rissopsetia include:

- Rissopsetia altispira Ponder, 1974
- Rissopsetia attenuata Peñas & Rolán, 2017
- Rissopsetia basilica Peñas & Rolán, 2017
- Rissopsetia delicata Peñas & Rolán, 2017
- Rissopsetia elegans Peñas & Rolán, 2017
- Rissopsetia gavisa (Melvill, 1896)
- Rissopsetia gracilis (W. R. B. Oliver, 1915)
- Rissopsetia hummelincki Faber, 1984
- Rissopsetia islandica Warén, 1989
- Rissopsetia maccoyi (Tenison-Woods, 1876)
- Rissopsetia maoria Dell, 1956
- † Rissopsetia nukumaruensis (Laws, 1940)
- Rissopsetia perstriata Peñas & Rolán, 2017
- Rissopsetia reticuli Peñas & Rolán, 2017
- Rissopsetia rogeri Peñas & Rolán, 2017
- Rissopsetia solomonensis Peñas & Rolán, 2017
- Rissopsetia spirarum Peñas & Rolán, 2017
- Rissopsetia ultima Peñas & Rolán, 2017
- Rissopsetia vanuatuensis Peñas & Rolán, 2017
