= Rissopsetia islandica =

Scientific classification
- Kingdom: Animalia
- Phylum: Mollusca
- Class: Gastropoda
- Family: Pyramidellidae
- Genus: Rissopsetia
- Species: R. islandica

Binomial name
- Rissopsetia islandica Warén, 1989

Species of gastropod

Rissopsetia islandica is a species of sea snail, a marine gastropod mollusk in the family Pyramidellidae, the pyrams and their allies.

== Distribution ==
This species occurs in the following locations:

- European waters (ERMS scope)
