= Rissopsetia hummelincki =

Scientific classification
- Kingdom: Animalia
- Phylum: Mollusca
- Class: Gastropoda
- Family: Pyramidellidae
- Genus: Rissopsetia
- Species: R. hummelincki

Binomial name
- Rissopsetia hummelincki Faber, 1984

Species of gastropod

Rissopsetia hummelincki is a species of sea snail, a marine gastropod mollusk in the family Pyramidellidae, the pyrams and their allies.

== Distribution ==
This species occurs in the following locations:

- Aruba
- Bonaire
- Caribbean Sea
- Cayman Islands
- Cuba
- Curaçao
- Gulf of Mexico
- Venezuela
