= Sayellini =

Scientific classification
- Kingdom: Animalia
- Phylum: Mollusca
- Class: Gastropoda
- Family: Pyramidellidae
- Subfamily: Pyramidellinae
- Tribe: Sayellini; Wise, 1996

Genera
- See text

Diversity
- 2 genera

Synonyms
- Sayellinae

Tribe of gastropods

Sayellini is a taxonomic tribe of minute ectoparasitic sea snails, marine gastropod molluscs, or micromollusks, in the very large family Pyramidellidae, the pyrams and their allies.

== Taxonomy ==
The subfamily Sayellinae is one of eleven recognised in the family Pyramidellidae, according to the taxonomy of Ponder & Lindberg (1997).

According to Schander, Van Aartsen & Corgen (1999) there are only two genera in this sub-family.

In the taxonomy of Bouchet & Rocroi (2005), this subfamily has been downgraded to the rank of tribe Sayellini in the subfamily Pyramidellinae.

== Genera ==
- Sayella Dall, 1885 - type genus of the tribe Sayellini
- Petitella Wise, 1996
