= Atomiscala =

Scientific classification
- Kingdom: Animalia
- Phylum: Mollusca
- Class: Gastropoda
- Family: Cimidae
- Genus: Atomiscala de Boury, 1909

Synonyms
- Scala (Atomiscala) de Boury, 1909 superseded rank

Genus of gastropods

Atomiscala is a genus of sea snails, marine gastropod molluscs in the family Cimidae.

== Characteristics ==
These are very small sea snails, with shell lengths typically only a few millimeters. They are slender and needle- to spindle-shaped). The protoconch is bulbous and inflated. he transition from protoconch to teleoconch is usually gentle. This characteristic immediately separates it from many pyramidellids. The whorls are slightly ventricose with impressed sutures. The surface shows extremely fine longitudinal lirae (when viewed under magnification), though in some specimens these are nearly or completely obsolete. The columella is simple, without folds.

While superficially similar to tiny pyramidellid gastropods (like Eulimella and Turbonilla), the genus has been reassessed and placed in Cimidae based on shell and taxonomic studies.

== Distribution ==
The genus is overall marine, but not globally widespread. Records are from cooler temperate to subpolar regions in both northern and southern hemispheres: around Iceland and in the Southern Atlantic off Argentina and Tierra del Fuego.

== Species ==
- † Atomiscala gosseleti (Briart & Cornet, 1873)
- Atomiscala islandica Warén, 1989
- Atomiscala xenophyes (Melvill & Standen, 1912)
