= Bacteridium carinatum =

Scientific classification
- Kingdom: Animalia
- Phylum: Mollusca
- Class: Gastropoda
- Family: Pyramidellidae
- Genus: Bacteridium
- Species: B. carinatum

Binomial name
- Bacteridium carinatum (de Folin, 1870)

Synonyms
- Anisocycla eulimoides Fekih, 1969; Eulimella (Bacteridium) carinata (de Folin, 1870); Eulimella carinata de Folin, 1870

Species of gastropod

Bacteridium carinatum is a species of sea snail, a marine gastropod mollusk in the family Pyramidellidae and the genus Bacteridium.

== Distribution ==
The vast majority of this species is distributed within marine terrain off the west coast of Africa (Cape Verdes) and its countries on the west coast, Angola, Namibia, Gabon, and in the demersal zone of the Mediterranean Sea

== Sources ==
- Sealifebase.org: Bacteridium carinatum
- Vaught, K.C. (1989). A classification of the living Mollusca. American Malacologists: Melbourne, FL (USA). ISBN 0-915826-22-4. XII, 195 pp.
- Rolán E., 2005. Malacological Fauna From The Cape Verde Archipelago. Part 1, Polyplacophora and Gastropoda.
- Templado, J. and R. Villanueva, 2010 Checklist of Phylum Mollusca. pp. 148–198 In Coll, M., et al., 2010. The biodiversity of the Mediterranean Sea: estimates, patterns, and threats. PLoS ONE 5(8):36pp.
