= Eulimellini =

Scientific classification
- Kingdom: Animalia
- Phylum: Mollusca
- Class: Gastropoda
- Family: Pyramidellidae
- Subfamily: Turbonillinae
- Tribe: Eulimellini; Saurin, 1958

Synonyms
- Eulimellinae

Tribe of gastropods

Eulimellini is a tribe of minute sea snails, marine gastropod molluscs in the family Pyramidellidae, the pyrams and their allies.

== Taxonomy ==
According to Schander, Van Aartsen & Corgan (1999) there are 17 genera in the Eulimellinae.

As "Eulimellinae", this taxon was previously one of eleven recognised subfamilies of the Pyramidellidae (according to the taxonomy of Ponder & Lindberg, 1997).

In the taxonomy of Bouchet & Rocroi (2005), this subfamily Cingulininae was downgraded to the rank of tribe, as Eulimellini, belonging to the subfamily Turbonillinae.

== Genera ==
Genera within the tribe Eulimellini include:

- Bacteridella Saurin, 1959
- Bacteridium Thiele, 1929
- Belonidium Cossmann, 1893
- Careliopsis Mörch, 1875
- Discobasis Cossmann, 1888
- Eulimella Forbes & MacAndrew, 1846 - type genus of the tribe Eulimellini
- Instarella Laseron, 1959
- Kejdonia Mifsud, 1999
- Koloonella Laseron, 1959
- Latavia Laseron, 1951
- Loxoptyxis Cossmann, 1888
- Paradoxella Laseron, 1951
- Raulostraca Oliver, 1915
- Saccoina Dall & Bartsch, 1904
- Tathrella Laseron, 1959
- Terelimella Laws, 1938
- Visma Dall & Bartsch, 1904

== See also ==
- Turbonillinae#Problematic genera within the family Turbonillinae
