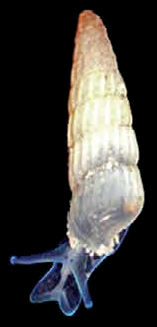
- live Turbonilla acutissima
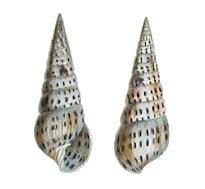
- Two views of a shells of Pyramidella acus

Scientific classification
- Domain: Eukaryota
- Kingdom: Animalia
- Phylum: Mollusca
- Class: Gastropoda
- Subcohort: Panpulmonata
- Superfamily: Pyramidelloidea; J. E. Gray, 1840

= Pyramidelloidea =

Superfamily of gastropods

Pyramidelloidea is a superfamily of mostly very small sea snails, marine gastropod mollusks and micromollusks within the clade Panpulmonata.

This is a voluminous taxon: above the species level close to 400 named taxa are referred to this gastropod superfamily.

Pyramidelloidea has both fossil and recent members. They live as ectoparasites on bivalve molluscs and polychaete worms, and have a sharp, piercing stylet instead of a radula.

== Distribution ==
This taxon is found worldwide.

== Taxonomy ==
=== 1999 taxonomy ===
Taxonomy by Schander, Van Aartsen & Corgan (1999):

- Superfamily Pyramidelloidea Gray, 1840
  - Family Amathinidae Ponder, 1987
  - Family Ebalidae Warén, 1994 - synonym: Anisocyclidae van Aartsen, 1995
  - Family Odostomiidae Pelseneer, 1928
    - Subfamily Odostomiinae Pelseneer, 1928
    - Subfamily Chrysallidinae Saurin, 1958
    - Subfamily Odostomellinae Saurin, 1958
    - Subfamily Cyclostremellinae Moore, 1966
  - Family Pyramidellidae J. E. Gray, 1840
    - Subfamily Pyramidellinae J.E. Gray, 1840
    - Subfamily Sayellinae Wise, 1996
  - Family Syrnolidae Saurin, 1958
    - Subfamily Syrnolinae Saurin, 1958
    - Subfamily Tiberiinae Saurin, 1958
  - Family Turbonillidae Bronn, 1849
    - Subfamily Turbonillinae Bronn, 1849
    - Subfamily Eulimellinae Saurin, 1958
    - Subfamily Cingulininae Saurin, 1959

=== 2005 taxonomy ===
Pyramidelloidea has been classified within the informal group Lower Heterobranchia in the taxonomy of Bouchet & Rocroi (2005).

Taxonomy of Bouchet & Rocroi, 2005:

- Superfamily Pyramidelloidea
  - Family Pyramidellidae
  - Family Amathinidae
  - † Family Heteroneritidae
  - Family Murchisonellidae

=== 2010 taxonomy ===
Jörger et al. (2010) have redefined major groups within the Heterobranchia and they moved Pyramidelloidea to Panpulmonata.

== Pyramidelloidean genera of uncertain familial position ==
- Bidentata de Castellanos, 1982
- Calyptopolyptychia Gougerot, 1968
- Laeviselica Gougerot & Le Renard, 1977
- Lysacme Dall & Bartsch, 1904
- Microthyca A. Adams, 1863
- Oopyramis Thiele, 1930
- Sulcorinella Dall & Bartsch, 1904
