= List of Odostomia species =

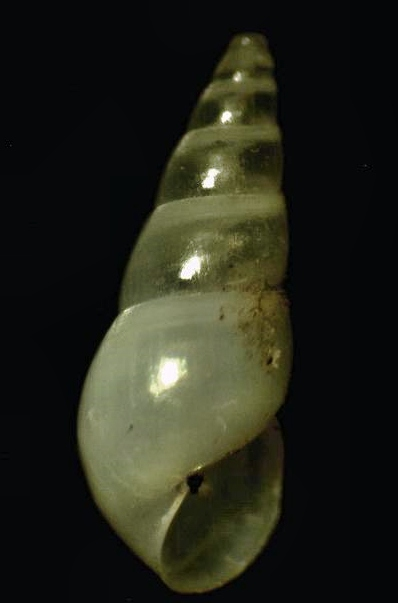
Odostomia fusulus Monterosato, 1878

Odostomia is the most speciose genus of minute sea snails, pyramidellid gastropod mollusks. This genus is placed in the family Pyramidellidae in the subfamily Odostomiinae. There are several hundred species in this diverse genus (Schander et al. 1999)

Most of the description of species in the genus Odostomia was carried out by Dall & Bartsch in 1909. Many of the described species are however suspected of being synonyms, or are proven synonyms.

The genus Odostomia Fleming, 1813 was used by 19th century authors, particularly in the European literature, for most of the smaller Pyramidellidae. It is still a catchall for most small pyramidellids lacking both axial and spiral sculpture. Some authors, e.g. Høisæter (2014), Peñas, Rolán & Swinnen (2014) and Giannuzzi-Savelli et al. (2014) who are here followed have attempted to redistribute some of the species, but there are still many species remaining unduly under Odostomia. For these, the database WoRMS has refrained from making new combinations not backed by (or implicit from) a published source but, unless otherwise noted, the species that were already "accepted" under a subgenus now raised to full genus have been marked as "accepted" under that full genus.

The European and American species of Odostomia differ in several anatomical and shell characteristics. They are therefore likely to be assigned to different genera.

== Species ==
Species within the genus Odostomia include:

=== A ===
- Odostomia aartseni Nofroni, 1988
- Odostomia achatinella A. Adams, 1860
- Odostomia acrybia Dall & Bartsch, 1909
- Odostomia acuta Jeffreys, 1848
- Odostomia acutangula Suter, 1908
- Odostomia acutidens Dall, 1884
- Odostomia aepynota Dall & Bartsch, 1909
- Odostomia aequisculpta Carpenter, 1864
- Odostomia aethra Bartsch, 1915
- Odostomia albuquerqueae Peñas, Rolán & Swinnen, 2014
- Odostomia aleutica Dall & Bartsch, 1909
- Odostomia alia Peñas & Rolán, 1999
- Odostomia aliquanta Penas & Rolan, 1999
- Odostomia altina Dall & Bartsch, 1909
- Odostomia amanda Garrett, 1863
- † Odostomia amava T. Oldroyd, 1925
- Odostomia americana Dall & Bartsch, 1904
- Odostomia amianta Dall & Bartsch, 1907
- Odostomia amilda Dall & Bartsch, 1909
- Odostomia anabathmis Melvill, 1910
- † Odostomia ancisa (Marwick, 1931)
- Odostomia andamanensis (Preston, 1908)
- Odostomia angularis Dall & Bartsch, 1907
- Odostomia antelia Melvill, 1896
- Odostomia anxia Hedley, 1909
- Odostomia aomori Nomura, 1938
- Odostomia apexdemissus Peñas, Rolán & Swinnen, 2014
- Odostomia armata Carpenter, 1857
- † Odostomia arowhana (Marwick, 1931)
- Odostomia aspera Nomura, 1938
- Odostomia astricta Dall & Bartsch, 1907
- Odostomia ata Bartsch, 1926
- Odostomia atossa Dall, 1908
- Odostomia aucklandica Laws, 1939
- Odostomia audax Baker, Hanna & Strong, 1928
- Odostomia avellana Carpenter, 1864
- † Odostomia awatumida Laws, 1939
- Odostomia ayukawaensis Nomura, 1938
- Odostomia azteca Strong & Hertlein, 1939

=== B ===
- Odostomia babylonica Winckworth, 1940
- Odostomia bachia Bartsch, 1927
- Odostomia baldridgeae Bartsch, 1912
- Odostomia bapaulinoae Peñas, Rolán & Swinnen, 2019
- Odostomia baranoffensis Dall & Bartsch, 1909
- Odostomia barkleyensis Dall & Bartsch, 191
- Odostomia barnardi van Aartsen & Corgan, 1996
- † Odostomia bartrumi Laws, 1940
- Odostomia becki W.H. Turton, 1933
- Odostomia bentenzimana Nomura, 1937
- Odostomia benthina Dall & Bartsch, 1909
- Odostomia beringi Dall, 1871
- Odostomia bernardi (van Aartsen, Gittenberger & Goud, 1998)
- † Odostomia biangulata Laws, 1939
- Odostomia biformis Saurin, 1962
- Odostomia bismichaelis Sacco, 1892
- Odostomia bissagosensis Peñas, Rolán & Swinnen, 2014
- Odostomia boermani van Aartsen, Gittenberger E. & Goud, 1998
- Odostomia brandhorsti van Aartsen, Gittenberger & Goud, 1998
- Odostomia bruneri A. E. Verrill, 1882
- Odostomia bulbula Hedley, 1907
- Odostomia bulimulus Monterosato, 1874
- Odostomia bullata Nomura, 1937
- Odostomia bullula Gould, 1861
- Odostomia buzzurroi Peñas & Rolán, 1999

=== C ===
- Odostomia calcarella Bartsch, 1912
- Odostomia californica Dall & Bartsch, 1909
- Odostomia callimene Bartsch, 1912
- Odostomia callimorpha Dall & Bartsch, 1909
- Odostomia calliope Bartsch, 1912
- Odostomia callipyrga Dall & Bartsch, 1904
- Odostomia cana A. Adams, 1860
- Odostomia canfieldi Dall, 1908
- Odostomia capa Bartsch, 1926
- Odostomia capensis Thiele, 1925
- Odostomia capitana Dall & Bartsch, 1909
- Odostomia carinata H. Adams, 1873
- Odostomia cassandra Bartsch, 1912
- Odostomia castanea Habe, 1961
- † Odostomia castlecliffensis Laws, 1939
- Odostomia catalinensis Bartsch, 1927
- Odostomia chamorum Saurin, 1958
- Odostomia chariclea Melvill, 1910
- † Odostomia chattonensis Laws, 1939
- Odostomia chinooki Bartsch, 1927
- Odostomia chitonicola E. A. Smith, 1899
- Odostomia chordata Suter, 1908
- Odostomia churchi Smith & Gordon, 1948
- Odostomia ciguatonis Strong, 1949
- Odostomia cincta de Folin, 1879
- Odostomia cionelloides Clessin, 1902
- Odostomia circumcordata Peñas, Rolán & Swinnen, 2014
- Odostomia citrina de Folin, 1869
- † Odostomia civitella T. Oldroyd, 1925
- Odostomia clara Brazier, 1877
- Odostomia clathratula (C.B. Adams, 1852)
- Odostomia clausiliformis Carpenter, 1857
- Odostomia clavulina Fischer P., 1877
- Odostomia clementensis Bartsch, 1927
- Odostomia clementina Dall & Bartsch, 1909
- Odostomia clessini Dall & Bartsch, 1909
- Odostomia collea Bartsch, 1926
- Odostomia columbiana Dall & Bartsch, 1907
- Odostomia communis (C.B. Adams, 1852)
- Odostomia conspicua Alder, 1850
- Odostomia contabulata (Mörch, 1860)
- Odostomia contrerasi Baker, Hanna & Strong, 1928
- Odostomia cookeana Bartsch, 1910
- Odostomia corimbensis Schander, 1994
- Odostomia corintoensis Hertlein & Strong, 1951
- Odostomia coronadoensis Dall & Bartsch, 1909
- Odostomia corpulentoides Dell, 1956
- Odostomia costaricensis Hertlein & Strong, 1951
- Odostomia crassicollosa Nomura, 1937
- Odostomia crassiplicata Nomura, 1936
- Odostomia crispa (G. B. Sowerby III, 1892)
- Odostomia cryptodon Suter, 1908
- Odostomia crystallina Garrett, 1873
- Odostomia culta Dall & Bartsch, 1906
- Odostomia cumshewaensis Bartsch, 1921
- Odostomia cuspidata Garrett, 1873
- Odostomia cypria Dall & Bartsch, 1912

=== D-E ===
- Odostomia dalsumi van Aartsen, Gittenberger & Goud, 1998
- Odostomia daruma Nomura, 1938
- Odostomia dealbata (Stimpson, 1851)
- Odostomia deceptrix Dall & Bartsch, 1909
- Odostomia decouxi Saurin, 1959
- Odostomia defolinia Dall & Bartsch, 1909
- Odostomia delicatula Carpenter, 1864
- Odostomia deliciosa Dall & Bartsch, 1907
- Odostomia deplexa (Tate & May, 1900)
- Odostomia desimana Dall & Bartsch, 1904
- Odostomia desuefacta Penas & Rolan, 1999
- Odostomia dicella Bartsch, 1912
- Odostomia didyma (Verrill & Bush, 1900)
- Odostomia digitulus Penas & Rolan, 1999
- Odostomia dijkhuizeni van Aartsen, Gittenberger E. & Goud, 1998
- Odostomia dilecta Nomura, 1937
- Odostomia dinella Dall & Bartsch, 1909
- Odostomia disparilis A. E. Verrill, 1884
- Odostomia donilla Dall & Bartsch, 1909
- Odostomia dorica Melvill, 1904
- Odostomia dotella Dall & Bartsch, 1909
- Odostomia dusiensis Nomura, 1937
- Odostomia duureni (van Aartsen, Gittenberger & Goud, 1998)
- Odostomia dyma van Aartsen & Corgan, 1996
- Odostomia eburnea Angas, 1878
- Odostomia edmondi Jordan, 1920
- Odostomia effusa Carpenter, 1857
- Odostomia elata A. Adams, 1860
- Odostomia eldorana Bartsch, 1912
- Odostomia electa Jeffreys, 1883
- Odostomia elsa Dall & Bartsch, 1909
- Odostomia engbergi Bartsch, 1920
- Odostomia enora Dall & Bartsch, 1909
- Odostomia enosimensis Nomura, 1938
- Odostomia era Bartsch, 1927
- Odostomia eremita Peñas & Rolán, 1999
- Odostomia eronea Nomura, 1937
- Odostomia eruca Laseron, 1959
- Odostomia esilda Dall & Bartsch, 1909
- Odostomia eugena Dall & Bartsch, 1909
- Odostomia euglypta Jordan, 1920
- Odostomia exara Dall & Bartsch, 1907
- Odostomia exarata Carpenter, 1857
- Odostomia excelsa Dall & Bartsch, 1909
- Odostomia excisa Bartsch, 1912
- Odostomia exiguita Nomura, 1937
- Odostomia exilis Garrett, 1873
- Odostomia exiliter Peñas, Rolán & Swinnen, 2014
- Odostomia extenuata Penas & Rolan, 1999
- Odostomia eyerdami Bartsch, 1927

=== F-G ===
- Odostomia farallonensis Dall & Bartsch, 1909
- Odostomia farma Dall & Bartsch, 1909
- Odostomia fasciata Carpenter, 1857
- Odostomia fehrae (van Aartsen, Gittenberger & Goud, 1998)
- Odostomia fetella Dall & Bartsch, 1909
- Odostomia fia Bartsch, 1927
- Odostomia franciscana Bartsch, 1917
- Odostomia francoi Penas & Rolan, 1999
- Odostomia franki Peñas & Rolán, 1999
- Odostomia fujitanii Yokoyama, 1927
- Odostomia funiculustriata Penas & Rolan, 1999
- Odostomia gabrielensis Baker, Hanna & Strong, 1928
- Odostomia galapagensis Dall & Bartsch, 1909
- Odostomia gallegosiana Hertlein & Strong, 1951
- Odostomia garcerii Saurin, 1959
- Odostomia geoffreyi Laws, 1939
- Odostomia gittenbergeri van Aartsen & Corgan, 1996
- Odostomia glabra Clessin, 1902
- Odostomia glaphyra E. A. Smith, 1890
- Odostomia gloriosa Bartsch, 1912
- Odostomia gomezi Peñas, Rolán & Swinnen, 2014
- Odostomia goniostoma A. Adams, 1860
- † Odostomia gorensis Laws, 1939
- Odostomia gouldii Carpenter, 1864
- Odostomia gracilientis (Keep, 1887)
- Odostomia gradusuturae Penas & Rolan, 1999
- Odostomia grammatospira Dall & Bartsch, 1903
- Odostomia granadensis Dall & Bartsch, 1909
- † Odostomia graviapicalis Laws, 1939
- Odostomia gravida Gould, 1853
- Odostomia grijalvae Baker, Hanna & Strong, 1928
- Odostomia grippiana Bartsch, 1912
- Odostomia guatulcoensis Hertlein & Strong, 1951
- Odostomia gulicki Pilsbry, 1918

=== H-J ===
- Odostomia hagemeisteri Dall & Bartsch, 1909
- Odostomia harfordensis Dall & Bartsch, 1907
- Odostomia harukoae Nomura, 1938
- Odostomia harveyi van Aartsen & S.M. Smith, 1996
- Odostomia haurakiensis Laws, 1939
- Odostomia heathi Smith & Gordon, 1948
- Odostomia helena Bartsch, 1912
- Odostomia helga Dall & Bartsch, 1909
- Odostomia hemphilli Dall & Bartsch, 1909
- Odostomia hendersoni Bartsch, 1909
- Odostomia herilda Dall & Bartsch, 1909
- Odostomia herrerae Baker, Hanna & Strong, 1928
- Odostomia hertleini Strong, 1938
- Odostomia heterocincta Bartsch, 1912
- Odostomia hierroensis Peñas & Rolán, 1999
- Odostomia hilgendorfi Clessin, 1900
- Odostomia hipolitensis Dall & Bartsch, 1909
- Odostomia hirotamurana Nomura, 1938
- Odostomia honis Saurin, 1959
- Odostomia hyalina A. Adams, 1860
- Odostomia hyalinella Kuroda & Habe, 1952
- Odostomia hypatia Dall & Bartsch, 1912
- Odostomia hyphala Watson, 1886
- Odostomia icafra Bartch, 1915
- Odostomia ignorata (Monterosato, 1917)
- Odostomia iliuliukensis Dall & Bartsch, 1909
- Odostomia improbabilis Oberling, 1970
- Odostomia incidata Suter, 1908
- Odostomia inconspicua (C.B. Adams, 1852)
- Odostomia inestojeirae Peñas, Rolán & Swinnen, 2019
- Odostomia inflata Carpenter, 1864
- Odostomia infrequens (Nomura, 1937)
- Odostomia inornata Suter, 1908 (nomen dubium)
- Odostomia intermedia (Carpenter, 1857)
- † Odostomia iota Maxwell, 1992
- Odostomia irafca Bartsch, 1915
- Odostomia isthmiea Strong & Hertlein, 1939
- Odostomia italoi Penas & Rolan, 1999
- Odostomia jacquesi Penas & Rolan, 1999
- Odostomia jesusabadi Peñas, Rolán & Swinnen, 2019
- Odostomia jonesii Verrill & Bush, 1900

=== K-L ===
- Odostomia kadiakensis Dall & Bartsch, 1909
- Odostomia kelseyi Bartsch, 1912
- Odostomia kennerleyi Dall & Bartsch, 1907
- Odostomia kergueleae van Aartsen & Corgan, 1996
- Odostomia khanhoana Saurin, 1959
- Odostomia killisnooensis Dall & Bartsch, 1909
- Odostomia kotorana Nomura, 1937
- Odostomia krausei Clessin, 1900
- Odostomia kreffti Angas, 1867
- Odostomia kromi van Aartsen, Menkhorst & Gittenberger, 1984
- Odostomia kuiperi (van Aartsen, Gittenberger & Goud, 1998)
- Odostomia laevigata (d'Orbigny, 1841)
- Odostomia laicismorum Peñas, Rolán & Swinnen, 2014
- Odostomia lapazana Dall & Bartsch, 1909
- Odostomia lastra Dall & Bartsch, 1909
- Odostomia lavertinae E. A. Smith, 1901
- Odostomia leopardis Laseron, 1951
- Odostomia lesuroiti Peñas & Rolán, 1999
- Odostomia licina Dall & Bartsch, 1909
- Odostomia limhaughi Hertlein & Allison, 1968
- Odostomia limpida Dall & Bartsch, 1906
- Odostomia litiopina Melvill & Standen, 1901
- Odostomia loomisi Dall & Bartsch, 1909
- Odostomia lorellae Micali, 1987
- Odostomia lorioli (Hornung & Mermod, 1924)
- Odostomia lubrica Verrill & Bush, 1900
- Odostomia lucasana Dall & Bartsch, 1909
- Odostomia lucca Dall & Bartsch, 1909
- Odostomia lukisii Jeffreys, 1859

=== M-N ===
- Odostomia mabutii Nomura, 1938
- Odostomia maccullochi Hedley, 1909
- Odostomia madeirensis Peñas, Rolán & Swinnen, 2014
- Odostomia magnumos Saurin, 1962
- † Odostomia mahoenuica Laws, 1939
- Odostomia major Melvill & Standen, 1901
- Odostomia mammillata Carpenter, 1857
- Odostomia manukauensis Laws, 1939
- Odostomia mara Bartsch, 1926
- Odostomia margarita Pilsbry, 1918
- Odostomia marginata (C.B. Adams, 1852)
- Odostomia mariae Bartsch, 1928
- Odostomia martinensis Strong, 1938
- Odostomia matsusimana Nomura, 1936
- Odostomia mauritiana Dall & Bartsch, 1906
- Odostomia megerlei (Locard, 1886)
- Odostomia meijeri van Aartsen, Gittenberger E. & Goud, 1998
- Odostomia melitta Bartsch, 1924
- Odostomia mendozae Baker, Hanna & Strong, 1928
- Odostomia mera Laseron, 1959
- Odostomia mesomorpha Schander, 1994
- Odostomia metcalfei Pritchard & Gatliff, 1900
- Odostomia microeques Rolán & Templado in Peñas & Rolán, 1999
- Odostomia microlinea Laseron, 1951
- Odostomia micrometrica Penas & Rolan, 1999
- Odostomia minormirabilis Peñas, Rolán & Swinnen, 2014
- Odostomia minutissima Dall & Bartsch, 1909
- Odostomia monodon (Requien, 1848)
- Odostomia moratora Dall & Bartsch, 1909
- Odostomia movilla Dall & Bartsch, 1909
- Odostomia muelleri Clessin, 1900
- Odostomia murdochi Suter, 1913
- Odostomia nana A. Adams, 1860
- Odostomia nardoi Brusina, 1869
- Odostomia natata Penas & Rolan, 1999
- Odostomia natukoae Nomura, 1938
- Odostomia navarettei Baker, Hanna & Strong, 1928
- Odostomia neglecta A. Adams, 1860
- Odostomia nemo Dall & Bartsch, 1909
- Odostomia nicoyana Hertlein & Strong, 1951
- Odostomia nivea A. Adams, 1860
- Odostomia nodosa Carpenter, 1857
- Odostomia nofronii Buzzurro, 2002
- Odostomia nota Dall & Bartsch, 1909
- Odostomia notabilis (C.B. Adams, 1852)
- Odostomia notilla Dall & Bartsch, 1909
- Odostomia nova Castellanos, 1982
- Odostomia nuciformis Carpenter, 1864
- Odostomia nunivakensis Dall & Bartsch, 1909

=== O-P ===
- Odostomia obesula A. Adams, 1860
- Odostomia oblongella Corgan, 1970
- Odostomia oblongula Marshall, 1895
- † Odostomia obstinata Laws, 1939
- Odostomia occultidens May W.L., 1915
- Odostomia odostomella Peñas & Rolán, 1999
- Odostomia oldroydi Dall & Bartsch, 1909
- Odostomia olssoni Bartsch, 1924
- Odostomia omphaloessa Watson, 1897
- Odostomia oonisca Dall & Bartsch, 1909
- Odostomia optata Yokoyama, 1920
- Odostomia orariana Dall & Bartsch, 1909
- Odostomia oregonensis Dall & Bartsch, 1907
- Odostomia ornatissima (Haas, 1943)
- Odostomia oryza Garrett, 1873
- † Odostomia ototarana Laws, 1939
- Odostomia ovata Carpenter, 1857
- Odostomia ovoidea A. Adams, 1860
- Odostomia oxia Watson, 1886
- Odostomia oyasiwo Nomura, 1939
- Odostomia paardekooperi van Aartsen, Gittenberger & Goud, 1998
- Odostomia pacha Bartsch, 1926
- Odostomia pallidior Nomura, 1937
- Odostomia palmeri Bartsch, 1912
- Odostomia palmaensis (Peñas & Rolán, 1999)
- Odostomia palmeri Bartsch, 1912
- Odostomia panamensis Clessin, 1900
- Odostomia parella Dall & Bartsch, 1909
- Odostomia parodontosis Schander, 1994
- Odostomia parvacutangula Laws, 1939
- Odostomia paulhenrii Penas & Rolan, 1999
- Odostomia paupercula (C.B. Adams, 1852)
- Odostomia pedica Laws, 1939
- Odostomia pedroana Dall & Bartsch, 1909
- Odostomia perspicua Thiele, 1930
- Odostomia pervaga Laws, 1939
- Odostomia pesa Dall & Bartsch, 1909
- Odostomia petterdi (Gatliff, 1900)
- Odostomia pfeifferi Preston, 1908
- Odostomia phanella Dall & Bartsch, 1909
- Odostomia pharcida Dall & Bartsch, 1907
- Odostomia photis Carpenter, 1857
- Odostomia pilsbryi Dall & Bartsch, 1904
- † Odostomia pleioregona Bartsch, 1917
- Odostomia plicata (Montagu, 1803)
- Odostomia pocahontasae Henderson & Bartsch, 1914
- Odostomia polita Pease, 1867
- Odostomia poppei Dall & Bartsch, 1909
- Odostomia porteri Baker, Hanna & Strong, 1928
- Odostomia pratoma Dall & Bartsch, 1909
- Odostomia principalis Peñas, Rolán & Swinnen, 2014
- Odostomia prinsi van Aartsen, Gittenberger & Goud, 1998
- Odostomia producta A. Adams, 1860
- Odostomia profundicola Dall & Bartsch, 1909
- Odostomia profundiperforata Nomura, 1937
- Odostomia promeces Dall & Bartsch, 1909
- Odostomia prona (Peñas & Rolán, 1999)
- Odostomia proxima (de Folin, 1872)
- Odostomia pruinosa A. Adams, 1860
- Odostomia pseudoprona Peñas, Rolán & Swinnen, 2019
- Odostomia pudica Suter, 1908
- Odostomia puelchana Castellanos, 1982
- Odostomia pulchra (de Folin, 1872)
- Odostomia pulcia Dall & Bartsch, 1909
- Odostomia pupa A. Adams, 1860
- Odostomia pygmaea A. Adams, 1860
- Odostomia pyxidata Schander, 1994

=== Q-R ===
- Odostomia quadrae Dall & Bartsch, 1910
- Odostomia quilla Bartsch, 1926
- Odostomia raymondi Dall & Bartsch, 1909
- Odostomia recta (de Folin, 1872)
- Odostomia reedi Bartsch, 1928
- Odostomia reigeni Carpenter, 1857
- Odostomia resina Dall & Bartsch, 1909
- Odostomia restii (Peñas & Rolán, 1999)
- Odostomia rhizophorae Hertlein & Strong, 1951
- Odostomia richi Dall & Bartsch, 1909
- Odostomia rinella Dall & Bartsch, 1909
- Odostomia rissoiformis Milaschewitsch, 1909
- Odostomia ritteri Dall & Bartsch, 1909
- Odostomia romburghi van Aartsen, Gittenberger & Goud, 1998
- Odostomia rosacea Pease, 1867
- Odostomia rotundata Carpenter, 1857
- Odostomia rubra Pease, 1867
- Odostomia ryalea Bartsch, 1927

=== S ===
- Odostomia salinasensis Bartsch, 1928
- Odostomia sanctorum Dall & Bartsch, 1909
- Odostomia sanetomoi Nomura, 1938
- Odostomia sanjuanensis Bartsch, 1920
- Odostomia santamariensis Bartsch, 1917
- Odostomia satura Carpenter, 1864
- Odostomia scalariformis Carpenter, 1857
- Odostomia scalarina Gould, 1861
- Odostomia scalina A. Adams, 1860
- Odostomia scammonensis Dall & Bartsch, 1909
- Odostomia schrami van Aartsen, Gittenberger E. & Goud, 1998
- Odostomia septentrionalis Dall & Bartsch, 1909
- Odostomia serilla Dall & Bartsch, 1909
- Odostomia setoutiensis Nomura, 1939
- † Odostomia sherriffi Hutton, 1883
- Odostomia shimosensis Yokoyama, 1922
- Odostomia silesui Nofroni, 1988
- Odostomia sillana Dall & Bartsch, 1909
- Odostomia siogamensis Nomura, 1936
- Odostomia sitiroi Nomura, 1937
- Odostomia sitkaensis Clessin, 1900
- Odostomia skidegatensis Bartsch, 1912
- Odostomia solidula C. B. Adams, 1850
- Odostomia soluta Gould, 1861
- Odostomia sordida (Lea, 1842)
- Odostomia sorenseni Strong, 1949
- Odostomia sorianoi Peñas & Rolán, 2006
- Odostomia sperabilis Hedley, 1909
- Odostomia spreadboroughi Dall & Bartsch, 1910
- Odostomia stearnsiella Pilsbry, 1918
- Odostomia stephensae Dall & Bartsch, 1909
- Odostomia striata (A. E. Verrill, 1880)
- Odostomia stricta Laseron, 1951
- Odostomia striolata Forbes & Hanley, 1850
- Odostomia strongi Bartsch, 1927
- Odostomia subdiaphana A. Adams, 1860
- Odostomia subdotella Hertlein & Strong, 1951
- Odostomia subglobosa Bartsch, 1912
- Odostomia sublimpida Yokoyama, 1920
- Odostomia sublirulata Carpenter, 1857
- Odostomia suboblonga Jeffreys, 1884
- Odostomia suboxia Yokoyama, 1920
- Odostomia suboxioides Nomura, 1936
- Odostomia subscripta Schander, 1994
- Odostomia subturrita Dall & Bartsch, 1909
- Odostomia suezakiensis Nomura, 1936
- Odostomia sulcosa (Mighels, 1843)
- Odostomia suprasulcata Penas & Rolan, 1999
- Odostomia swetti Strong & Hertlein, 1939
- Odostomia syrnoloides Melvill, 1896

=== T ===
- Odostomia tacomaensis Dall & Bartsch, 1907
- Odostomia takapunaensis Suter, 1908
- Odostomia talama Dall & Bartsch, 1909
- Odostomia talpa Dall & Bartsch, 1909
- Odostomia tanegasimana Nomura, 1939
- Odostomia taravali Bartsch, 1917
- Odostomia tasmanica (Tenison Woods, 1877)
- Odostomia taumakiensis Suter, 1908
- Odostomia tehuantepeeana Hertlein & Strong, 1951
- Odostomia telescopium Carpenter, 1857
- Odostomia tenera A. Adams, 1860
- Odostomia tenuis Carpenter, 1857
- Odostomia tenuisculpta Carpenter, 1864
- Odostomia terebellum (C.B. Adams, 1852)
- Odostomia terissa Pilsbry & Lowe, 1932
- Odostomia terrieula Dall & Bartsch in Arnold, 1903
- Odostomia testiculus Peñas & Rolán, 1999
- Odostomia thalia Bartsch, 1912
- Odostomia thea Bartsch, 1912
- Odostomia tomacula (Laseron, 1951)
- Odostomia tomlini W.H. Turton, 1933
- Odostomia torrita Dall & Bartsch, 1909
- Odostomia trachis Dall & Bartsch, 1909
- Odostomia translucens (Strebel, 1908)
- Odostomia tremperi Bartsch, 1927
- Odostomia trimariana Pilsbry & Lowe, 1932
- Odostomia tritestata Nomura, 1937
- Odostomia tropidita Dall & Bartsch, 1909
- Odostomia turgida (G. O. Sars, 1878)
- Odostomia turneri Laws, 1939
- Odostomia turricula Dall & Bartsch, 1903
- Odostomia turriculata Monterosato, 1869
- Odostomia turrita Hanley, 1844
- Odostomia tyleri Dall & Bartsch, 1909

=== U-V ===
- Odostomia ulloana Strong, 1949
- Odostomia umbilicaris (Malm, 1863)
- Odostomia umbilicatissima (Peñas & Rolán, 1999)
- Odostomia unalaskensis Dall & Bartsch, 1909
- Odostomia unidens (Requien, 1848)
- Odostomia unidentata (Montagu, 1803)
- Odostomia unilineata Garrett, 1873
- Odostomia vaga Laws, 1939
- Odostomia valdezi Dall & Bartsch, 1907
- Odostomia valeroi Bartsch, 1917
- Odostomia vancouverensis Dall & Bartsch, 1910
- Odostomia ventricosa A. Adams, 1860
- Odostomia vera Moreno, Peñas & Rolán, 2003
- Odostomia verhoeveni van Aartsen, Gittenberger E. & Goud, 1998
- Odostomia vestalis Murdoch, 1905
- Odostomia victoriae Gatliff & Gabriel, 1911
- Odostomia vira Bartsch, 1926
- Odostomia virginalis Dall & Bartsch, 1909
- Odostomia virginica Henderson & Bartsch, 1914
- Odostomia vitrea A. Adams, 1860
- † Odostomia vixornata (Marwick, 1931)
- Odostomia vizcainoana Baker, Hanna & Strong, 1928

=== W-Z ===
- † Odostomia waihaoensis Maxwell, 1992
- † Odostomia waipaoa Marwick, 1931
- † Odostomia waitakiensis Laws, 1939
- Odostomia wareni (Schander, 1994)
- Odostomia washingtonia Bartsch, 1920
- † Odostomia whangaparaoa Grant-Mackie & Chapman-Smith, 1971
- Odostomia whitei Bartsch, 1927
- Odostomia willetti Bartsch, 1917
- Odostomia winfriedi (Peñas & Rolán, 1999)
- Odostomia winkleyi Bartsch, 1909
- Odostomia woodhridgei Hertlein & Strong, 1951
- Odostomia yokoyamai Nomura, 1936
- Odostomia youngi Dall & Bartsch, 1910
- Odostomia yuigahamana Nomura, 1938
- Odostomia zamia Nomura, 1937
- Odostomia zannii Penas & Rolan, 1999
- † Odostomia zecorpulenta Laws, 1939
- Odostomia zeteki Bartsch, 1918
- Odostomia ziziphina Carpenter, 1857

== Synonyms ==
The following species were brought into synonymy:

- Odostomia aciculina Souverbie, 1865: synonym of Styloptygma aciculina (Souverbie, 1865) (original combination)
- Odostomia acuticostata Jeffreys, 1884: synonym of Turbonilla postacuticostata Sacco, 1892
- Odostomia alba Calkins, 1878: synonym of Melanella conoidea (Kurtz & Stimpson, 1851)
- Odostomia albella (Loven): synonym of Odostomia unidentata (Montagu, 1803)
- Odostomia amiantus Dall & Bartsch, 1907: synonym of Odostomia amianta Dall & Bartsch, 1907
- Odostomia amoena Monterosato, 1878: synonym of Turbonilla amoena (Monterosato, 1878)
- Odostomia angasi Tryon, 1886: synonym of Syrnola angasi (Tryon, 1886)
- Odostomia arctica Dall & Bartsch, 1909: synonym of Aartsenia arctica (Dall & Bartsch, 1909)
- Odostomia attenuata Jeffreys, 1884: synonym of Turbonilla micans (Monterosato, 1875)
- Odostomia audoax [sic]: synonym of Odostomia audax Baker, Hanna & Strong, 1928
- Odostomia babylonia (C. B. Adams, 1845): synonym of Pseudoscilla babylonia (C. B. Adams, 1845)
- Odostomia barashi Bogi & Galil, 2000: synonym of Auristomia barashi (Bogi & Galil, 2000)
- Odostomia boteroi Schander, 1994: synonym of Megastomia boteroi (Schander, 1994)
- Odostomia carrozzai van Aartsen, 1987: synonym of Brachystomia carrozzai (van Aartsen, 1987)
- Odostomia brevicula Jeffreys, 1883: synonym of Turbonilla amoena (Monterosato, 1878)
- Odostomia canaliculata C. B. Adams, 1850: synonym of Eulimastoma canaliculatum (C. B. Adams, 1850)
- Odostomia canaria Hedley, 1907: synonym of Syrnola canaria (Hedley, 1907)
- Odostomia clathrata Jeffreys, 1848: synonym of Chrysallida clathrata (Jeffreys, 1848)
- Odostomia compressa Jeffreys, 1884: synonym of Turbonilla amoena (Monterosato, 1878)
- Odostomia conoidea (Brocchi, 1814): synonym of Megastomia conoidea (Brocchi, 1814)
- Odostomia convexa Carpenter, 1857: synonym of Chrysallida convexa (Carpenter, 1857)
- Odostomia crassicostata W.H. Turton, 1932: synonym of Hinemoa crassella van Aartsen & Corgan, 1996
- Odostomia dekleini (Aartsen, Gittenberger & Goud, 1998): synonym of Odetta dekleini van Aartsen, Gittenberger E. & Goud, 1998
- Odostomia delicata Monterosato, 1874: synonym of Turbonilla acuta (Donovan, 1804)
- Odostomia densestriata Garrett, 1873: synonym of Syrnola densestriata (Garrett, 1873)
- Odostomia desmiti van Aartsen, Gittenberger E. & Goud, 1998: synonym of Megastomia desmiti (van Aartsen, Gittenberger & Goud, 1998)
- Odostomia didyma W.H. Turton, 1932: synonym of Odostomia dyma van Aartsen & Corgan, 1996
- Odostomia dilucida (Monterosato, 1884): synonym of Ondina dilucida (Monterosato, 1884)
- Odostomia dulcis W.H. Turton, 1932: synonym of Odostomia gittenbergeri van Aartsen & Corgan, 1996
- Odostomia dux Dall & Bartsch, 1906: synonym of Chrysallida dux (Dall & Bartsch, 1906)
- Odostomia eclecta Pilsbry, 1918: synonym of Evalea eclecta (Pilsbry, 1918)
- Odostomia elegans A. Adams, 1860: synonym of Evalea elegans (A. Adams, 1860)
- Odostomia elegantissima (Montagu, 1803): synonym of Turbonilla lactea (Linnaeus, 1758)
- Odostomia engonia Bush, 1885: synonym of Eulimastoma engonium (Bush, 1885)
- Odostomia erecta W.H. Turton, 1932: synonym of Odostomia barnardi van Aartsen & Corgan, 1996
- Odostomia erjaveciana Brusina, 1869: synonym of Auristomia erjaveciana (Brusina, 1869)
- Odostomia eucosmia Dall & Bartsch, 1909: synonym of Iolaea eucosmia Dall & Bartsch, 1909
- Odostomia eulimoides Hanley, 1844: synonym of Brachystomia eulimoides (Hanley, 1844)
- Odostomia eutropia Melvill, 1899: synonym of Eulimastoma eutropia (Melvill, 1899)
- Odostomia excolpa Bartsch, 1912: synonym of Besla excolpa (Bartsch, 1912)
- Odostomia formosa Jeffreys, 1848: synonym of Turbonilla rufa (Philippi, 1836)
- Odostomia formosa W.H. Turton, 1932: synonym of Chrysallida africana van Aartsen & Corgan, 1996
- Odostomia fulgidula Jeffreys, 1884: synonym of Turbonilla fulgidula (Jeffreys, 1884)
- Odostomia fusulus Monterosato, 1878: synonym of Auristomia fusulus (Monterosato, 1878)
- Odostomia gemma (A. Adams, 1861): synonym of Miralda gemma (A. Adams, 1861)
- Odostomia gigantea Dunker, 1877: synonym of Leucotina casta (A. Adams, 1853)
- Odostomia gisna Dall & Bartsch, 1904: synonym of Helodiamea gisna (Dall & Bartsch, 1904)
- Odostomia glabrata sensu Forbes & Hanley, 1850: synonym of Odostomia megerlei (Locard, 1886)
- Odostomia gracilis Pease, 1868: synonym of Evalea waikikiensis (Pilsbry, 1918)
- Odostomia haleiwensis Pilsbry, 1918: synonym of Evalea waikikiensis (Pilsbry, 1918)
- Odostomia hiloensis Pilsbry, 1944: synonym of Evalea waikikiensis (Pilsbry, 1918)
- Odostomia hiloensis Pilsbry, 1918: synonym of Odostomia stearnsiella Pilsbry, 1918
- Odostomia hypocurta Dall & Bartsch, 1909: synonym of Menestho hypocurta (Dall & Bartsch, 1909)
- Odostomia insculpta (Montagu, 1808): synonym of Ondina divisa (J. Adams, 1797)
- Odostomia intermedia Brusina, 1869: synonym of Chrysallida ghisottii (van Aartsen, 1984)
- Odostomia io W.H. Turton, 1932: synonym of Evalea carinae van Aartsen & Corgan, 1996
- Odostomia jadisi Olsson & McGinty, 1958: synonym of Boonea jadisi (Olsson & McGinty, 1958)
- Odostomia kahoolawensis Pilsbry, 1918: synonym of Odostomia stearnsiella Pilsbry, 1918
- Odostomia lactea Angas, 1867: synonym of Syrnola angasi (Tryon, 1886)
- Odostomia lacunata Carpenter, 1857: synonym of Egila lacunata (Carpenter, 1857)
- Odostomia letsonae Pilsbry, 1918: synonym of Chrystella letsonae (Pilsbry, 1918)
- Odostomia lutea Garrett, 1873: synonym of Styloptygma luteum (Garrett, 1873)
- Odostomia magnifica Seguenza G., 1879: synonym of Turbonilla magnifica (Seguenza G., 1879)
- Odostomia marci (van Aartsen, Gittenberger & Goud, 1998): synonym of Odetta marci van Aartsen, Gittenberger & Goud, 1998
- Odostomia martensi Dall & Bartsch, 1906: synonym of Aartsenia martensi (Dall & Bartsch, 1906)
- Odostomia metata Hedley, 1907: synonym of Odostomella metata (Hedley, 1907)
- Odostomia micans Monterosato, 1875: synonym of Turbonilla micans (Monterosato, 1875)
- Odostomia minima Jeffreys, 1858: synonym of Cima minima (Jeffreys, 1858)
- Odostomia modesta (Stimpson, 1851): synonym of Fargoa bartschi (Winkley, 1909)
- Odostomia monaulax Pilsbry, 1918: synonym of Odostomia stearnsiella Pilsbry, 1918
- Odostomia moulinsiana P. Fischer, 1864: synonym of Chrysallida terebellum (Philippi, 1844)
- Odostomia nanodea Monterosato, 1878: synonym of Chrysallida juliae (de Folin, 1872)
- Odostomia navisa Dall & Bartsch, 1907: synonym of Folinella navisa (Dall & Bartsch, 1907)
- Odostomia nisoides Brugnone, 1873: synonym of Eulimella scillae (Scacchi, 1835)
- Odostomia nitens Jeffreys, 1870: synonym of Doliella nitens (Jeffreys, 1870)
- Odostomia nitida Alder, 1844: synonym of Odostomia scalaris MacGillivray, 1843
- Odostomia nivosa (Montagu, 1803): synonym of Chrysallida nivosa (Montagu, 1803)
- Odostomia normani Friele, 1886: synonym of Ondina normani (Friele, 1886)
- Odostomia obeliscus W.H. Turton, 1932: synonym of Odostomia becki W.H. Turton, 1933
- Odostomia obeliscus Garrett, 1873: synonym of Syrnola obeliscus (Garrett, 1873)
- Odostomia obliqua Alder, 1844: synonym of Ondina obliqua (Alder, 1844)
- Odostomia obtusa W.H. Turton, 1932: synonym of Odostomia tomlini W.H. Turton, 1933
- Odostomia omaensis Nomura, 1938: synonym of Brachystomia omaensis (Nomura, 1938)
- Odostomia ooniscia Dall & Bartsch, 1909: synonym of Odostomia oonisca Dall & Bartsch, 1909
- Odostomia ornata W.H. Turton, 1932: synonym of Chrysallida vanbruggeni van Aartsen & Corgan, 1996
- Odostomia pagodiformis Schander, 1994: synonym of Megastomia pagodiformis (Schander, 1994)
- Odostomia pallida (Montagu, 1803): synonym of Brachystomia eulimoides (Hanley, 1844)
- Odostomia patricia Pilsbry, 1918: synonym of Herviera patricia (Pilsbry, 1918)
- Odostomia paucistriata Jeffreys, 1884: synonym of Turbonilla paucistriata (Jeffreys, 1884)
- Odostomia peregrina Thiele, 1912: synonym of Odostomia kergueleae van Aartsen & Corgan, 1996
- Odostomia praelonga Jeffreys, 1884: synonym of Eulimella cerullii (Cossmann, 1916)
- Odostomia pretiosa W.H. Turton, 1932: synonym of Pyrgulina sowerbyi van Aartsen & Corgan, 1996
- Odostomia prima Pilsbry, 1918: synonym of Nesiodostomia tertia (Pilsbry, 1918)
- Odostomia producta (C. B. Adams, 1840): synonym of Syrnola producta (C. B. Adams, 1840)
- Odostomia pulcherrima Dall & Bartsch, 1909: synonym of Boonea cincta (Carpenter, 1864)
- Odostomia pulchra Garrett, 1873: synonym of Linopyrga pulchra (Garrett, 1873)
- Odostomia pulcia Dall & Bartsch, 1909: synonym of Boonea cincta (Carpenter, 1864)
- Odostomia pupaeformis Souverbie, 1865: synonym of Pyrgulina pupaeformis (Souverbie, 1865)
- Odostomia pupu Pilsbry, 1918: synonym of Hinemoa indica (Melvill, 1896)
- Odostomia quarta Pilsbry, 1918: synonym of Nesiodostomia quarta (Pilsbry, 1918)
- Odostomia quinquecincta (Carpenter, 1856): synonym of Folinella quinquecincta (Carpenter, 1856)
- Odostomia quinta Pilsbry, 1918: synonym of Nesiodostomia tertia (Pilsbry, 1918)
- Odostomia rissoides Hanley, 1844: synonym of Odostomia scalaris MacGillivray, 1843
- Odostomia rissoiformis Milachevitch, 1912: synonym of Odostomia albella (Loven)
- Odostomia robusta G.B. Sowerby III, 1901: synonym of Pyrgulina durabilis van Aartsen & Corgan, 1996
- Odostomia rosea Monterosato, 1877: synonym of Turbonilla internodula (S.V. Wood, 1848)
- Odostomia rufula Souverbie, 1875: synonym of Odostomia lutea Garrett, 1873
- Odostomia rugata Hutton, 1886: synonym of Linopyrga rugata (Hutton, 1886)
- Odostomia rutor Nofroni & Schander, 1994: synonym of Auristomia rutor (Nofroni & Schander, 1994)
- Odostomia sapia Dall & Bartsch, 1909: synonym of Boonea cincta (Carpenter, 1864)
- Odostomia scalaris (Philippi, 1836): synonym of Pyrgiscus jeffreysii (Jeffreys, 1848)
- Odostomia scillae (Scacchi, 1835): synonym of Eulimella scillae (Scacchi, 1835)
- Odostomia scopulorum Watson, 1886: synonym of Miralda scopulorum (Watson, 1886)
- Odostomia secunda Pilsbry, 1918: synonym of Nesiodostomia montforti Corgan, 1972
- Odostomia sicula Philippi, 1851: synonym of Megastomia conoidea (Brocchi, 1814)
- Odostomia sigmoidea Monterosato, 1880: synonym of Chrysallida sigmoidea (Monterosato, 1880)
- Odostomia sinuosa Jeffreys, 1884: synonym of Turbonilla sinuosa (Jeffreys, 1884)
- Odostomia sinuosa Nomura, 1937: synonym of Sinuatodostomia nomurai van Aartsen & Corgan, 1996
- Odostomia socorroensis Dall & Bartsch, 1909: synonym of Odostomia tenuisculpta Carpenter, 1864
- Odostomia somersi Verrill & Bush, 1900: synonym of Boonea somersi (Verrill & Bush, 1900)
- Odostomia sulcata Hutton, 1885: synonym of Leucotina casta (A. Adams, 1853)
- Odostomia sulcata Garrett, 1873: synonym of Turbonilla garrettiana Dall & Bartsch, 1906
- Odostomia sulcifera E.A. Smith, 1871: synonym of Megastomia sulcifera (E.A. Smith, 1871)
- Odostomia suta Pilsbry, 1918: synonym of Teretianax suta (Pilsbry, 1918)
- Odostomia teres Bush, 1885: synonym of Eulimastoma engonium (Bush, 1885)
- Odostomia terryi Olsson & McGinty, 1958: synonym of Ivara terryi (Olsson & McGinty, 1958)
- Odostomia testicula (Peñas & Rolán, 1999): synonym of Odostomia testiculus Peñas & Rolán, 1999
- Odostomia tornata A. E. Verrill, 1884: synonym of Oscilla tornata (A. E. Verrill, 1884)
- Odostomia toroensis (Olsson & McGinty, 1958): synonym of Mumiola gradatula (Mörch, 1876)
- Odostomia trifida (Totten, 1834): synonym of Boonea bisuturalis (Say, 1822)
- Odostomia truncatula Jeffreys, 1850: synonym of Jordaniella truncatula (Jeffreys, 1850)
- Odostomia turbonilloides Brusina, 1869: synonym of Chrysallida incerta (Milaschewitsch, 1916)
- Odostomia unifasciata (Forbes, 1844): synonym of Eulimella unifasciata (Forbes, 1844)
- Odostomia vanurki van Aartsen, Gittenberger E. & Goud, 1998: synonym of Odostomia wareni (Schander, 1994)
- Odostomia venusta Monterosato, 1875: synonym of Turbonilla amoena (Monterosato, 1878)
- Odostomia verduini van Aartsen, 1987: synonym of Odostomia improbabilis Oberling, 1970
- Odostomia vicola Dall & Bartsch, 1909: synonym of Boonea cincta (Carpenter, 1864)
- Odostomia vincta Dall & Bartsch, 1909: synonym of Boonea cincta (Carpenter, 1864)
- Odostomia weberi Morrison, 1965: synonym of Eulimastoma weberi (Morrison, 1965)
- Odostomia zijpi van Aartsen, Gittenberger E. & Goud, 1998: synonym of Megastomia zijpi (van Aartsen, Gittenberger & Goud, 1998)
