= Odostomia brandhorsti =

Scientific classification
- Kingdom: Animalia
- Phylum: Mollusca
- Class: Gastropoda
- Family: Pyramidellidae
- Genus: Odostomia
- Species: O. brandhorsti

Binomial name
- Odostomia brandhorsti van Aartsen, Gittenberger & Goud, 1998

Synonyms
- Odostomia (Odostomia) brandhorsti van Aartsen, Gittenberger & Goud, 1998

Species of gastropod

Odostomia brandhorsti is a species of sea snail, a marine gastropod mollusk in the family Pyramidellidae, the pyrams and their allies.

== Description ==
The size of the shell of this micromollusc varies between 1.4 mm and 1.9 mm.

== Distribution ==
This species occurs in the following locations:

- Cape Verde
- São Tomé and Príncipe
