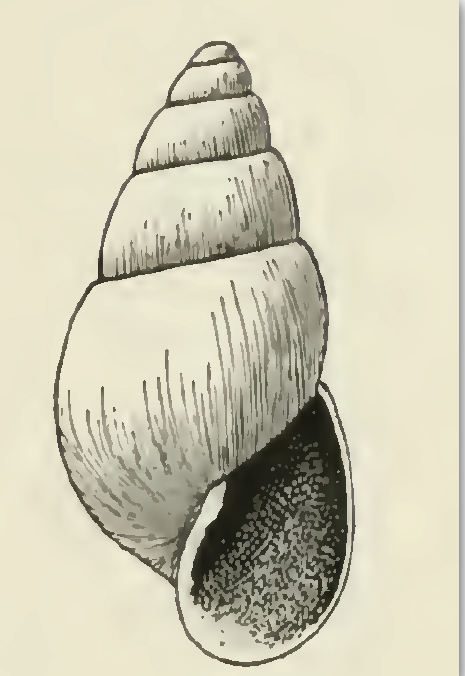
- Apertural view of Odostomia quadrae

Scientific classification
- Kingdom: Animalia
- Phylum: Mollusca
- Class: Gastropoda
- Family: Pyramidellidae
- Genus: Odostomia
- Species: O. quadrae

Binomial name
- Odostomia quadrae Dall & Bartsch, 1910

Synonyms
- Evalea quadrae (Dall & Bartsch, 1910); Odostomia (Evalea) quadrae Dall & Bartsch, 1910

= Odostomia quadrae =

Species of gastropod

Odostomia quadrae is a species of sea snail. It is a marine gastropod mollusc in the family Pyramidellidae.

== Description ==
The milk-white shell is elongate-ovate, umbilicated, and measures 6.2 mm. The nuclear whorls are deeply, obliquely immersed in the first of the post-nuclear turns, above which only the tilted edge of the last whorl projects. The six post-nuclear whorls are moderately rounded. They are marked by faint lines of growth, and numerous microscopic spiral striations. In addition, the body whorl shows many shallow dents. The periphery of the body whorl and the moderately long base are somewhat inflated and well rounded. They are also marked like the spire. The large aperture is oval, while the posterior angle is acute. The outer lip is thin, while the inner lip is very oblique, slightly curved, and strongly revolute, extending partly over the umbilicus. It has a moderate fold anterior to its insertion. The parietal wall is glazed with a thin callus.

== Distribution ==
This species lives in the Pacific Ocean off Vancouver Island, British Columbia.
