= Odostomia paardekooperi =

Scientific classification
- Kingdom: Animalia
- Phylum: Mollusca
- Class: Gastropoda
- Family: Pyramidellidae
- Genus: Odostomia
- Species: O. paardekooperi

Binomial name
- Odostomia paardekooperi van Aartsen, Gittenberger & Goud, 1998

Species of gastropod

Odostomia paardekooperi is a species of sea snail, a marine gastropod mollusk in the family Pyramidellidae, the pyrams and their allies.

== Distribution ==
This species occurs in the following locations:

- Cape Verde
