= Odostomia prona =

Scientific classification
- Kingdom: Animalia
- Phylum: Mollusca
- Class: Gastropoda
- Family: Pyramidellidae
- Genus: Odostomia
- Species: O. prona

Binomial name
- Odostomia prona (Peñas & Rolán, 1999)

Species of gastropod

Odostomia prona is a species of sea snail, a marine gastropod mollusc in the family Pyramidellidae, the pyrams and their allies.

== Distribution ==
This species occurs in European waters (ERMS scope).

== Notes ==
Additional information regarding this species:

- Habitat: Known from seamounts and knolls
