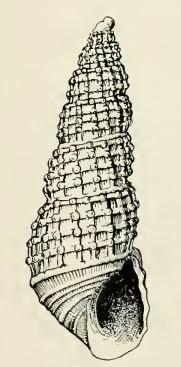
- Apertural view of the shell of Odostomia ritteri

Scientific classification
- Kingdom: Animalia
- Phylum: Mollusca
- Class: Gastropoda
- Family: Pyramidellidae
- Genus: Odostomia
- Species: O. ritteri

Binomial name
- Odostomia ritteri Dall & Bartsch, 1909

Synonyms
- Chrysallida ritteri (Dall & Bartsch, 1909); Odostomia (Chrysallida) ritteri Dall & Bartsch, 1909 (basionym)

= Odostomia ritteri =

Species of gastropod

Odostomia ritteri is a species of sea snail, a marine gastropod mollusc in the family Pyramidellidae, the pyrams and their allies.

== Description ==
The milk-white shell has an elongate-conic shape. Its length measures 4.5 mm. There are at least two whorls in the protoconch. These are smooth, deeply obliquely immersed in the first of the succeeding turns, above which only a portion of the last two turns project. The seven whorls of the teleoconch are moderately rounded, strongly constricted at the sutures, and slopingly shouldered at the summit. They are ornamented by strong, retractive axial ribs of which 14 occur upon the first, 16 upon the second to fourth, 18 upon the fifth, and 20 upon the penultimate turn. In addition to the axial ribs, the whorls are marked by spiral cords between the sutures, which are a little more than half as strong as the ribs and of which three occur upon the first three whorls and four upon the succeeding turns. The second one below the summit marks the angle of the long sloping shoulder. The junction of the ribs and the cords are strongly nodulous. The spaces inclosed between them are deep squarish pits. The sutures are strongly channeled. The periphery of the body whorl is marked by a broad groove that is crossed by the continuations of the axial ribs which terminate at the posterior margin of the first basal keel. The base of the body whorl is well rounded. It is marked by six spiral cords which are of unequal strength, separated by grooves of different widths, which are crossed by fine axial threads. The aperture is oval, and effuse anteriorly; The posterior angle is obtuse. The thin outer lip is rendered sinuous by the cords. It shows the external sculpture within. The columella is slender, strongly reflected, and provided with a fold at its insertion.

== Distribution ==
The type specimen was found in the Pacific Ocean off Catalina Island, California.
