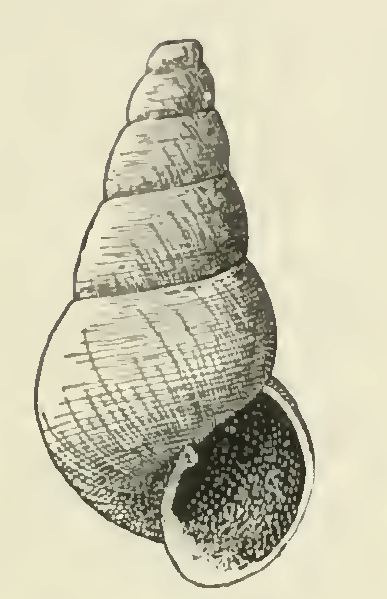
- Apertural view of Odostomia calcarella

Scientific classification
- Kingdom: Animalia
- Phylum: Mollusca
- Class: Gastropoda
- Family: Pyramidellidae
- Genus: Odostomia
- Species: O. calcarella

Binomial name
- Odostomia calcarella Bartsch, 1912

Synonyms
- Evalea calcarella Bartsch, 1912; Odostomia (Evalea) calcarella Bartsch, 1912

= Odostomia calcarella =

Species of gastropod

Odostomia calcarella is a species of sea snail, a marine gastropod mollusc in the family Pyramidellidae, the pyrams and their allies.

== Description ==
The creamy-white shell is very broadly elongate-conic. It measures 3.3 mm. The nuclear whorls are obliquely immersed in the first of the succeeding turns. The five post-nuclear whorls are moderately well rounded, slightly shouldered at the summit. They are marked by decidedly retractive lines of growth and numerous, strong, incised, spiral lines. The sutures are constricted. The periphery of the body whorl is subangulated and inflated. The base of the shell is short and narrowly umbilicated. It is marked like the spire. The large aperture is somewhat effuse anteriorly. The outer lip is thin and strongly curved. The inner lip is slender, decidedly curved and reflected, and provided with a moderately strong fold a little anterior to its insertion.

== Distribution ==
This species occurs in the Pacific Ocean off Santa Rosa Island, California.
