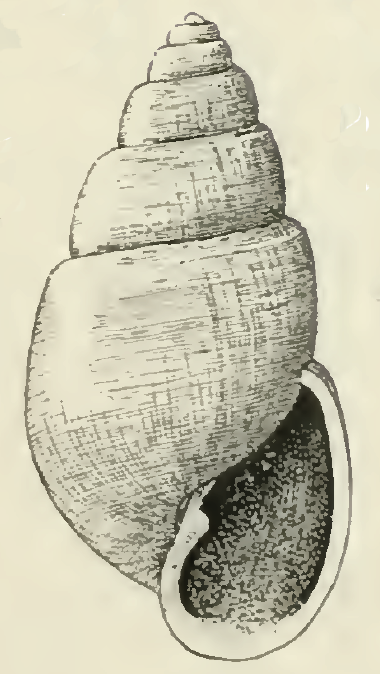
- Apertural view of Odostomia grippiana

Scientific classification
- Kingdom: Animalia
- Phylum: Mollusca
- Class: Gastropoda
- Family: Pyramidellidae
- Genus: Odostomia
- Species: O. grippiana

Binomial name
- Odostomia grippiana Bartsch, 1912

= Odostomia grippiana =

Species of gastropod

Odostomia grippiana is a species of sea snail, a marine gastropod mollusc in the family Pyramidellidae, the pyrams and their allies.

== Description ==
The large shell large measures 7.5 mm. It is umbilicated, yellowish-white. The nuclear whorls are decollated. The six post-nuclear whorls are decidedly, slopingly, tabulatedly shouldered at the summit, otherwise moderately rounded. They are marked by fine incremental lines and numerous, equal and equally spaced, slender, wavy, spiral threads, of which 6 occur upon the shoulder, and about 40 between the shoulder and the suture. The periphery and the moderately long base of the body whorl is well rounded, marked like the spire. The ear-shaped aperture is moderately large. The posterior angle is obtuse. The inner lip is moderately long, stout, curved, somewhat reflected, provided with a strong fold a little anterior to its insertion. The parietal wall is glazed with a thin callus.

== Distribution ==
This species occurs in the Pacific Ocean off British Columbia.
