= Odostomia meijeri =

Scientific classification
- Kingdom: Animalia
- Phylum: Mollusca
- Class: Gastropoda
- Family: Pyramidellidae
- Genus: Odostomia
- Species: O. meijeri

Binomial name
- Odostomia meijeri van Aartsen, Gittenberger E. & Goud, 1998

Synonyms
- Odostomia (Odostomia) meijeri van Aartsen, Gittenberger E. & Goud, 1998

Species of gastropod

Odostomia meijeri is a species of sea snail, a marine gastropod mollusc in the family Pyramidellidae, the pyrams and their allies.

== Description ==
The size of the shell varies between 1.5 -1.8 mm in height, 0.8-1.0 mm in width and 1.6 x 0.9 mm holotype. Because of the spirally incised lines around the periphery, this small species is similar to O. nivosa. Non-paratypes are larger, up to two mm high at the same width, and more slender.

== Distribution ==
This species occurs in the Atlantic Ocean off Mauritania. Its depth range is 0-34 meters.
