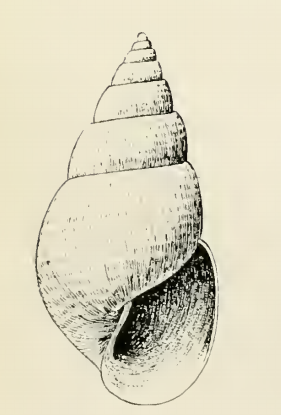
- Apertural view of a shell of Odostomia lastra

Scientific classification
- Kingdom: Animalia
- Phylum: Mollusca
- Class: Gastropoda
- Family: Pyramidellidae
- Genus: Odostomia
- Species: O. lastra

Binomial name
- Odostomia lastra Dall & Bartsch, 1909

Synonyms
- Aartsenia lastra (Dall & Bartsch, 1909); Odostomia (Amaura) lastra Dall & Bartsch, 1909 (basionym)

= Odostomia lastra =

Species of gastropod

Odostomia lastra is a species of sea snail, a marine gastropod mollusc in the family Pyramidellidae, the pyrams and their allies.

== Description ==
The thin, large shell has an elongate-ovate shape, tapering very regularly to an acute point. Its length measures 13.6 mm. The shell is narrowly umbilicated. The whorls of the protoconch are very small, deeply obliquely immersed in the first of the succeeding whorls, above which only the tilted edge of the last volution projects. The eight whorls of the teleoconch are well rounded, moderately constricted at the sutures and narrowly shouldered at the summit. They are marked by numerous slender wavy spiral striations and fine lines of growth which give the surface a somewhat malleated appearance. The periphery and the base of the body whorl are strongly rounded, the latter narrowly umbilicated, and marked like the spire. The aperture is large, broadly oval, slightly effuse anteriorly. The posterior angle is acute. The outer lip is thin. The columella is slender, very oblique, almost straight and somewhat reflected. The parietal wall is glazed with a thin callus.

== Distribution ==
This species occurs in the Pacific Ocean off Santa Catalina Island and San Diego, California.
