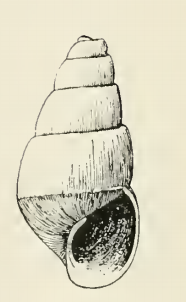
- Apertural view of the shell of Odostomia notilla

Scientific classification
- Kingdom: Animalia
- Phylum: Mollusca
- Class: Gastropoda
- Family: Pyramidellidae
- Genus: Odostomia
- Species: O. notilla

Binomial name
- Odostomia notilla Dall & Bartsch, 1909

Synonyms
- Evalea notilla Dall & Bartsch, 1909; Odostomia (Evalea) notilla Dall & Bartsch, 1909

= Odostomia notilla =

Species of gastropod

Odostomia nota is a species of sea snail, a marine gastropod mollusc in the family Pyramidellidae, the pyrams and their allies.

== Description ==
The yellowish-white shell is very elongate and ovate. Its length measures 2.7 mm. The whorls of the protoconch are deeply obliquely immersed in the first of the succeeding turns, above which only the tilted edge of the last volution projects. The five whorls of the teleoconch are well rounded, feebly contracted at the sutures, narrowly subtabulately shouldered at the summit. The sutures are strongly marked. The periphery of the body whorl is marked by a low raised cord, which renders it decidedly angulated. The base of the shell is short, well rounded, somewhat pinched in at the umbilical area. The entire surface of the spire and the base is marked by almost vertical lines of growth and numerous very fine, well incised, spiral striations. The aperture is ovate. The posterior angle is acute. The outer lip is thin. The columella is slender, slightly curved and provided with a fold at its insertion. The parietal wall is covered with a thick callus.

== Distribution ==
The type specimen was found in the Pacific Ocean off Catalina Island, California.
