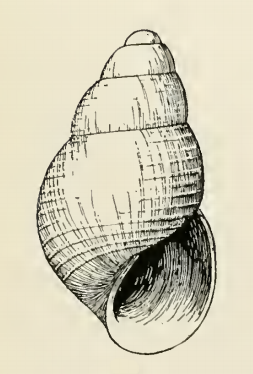
- Apertural view of a shell of Odostomia capitana

Scientific classification
- Kingdom: Animalia
- Phylum: Mollusca
- Class: Gastropoda
- Family: Pyramidellidae
- Genus: Odostomia
- Species: O. capitana

Binomial name
- Odostomia capitana Dall & Bartsch, 1909

Synonyms
- Evalea capitana Dall & Bartsch,1909

= Odostomia capitana =

Species of gastropod

Odostomia capitana is a species of sea snail, a marine gastropod mollusc in the family Pyramidellidae, the pyrams and their allies.

== Description ==
The elongated oval, light yellow, shell is umbilicated. Its length measures 4.6 mm. The whorls of the protoconch are small, deeply, very obliquely immersed in the first of the succeeding turns. The five whorls of the teleoconch are well rounded, with strongly rounded summits. The entire surface is marked by fine lines of growth and exceedingly numerous, very fine, wavy, spiral striations. In addition to these markings the whorls are covered by eight very slender, subequally spaced, obsolete threads between the sutures and four which are. considerably stronger and equally spaced on the base. The periphery and base of the body whorl are well rounded, the latter narrowly umbilicated. The aperture is rather large, broadly ovate. The posterior angle is acute. The outer lip is thin. The columella is slender, very strongly curved and reflected, not reinforced by the base. The parietal wall is covered by a thin callus.

== Distribution ==
This species occurs in the Pacific Ocean off Alaska.
