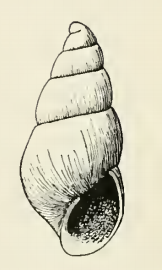
- Apertural view of a shell of Odostomia resina

Scientific classification
- Kingdom: Animalia
- Phylum: Mollusca
- Class: Gastropoda
- Family: Pyramidellidae
- Genus: Odostomia
- Species: O. resina

Binomial name
- Odostomia resina Dall & Bartsch, 1909

Synonyms
- Evalea resina Dall & Bartsch, 1909; Odostomia (Evalea) resina Dall & Bartsch, 1909 (basionym)

= Odostomia resina =

Species of gastropod

Odostomia resina is a species of sea snail, a marine gastropod mollusc in the family Pyramidellidae, the pyrams and their allies.

== Description ==
The very small shell is vitreous, transparent. Its length measures 2.2 mm. The whorls of the protoconch are deeply obliquely immersed in the first of the succeeding turns, above which only the tilted edge of the last volution projects. The five whorls of the teleoconch are inflated, strongly rounded, decidedly contracted at the suture, and appressed at the summit, where the preceding whorl is reflected through it, and gives the summit the false appearance of having a spiral cord. The sutures are strongly constricted. The periphery and the base of the body whorl are well rounded. The entire surface of the shell is marked by lines of growth which are of varying strength, and numerous closely spaced, exceedingly fine, spiral striations. The aperture is ovate. The posterior angle is acute. The outer lip is thin, showing the external sculpture within. The columella is slender, strongly curved, slightly revolute, reinforced by the base, and provided with a fold at its insertion.

== Distribution ==
This species occurs in the Pacific Ocean off California.
