= Hinemoa crassella =

Scientific classification
- Kingdom: Animalia
- Phylum: Mollusca
- Class: Gastropoda
- Family: Pyramidellidae
- Genus: Hinemoa
- Species: H. crassella

Binomial name
- Hinemoa crassella van Aartsen & Corgan, 1996

Synonyms
- Odostomia crassicostata W.H. Turton, 1932

Species of gastropod

Hinemoa crassella is a species of sea snail, a marine gastropod mollusk in the family Pyramidellidae, the pyrams and their allies.
