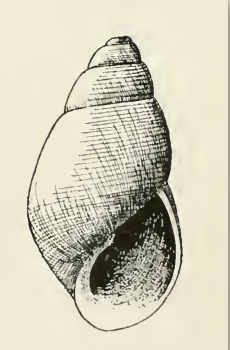
- Apertural view of a shell of Odostomia phanella

Scientific classification
- Kingdom: Animalia
- Phylum: Mollusca
- Class: Gastropoda
- Family: Pyramidellidae
- Genus: Odostomia
- Species: O. phanella

Binomial name
- Odostomia phanella Dall & Bartsch, 1909

Synonyms
- Evalea phanella (Dall & Bartsch, 1909); Odostomia (Evalea) phanella Dall & Bartsch, 1909 (basionym)

= Odostomia phanella =

Species of gastropod

Odostomia phanella is a species of sea snail, a marine gastropod mollusc in the family Pyramidellidae, the pyrams and their allies.

== Description ==
The ovate shell is vitreous, and translucent. Its length measures 3.3 mm. The whorls of the protoconch are deeply, very obliquely immersed in the first of the succeeding turns, above which only the tilted edge of the last volution projects. The four whorls of the teleoconch are inflated, slightly contracted at the suture, and appressed at the summit. They are marked by 8 strongly incised spiral lines on the first and second and 20 upon the third, between the sutures. The sutures are well-marked. The periphery and the base of the body whorl are well-rounded. They are marked by numerous spiral striations, which are a little weaker than those between the periphery and summit of the body whorl. The aperture is oval. The posterior angle is obtuse. The outer lip is thin. The columella is moderately strong, decidedly curved, and strongly revolute. It is provided with a strong fold at its insertion.

== Distribution ==
This species occurs in the Pacific Ocean off California.
