= Odostomia francoi =

Scientific classification
- Kingdom: Animalia
- Phylum: Mollusca
- Class: Gastropoda
- Family: Pyramidellidae
- Genus: Odostomia
- Species: O. francoi

Binomial name
- Odostomia francoi Penas & Rolan, 1999

Species of gastropod

Odostomia francoi is a sea snail species, a marine gastropod mollusc in the Pyramidellidae family, the pyrams and their allies.
