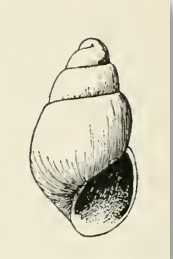
- Apertural view of a shell of Odostomia coronadoensis

Scientific classification
- Kingdom: Animalia
- Phylum: Mollusca
- Class: Gastropoda
- Family: Pyramidellidae
- Genus: Odostomia
- Species: O. coronadoensis

Binomial name
- Odostomia coronadoensis Dall & Bartsch, 1909

= Odostomia coronadoensis =

Species of gastropod

Odostomia coronadoensis is a species of sea snail, a marine gastropod mollusk in the family Pyramidellidae, the pyrams and their allies.

== Description ==
The minute, ovate shell is vitreous. Its length measures 1.7 mm. The whorls of the protoconch are almost vertically deeply immersed in the first of the succeeding turns, above which the tilted edge of the last volution projects. The four whorls of the teleoconch are well rounded, slightly contracted at the sutures, and with a well rounded shoulder at the summit. They are marked by retractive lines of growth only. The sutures are well impressed. The periphery and the base of the body whorl are slightly inflated, well rounded. They are marked like the spire. The aperture is ovate. The posterior angle is acute. The outer lip is thin. The columella is slender, strongly curved, slightly revolute, reinforced by the base. It is provided with a weak, deep-seated fold. The parietal wall is covered with a thin callus.

== Distribution ==
The species is found in the Pacific Ocean off San Diego, California.
