= Odostomia sanjuanensis =

Scientific classification
- Kingdom: Animalia
- Phylum: Mollusca
- Class: Gastropoda
- Family: Pyramidellidae
- Genus: Odostomia
- Species: O. sanjuanensis

Binomial name
- Odostomia sanjuanensis Bartsch, 1920

Synonyms
- Aartsenia sanjuanensis (Bartsch, 1920); Odostomia (Amaura) sanjuanensis Bartsch, 1920

Species of gastropod

Odostomia sanjuanensis is a species of sea snail, a marine gastropod mollusc in the family Pyramidellidae, the pyrams and their allies.
