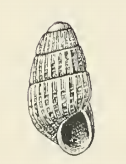
- Apertural view of the shell of Odostomia callimorpha

Scientific classification
- Kingdom: Animalia
- Phylum: Mollusca
- Class: Gastropoda
- Family: Pyramidellidae
- Genus: Odostomia
- Species: O. callimorpha

Binomial name
- Odostomia callimorpha Dall & Bartsch, 1909

Synonyms
- Chrysallida pumila Carpenter, 1866 not Odostomia pumila A. Adams, 1861; Odostomia (Besla) callimorpha Dall & Bartsch, 1909 (basionym)

= Odostomia callimorpha =

Species of gastropod

Odostomia callimorpha is a species of sea snail, a marine gastropod mollusc in the family Pyramidellidae, the pyrams and their allies.

== Description ==
The very small, pupiform shell is milk-white. It measures 1.5 mm. The whorls of the protoconch are completely immersed. The five whorls of the teleoconch are flattened, slightly contracted at the sutures, moderately shouldered at the summit. They are marked by strong, depressed, rounded, almost vertical axial ribs, of which 22 occur upon all but the first whorl, which is smooth. The intercostal spaces are about as wide as the ribs, crossed by three slender, spiral lirations on the anterior half of the whorls between the sutures. The sutures are subchanneled. The periphery and the base of the body whorl are well rounded, and marked by the continuations of the axial ribs, which extend almost undiminished to the umbilical area and five equal slender, spiral lirations on the posterior half of the base. The aperture is broadly oval. The posterior angle is acute. The outer lip is thin, showing the external sculpture within. The columella is strongly curved, slightly revolute, reinforced on its posterior half by the base, provided with a strong fold at its insertion.

== Distribution ==
This species occurs in the Pacific Ocean off California.
