= Odostomia winkleyi =

Scientific classification
- Kingdom: Animalia
- Phylum: Mollusca
- Class: Gastropoda
- Family: Pyramidellidae
- Genus: Odostomia
- Species: O. winkleyi

Binomial name
- Odostomia winkleyi Bartsch, 1909

Species of gastropod

Odostomia winkleyi is a species of sea snail, a marine gastropod mollusc in the family Pyramidellidae, the pyrams and their allies.

== Distribution ==
This species occurs in the following locations:

- North West Atlantic

== Notes ==
Additional information regarding this species:

- Distribution: Range: 41.3°N; 72.8°W to 71°W. Distribution: USA: Massachusetts to Connecticut
