= Odostomia glaphyra =

Scientific classification
- Kingdom: Animalia
- Phylum: Mollusca
- Class: Gastropoda
- Family: Pyramidellidae
- Genus: Odostomia
- Species: O. glaphyra

Binomial name
- Odostomia glaphyra E. A. Smith, 1890

Species of gastropod

Odostomia glaphyra is a species of sea snail, a marine gastropod mollusc in the family Pyramidellidae, the pyrams and their allies.

== Description ==
The shell grows to a length of 2.5 mm. The species is represented by multiple syntype shells, which were illustrated in a 2023 taxonomic study of the Pyramidellidae of Saint Helena and Ascension Island.

== Distribution ==
This species occurs in the Atlantic Ocean off St Helena.
