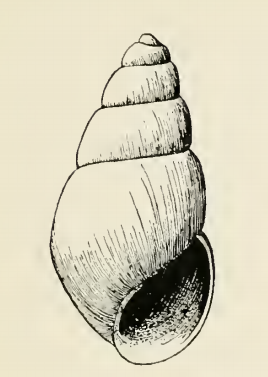
- Apertural view of a shell of Odostomia movilla

Scientific classification
- Kingdom: Animalia
- Phylum: Mollusca
- Class: Gastropoda
- Family: Pyramidellidae
- Genus: Odostomia
- Species: O. movilla

Binomial name
- Odostomia movilla Dall & Bartsch, 1909

Synonyms
- Odostomia (Evalea) movilla Dall & Bartsch, 1909

= Odostomia movilla =

Species of gastropod

Odostomia movilla is a species of sea snail, a marine gastropod mollusc in the family Pyramidellidae, the pyrams and their allies.

== Description ==
The white shell has an elongate-ovate shape. Its length is 3.6 mm. The whorls of the protoconch are deeply obliquely immersed in the first of the succeeding turns, above which only the tilted edge of the last volution projects. The five whorls of the teleoconch are feebly rounded in the middle, strongly so at the slopingly shouldered summit, and moderately contracted at the suture. The periphery is weakly angulated. The base of the shell is rather long, moderately rounded and sloping gently from the periphery to the umbilical area. The sutures are well impressed. The entire surface of the spire and base are marked by fine retractive lines of growth and numerous very fine closely spaced wavy spiral striations. The aperture is broadly oval. The posterior angle is obtuse. The outer lip is thin. The columella is slender, very strongly curved and very oblique. It is provided with a deep seated fold at its insertion. The parietal wall is covered with a thin callus.

== Distribution ==
This species occurs in the Pacific Ocean off California.
