= Odostomia hendersoni =

Scientific classification
- Kingdom: Animalia
- Phylum: Mollusca
- Class: Gastropoda
- Family: Pyramidellidae
- Genus: Odostomia
- Species: O. hendersoni

Binomial name
- Odostomia hendersoni Bartsch, 1909

Species of gastropod

Odostomia hendersoni is a species of sea snail, a marine gastropod mollusc in the family Pyramidellidae, the pyrams and their allies.

== Description ==
The shell grows to a length of 3.3 mm.

== Distribution ==
This species occurs in the following locations:

- North West Atlantic

== Notes ==
Additional information regarding this species:

- Distribution: Range: 41.5°N to 26°N; 82°W to 70.7°W. Distribution: USA: Massachusetts to North Carolina
