= Odostomia prinsi =

Scientific classification
- Kingdom: Animalia
- Phylum: Mollusca
- Class: Gastropoda
- Family: Pyramidellidae
- Genus: Odostomia
- Species: O. prinsi

Binomial name
- Odostomia prinsi van Aartsen, Gittenberger & Goud, 1998

Species of gastropod

Odostomia prinsi is a species of sea snail, a marine gastropod mollusk in the family Pyramidellidae, the pyrams and their allies.

== Description ==
The white, small shell has a decidedly rissoid shape. Its length measures 1.3 mm. The whorls of the protoconch are intorted. The teleoconch contains 2 to 2 ½ well-rounded whorls, covered with numerous rib-like striae. The sutures are clearly defined but not channeled. The periphery and the base of the body whorl are well rounded. The aperture is oval. The posterior angle is obtuse. The outer lip is thin. The small columellar tooth is well-developed and deep-seated.

== Distribution ==
This species occurs in the following locations:

- Cape Verde at a depth of 400 m.
