= Odostomia orariana =

Scientific classification
- Kingdom: Animalia
- Phylum: Mollusca
- Class: Gastropoda
- Family: Pyramidellidae
- Genus: Odostomia
- Species: O. orariana

Binomial name
- Odostomia orariana Dall & Bartsch, 1909

Synonyms
- Odostomia (Ividella) orariana Dall & Bartsch, 1909 (basionym)

Species of gastropod

Odostomia orariana is a species of sea snail, a marine gastropod mollusc in the family Pyramidellidae, the pyrams and their allies.

== Description ==
The length of an adult shell measures 2 mm. The milk-white shell is elongate, conic, and turreted. The whorls of the protoconch are deeply obliquely immersed in the first of the succeeding turns, above which only the tilted edge of the last volution projects. The six whorls of the teleoconch are strongly tabulately shouldered at the summit, flat in the middle, and sloping suddenly toward the suture. They are ornamented by slender axial ribs, of which 15 occur upon the second and 18 upon the remaining whorls. In addition to the axial ribs, the whorls are marked between the sutures by two strong spiral keels, one of which is situated at the angle of the shoulder, the other at the posterior termination of the anterior third between the sutures. The junctions of the axial ribs and spiral keels are very slightly nodulous. The sutures are deeply channeled. The periphery of the body whorl are well rounded, marked by a spiral keel. The base of the shell is well rounded. It is marked by two spiral keels, which divide the space between the peripheral keel and the umbilical area into three equal parts, and the continuation of the axial ribs, which are fainter on the base than on the spire. The aperture is ovate. The posterior angle is obtuse. The outer lip is thin, rendered angular by the keels. The columella is slender, decidedly curved, reinforced by the base. The parietal wall is covered with a thin callus.

== Distribution ==
This species occurs in the Pacific Ocean off Panama.
