= Odostomia stearnsiella =

Scientific classification
- Kingdom: Animalia
- Phylum: Mollusca
- Class: Gastropoda
- Family: Pyramidellidae
- Genus: Odostomia
- Species: O. stearnsiella

Binomial name
- Odostomia stearnsiella Pilsbry, 1918

Synonyms
- Odostomia hiloensis Pilsbry, 1918; Odostomia kahoolawensis Pilsbry, 1918; Odostomia monaulax Pilsbry, 1918

Species of gastropod

Odostomia stearnsiella is a species of sea snail, a marine gastropod mollusc in the family Pyramidellidae, the pyrams and their allies.
