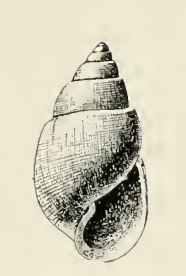
- Apertural view of a shell of Odostomia canfieldi

Scientific classification
- Kingdom: Animalia
- Phylum: Mollusca
- Class: Gastropoda
- Family: Pyramidellidae
- Genus: Odostomia
- Species: O. canfieldi

Binomial name
- Odostomia canfieldi Dall, 1908

Synonyms
- Aartsenia canfieldi Dall, 1908; Odostomia (Amaura) canfieldi Dall, 1908

= Odostomia canfieldi =

Species of gastropod

Odostomia canfieldi is a species of sea snail, a marine gastropod mollusc in the family Pyramidellidae, the pyrams and their allies.

== Description ==
The large, white, shining shell is similar in form to Odostomia (Amaura) avellana. It measures 9.6 mm and is one of the larger species within this genus. The three whorls of the protoconch are helicoid, quite elevated, deeply immersed in the first of the succeeding whorls, having their axis at a right angle to the axis of the later whorls. The six whorls of the teleoconch are well rounded, with a beveled shoulder at the summits. The sutures are simple and well marked. The periphery and the base of the body whorl are well rounded and inflated, the latter somewhat elongated. The aperture is subovate, somewhat effuse anteriorly. The posterior angle is acute. The outer lip is thin at the edge, thick within. The columella is curved and somewhat revolute, having a prominent oblique fold near its insertion. The parietal wall is covered by a thin callus.

== Distribution ==
This species occurs in the Pacific Ocean off California.
