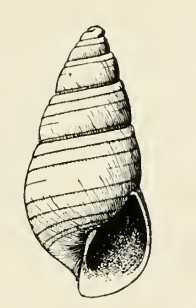
- Apertural view of the shell of Odostomia enora

Scientific classification
- Kingdom: Animalia
- Phylum: Mollusca
- Class: Gastropoda
- Family: Pyramidellidae
- Genus: Odostomia
- Species: O. enora

Binomial name
- Odostomia enora Dall & Bartsch, 1909

= Odostomia enora =

Species of gastropod

Odostomia enora is a species of sea snail, a marine gastropod mollusc in the family Pyramidellidae, the pyrams and their allies.

== Description ==
The elongate-ovate shell is milk-white. Its length measures 2.8 mm. nuclear whorls of the protoconch are deeply obliquely immersed in the first of the succeeding turns, above which only the tilted edge of the last volution projects. The six whorls of the teleoconch are well rounded, slightly contracted at the sutures and weakly shouldered at the summits. They are marked between the sutures by four feebly incised spiral grooves of which the second one above the periphery is the weakest. The periphery of the body whorl is somewhat inflated. The base of the shell is well rounded posteriorly and somewhat attenuated anteriorly. It is marked by four subequal but unequally spaced incised spiral lines. The aperture is oval and somewhat effuse anteriorly. The posterior angle is acute. The outer lip is thin. The slender columella is slightly curved and somewhat revolute, provided with a weak fold at its insertion.

== Distribution ==
This species occurs in the Pacific Ocean off California.
