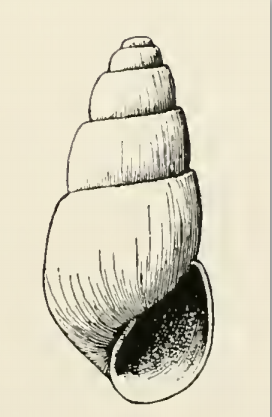
- Apertural view of a shell of Odostomia herilda

Scientific classification
- Kingdom: Animalia
- Phylum: Mollusca
- Class: Gastropoda
- Family: Pyramidellidae
- Genus: Odostomia
- Species: O. herilda

Binomial name
- Odostomia herilda Dall & Bartsch, 1909

Synonyms
- Odostomia (Evalea) herilda Dall & Bartsch, 1909 (basionym)

= Odostomia herilda =

Species of gastropod

Odostomia herilda is a species of sea snail, a marine gastropod mollusc in the family Pyramidellidae, the pyrams and their allies.

== Description ==
The light-yellow shell has an elongate-conic shape. lts length measures 3.8 mm. The whorls of the protoconch are deeply obliquely immersed in the first of the succeeding turns. The six whorls of the teleoconch are cylindric in outline, moderately rounded in the middle and very much so at the very strongly shouldered summit. The sutures are well impressed. The periphery is short, the base of the body whorl is well rounded, the latter narrowly umbilicated. The entire surface of the spire and the base is marked by numerous vertical lines of growth and exceedingly fine, closely spaced, wavy spiral striations. The aperture is ovate. The posterior angle is obtuse. The outer lip is thin. The columella is slender, somewhat sinuous, slightly reflected, provided with a deep-seated fold a little anterior to its insertion;. The parietal wall is glazed with a thin callus.

== Distribution ==
This species occurs in the Pacific Ocean off San Diego, California.
