= Odostomia suprasulcata =

Scientific classification
- Kingdom: Animalia
- Phylum: Mollusca
- Class: Gastropoda
- Family: Pyramidellidae
- Genus: Odostomia
- Species: O. suprasulcata

Binomial name
- Odostomia suprasulcata Penas & Rolan, 1999

Species of gastropod

Odostomia suprasulcata is a species of sea snail, a marine gastropod mollusc in the family Pyramidellidae, the pyrams and their allies.
