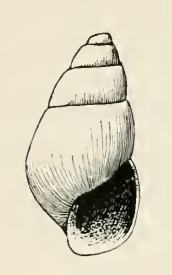
- Apertural view of a shell of Odostomia dinella

Scientific classification
- Kingdom: Animalia
- Phylum: Mollusca
- Class: Gastropoda
- Family: Pyramidellidae
- Genus: Odostomia
- Species: O. dinella

Binomial name
- Odostomia dinella Dall & Bartsch, 1909

Synonyms
- Odostomia cornadoensis Dall and Bartsch, 1909; Odostomia farella Dall and Bartsch, 1909; Odostomia orcutti Bartsch, 1917

= Odostomia dinella =

Species of gastropod

Odostomia dinella is a species of sea snail, a marine gastropod mollusc in the family Pyramidellidae, the pyrams and their allies.

== Description ==
The small shell is ovate, vitreous and semitransparent. Its length measures 2.2 mm. The five whorls of the teleoconch form a spire with almost straight sides, slightly rounded, feebly contracted at the suture, appressed at the summit. They are marked only by lines of growth. The sutures are well impressed. The periphery of the body whorl is obscurely angulated. The base of the shell is somewhat inflated, well rounded, narrowly umbilicated and marked like the spire. The aperture is ovate. The posterior angle is acute. The outer lip is thin. The columella is slender, almost vertical, slightly revolute, provided with a weak fold at its insertion. The parietal wall is covered with a strong callus.

== Distribution ==
This species occurs in the Pacific Ocean off California.
