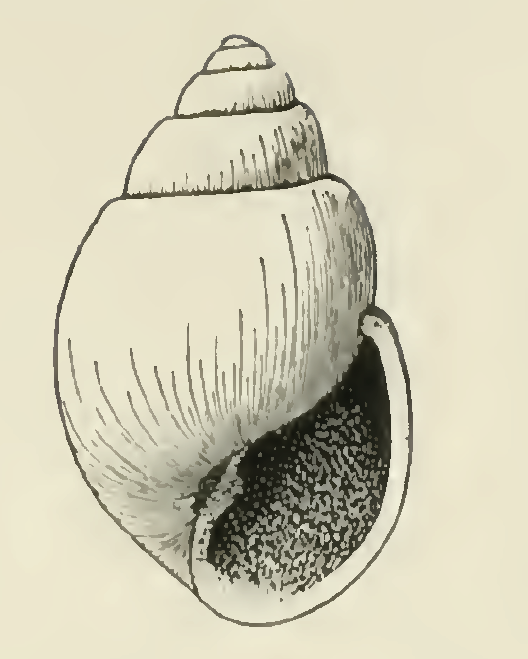
- Apertural view of Odostomia subglobosa

Scientific classification
- Kingdom: Animalia
- Phylum: Mollusca
- Class: Gastropoda
- Family: Pyramidellidae
- Genus: Odostomia
- Species: O. subglobosa

Binomial name
- Odostomia subglobosa Bartsch, 1912

Synonyms
- Aartsenia subglobosa (Bartsch, 1912)

= Odostomia subglobosa =

Species of gastropod

Odostomia subglobosa is a species of sea snail, a marine gastropod mollusc in the family Pyramidellidae, the pyrams and their allies.
