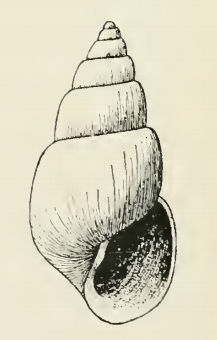
- Apertural view of a shell of Odostomia talpa

Scientific classification
- Kingdom: Animalia
- Phylum: Mollusca
- Class: Gastropoda
- Family: Pyramidellidae
- Genus: Odostomia
- Species: O. talpa

Binomial name
- Odostomia talpa Dall & Bartsch, 1909

Synonyms
- Aartsenia talpa (Dall & Bartsch, 1909); Odostomia (Amaura) talpa Dall & Bartsch, 1909 (basionym)

= Odostomia talpa =

Species of gastropod

Odostomia talpa is a species of sea snail, a marine gastropod mollusc in the family Pyramidellidae, the pyrams and their allies.

== Description ==
The stout, rough shell has a very broadly conic shape and is narrowly umbilicated. Its length measures 8 mm. The whorls of the protoconch are small, deeply obliquely immersed in the first turn of the teleoconch. The seven whorls of the teleoconch are with quite strong concavely shouldered summits, the rest well rounded (usually showing decided erosion marks which coincide largely with the lines of growth). The parts bearing the original surface show traces of exceedingly fine spiral striations. The periphery and the base of the body whorl are rather inflated, well rounded, the latter narrowly umbilicated, and marked like the spire. The aperture is broadly oval. The posterior angle is obtuse. The outer lip is rather thick. The columella is stout, thick, somewhat flexuose and reflected. It is provided with a strong fold a little anterior to the umbilicus. The parietal wall is covered by a thin callus.

== Distribution ==
The type specimen was found off Mole Harbor, Alaska.
