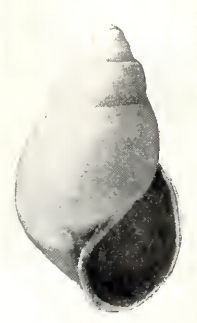
- Drawing of a shell of Odostomia franciscana

Scientific classification
- Kingdom: Animalia
- Phylum: Mollusca
- Class: Gastropoda
- Family: Pyramidellidae
- Genus: Odostomia
- Species: O. franciscana

Binomial name
- Odostomia franciscana Bartsch, 1917

Synonyms
- Evalea franciscana (Bartsch, 1917); Odostomia (Evalea) franciscana Bartsch, 1917

= Odostomia franciscana =

Species of gastropod

Odostomia franciscana is a species of sea snail, a marine gastropod mollusc in the family Pyramidellidae, the pyrams and their allies.

== Description ==
The thin, yellowish white shell has a broadly elongate conic shape. The whorls of the protoconch are small, deeply embedded in the first of the succeeding turns, above which the tilted edge of the last volution only projects. The whorls of the teleoconch are inflated, well rounded, and feebly shouldered at the summit. They are marked by almost vertical, very feeble, incremental lines and exceedingly fine, closely spaced, spiral striations. The suture is moderately constricted. The periphery of the body whorl is very feebly angulated. The base of the shell is short, inflated, well rounded, and with a very narrow umbilical chink. The aperture is large. The posterior angle is acute. The outer lip is thin. The inner lip is strongly curved, somewhat reflected and provided with a strong, oblique fold at its insertion. The parietal wall is glazed with a thin callus.

== Distribution ==
The type species was found in the Pacific Ocean off San Francisco Bay, California.
