= Odostomia eremita =

Scientific classification
- Kingdom: Animalia
- Phylum: Mollusca
- Class: Gastropoda
- Family: Pyramidellidae
- Genus: Odostomia
- Species: O. eremita

Binomial name
- Odostomia eremita Peñas & Rolán, 1999

Species of gastropod

Odostomia eremita is a species of sea snail, a marine gastropod mollusk in the family Pyramidellidae, the pyrams and their allies.

== Description ==
The shell grows to a length of 7 mm.

== Distribution ==
This marine species occurs in the following locations:

- Angola
- Cape Verde
- Republic of the Congo
