= Odostomia terissa =

Scientific classification
- Kingdom: Animalia
- Phylum: Mollusca
- Class: Gastropoda
- Family: Pyramidellidae
- Genus: Odostomia
- Species: O. terissa

Binomial name
- Odostomia terissa Pilsbry & Lowe, 1932

Synonyms
- Chrysallida terissa Pilsbry & Lowe, 1932

Species of gastropod

Odostomia terissa is a species of sea snail, a marine gastropod mollusc in the family Pyramidellidae, the pyrams and their allies.

== Distribution ==
This marine species occurs off Nicaragua.
