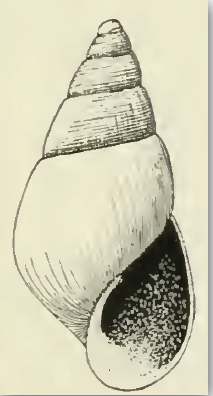
- Apertural view of Odostomia skidegatensis

Scientific classification
- Kingdom: Animalia
- Phylum: Mollusca
- Class: Gastropoda
- Family: Pyramidellidae
- Genus: Odostomia
- Species: O. skidegatensis

Binomial name
- Odostomia skidegatensis Bartsch, 1912

Synonyms
- Evalea skidegatensis (Bartsch, 1912)

= Odostomia skidegatensis =

Species of gastropod

Odostomia skidegatensis is a species of sea snail, a marine gastropod mollusc in the family Pyramidellidae, the pyrams and their allies.
