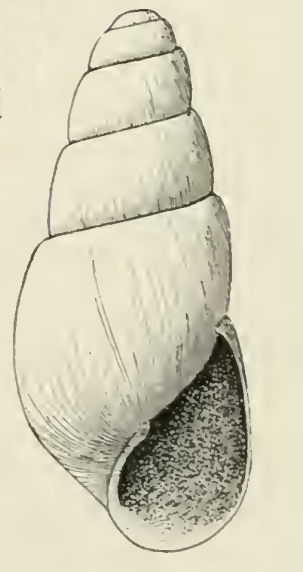
- Apertural view of Odostomia eldorana

Scientific classification
- Kingdom: Animalia
- Phylum: Mollusca
- Class: Gastropoda
- Family: Pyramidellidae
- Genus: Odostomia
- Species: O. eldorana

Binomial name
- Odostomia eldorana Bartsch, 1912

Synonyms
- Odostomia (Amaura) eldorana Bartsch, 1912 (basionym)

= Odostomia eldorana =

Species of gastropod

Odostomia eldorana is a species of sea snail, a marine gastropod mollusc in the family Pyramidellidae, the pyrams and their allies.

== Description ==
The wax-yellow shell has an elongate, conic shape. It measures 9 mm. (The nuclear whorls are decollated). The 4½ post-nuclear whorls are moderately well rounded, slightly constricted at the sutures and feebly roundly shouldered at the summit. They are marked with lines of growth and very fine spiral striations. The periphery of the body whorl is well rounded. The base of the shell is slightly protracted, well rounded, very narrowly umbilicated. The aperture is elongate ovate. The posterior angle is acute. The outer lip is thin at the edge. The inner lip is very oblique, somewhat sinuous, reflected over and adnate to the base. It is provided with a moderately strong fold, a little anterior to its insertion. The parietal wall is closed by a very thin callus.

== Distribution ==
The type specimen was found off Kodiak Island, Alaska.
