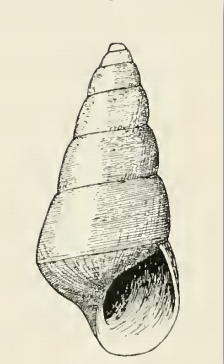
- Apertural view of the shell of Odostomia angularis

Scientific classification
- Kingdom: Animalia
- Phylum: Mollusca
- Class: Gastropoda
- Family: Pyramidellidae
- Genus: Odostomia
- Species: O. angularis

Binomial name
- Odostomia angularis Dall & Bartsch, 1907

Synonyms
- Evalea angularis Dall & Bartsch, 1907; Odostomia (Evalea) angularis Dall & Bartsch, 1907 (basionym)

= Odostomia angularis =

Species of gastropod

Odostomia angularis is a species of sea snail, a marine gastropod mollusc in the family Pyramidellidae, the pyrams and their allies.

== Description ==
The very regularly elongate-conic shell is subdiaphanous to milk-white. Its length measures 5.6 mm. The whorls of the protoconch are small, deeply obliquely immersed in the first of the succeeding turns, above which the tilted edge of the last turn only is visible. The seven whorls of the teleoconch are slightly rounded, and separated by constricted sutures. They are marked by numerous slender, wavy subequal and subequally closely spaced spiral striations, of which about 33 occur upon the last turn between the summit and the periphery. The periphery of the body whorl is marked by a slender raised keel, decidedly angulated. The base of the shell is short, moderately rounded. It is narrowly attenuated anteriorly to reinforce the columella, sculptured like the posterior portion of the whorls. The ovate aperture is very broad and slightly effuse anteriorly. The posterior angle is acute. The columella is very slender, evenly curved, closely appressed to the attenuated base, with a strong fold at its insertion, which is barely visible when the aperture is viewed squarely.

== Distribution ==
This species occurs in the Pacific Ocean off British Columbia, Canada.
