= Odostomia tasmanica =

Tasmania pyramid-shell

Scientific classification
- Kingdom: Animalia
- Phylum: Mollusca
- Class: Gastropoda
- Family: Pyramidellidae
- Genus: Odostomia
- Species: O. tasmanica

Binomial name
- Odostomia tasmanica (Tenison Woods, 1877)

Synonyms
- Styloptygma tasmanica Tenison-Woods, 1877 (basionym)

Species of gastropod

Odostomia tasmanica, common name the Tasmania pyramid-shell, is a species of sea snail, a marine gastropod mollusc in the family Pyramidellidae, the pyrams and their allies.

== Description ==
The length of the shell measures 2 mm.

== Distribution ==
This endemic species occurs in the littoral zone and offshore off Tasmania, the Bass Strait, New South Wales and Victoria.
