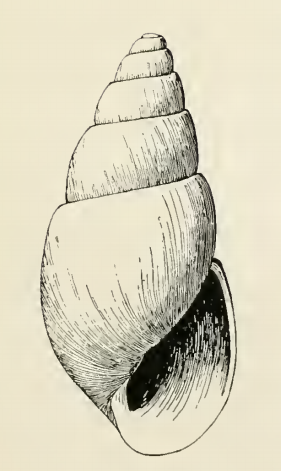
- Apertural view of a shell of Odostomia iliuliukensis

Scientific classification
- Kingdom: Animalia
- Phylum: Mollusca
- Class: Gastropoda
- Family: Pyramidellidae
- Genus: Odostomia
- Species: O. iliuliukensis

Binomial name
- Odostomia iliuliukensis Dall & Bartsch, 1909

Synonyms
- Aartsenia iliuliukensis (Dall & Bartsch, 1909); Odostomia (Amaura) iliuliukensis Dall & Bartsch, 1909

= Odostomia iliuliukensis =

Species of gastropod

Odostomia iliuliukensis is a species of sea snail, a marine gastropod mollusc in the family Pyramidellidae, the pyrams and their allies.

== Description ==
The very elongate-conic, heavy shell is very light yellow. The shell measures 9.5 mm. The nuclear whorls are small, almost completely obliquely immersed in the first of the succeeding turns. The 6 ½ post-nuclear whorls are situated rather high between the sutures. They are well rounded with narrowly tabulate summits, marked by fine, retractive lines of growth and numerous fine, closely spaced spiral striations. The sutures are well marked. The periphery of the body whorl is well rounded. The base of the shell is rather prolonged, evenly rounded, marked like the spire. The aperture is pear-shaped. The posterior angle is obtuse. The outer lip is thin at the edge, thickened within. The columella is twisted, strongly curved anteriorly, where it is also reflected and reinforced by the base. It is provided with a low fold at its insertion. The parietal wall is glazed by a thin callus.

== Distribution ==
This species occurs in the Bering Sea, Alaska.
