= Odostomia dijkhuizeni =

Scientific classification
- Kingdom: Animalia
- Phylum: Mollusca
- Class: Gastropoda
- Family: Pyramidellidae
- Genus: Odostomia
- Species: O. dijkhuizeni

Binomial name
- Odostomia dijkhuizeni van Aartsen, Gittenberger E. & Goud, 1998

Synonyms
- Odostomia (Odostomia) dijkhuizeni van Aartsen, Gittenberger E. & Goud, 1998

Species of gastropod

Odostomia dijkhuizeni is a species of sea snail, a marine gastropod mollusc in the family Pyramidellidae, the pyrams and their allies.

== Description ==
The size of the shell of this micromollusc varies between 2.3 mm and 2.5 mm.

== Distribution ==
This species occurs in the Atlantic Ocean off Mauritania.
