= Odostomia boermani =

Scientific classification
- Kingdom: Animalia
- Phylum: Mollusca
- Class: Gastropoda
- Family: Pyramidellidae
- Genus: Odostomia
- Species: O. boermani

Binomial name
- Odostomia boermani van Aartsen, Gittenberger E. & Goud, 1998

Synonyms
- Odostomia (Odostomia) boermani van Aartsen, Gittenberger E. & Goud, 1998

Species of gastropod

Odostomia boermani is a species of sea snail, a marine gastropod mollusc in the family Pyramidellidae, the pyrams and their allies.

== Description ==
The shell size varies between 2.4 mm and 2.7 mm.

== Distribution ==
This species occurs in the southeast North Atlantic off Mauritania.
