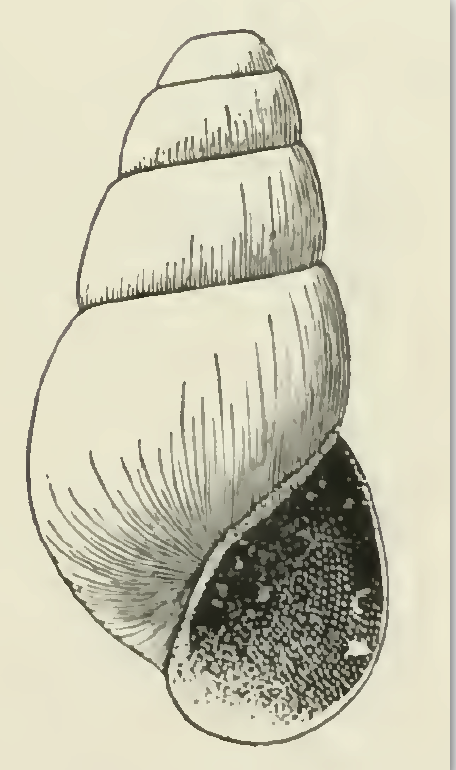
- Apertural view of Odostomia cypria

Scientific classification
- Kingdom: Animalia
- Phylum: Mollusca
- Class: Gastropoda
- Family: Pyramidellidae
- Genus: Odostomia
- Species: O. cypria

Binomial name
- Odostomia cypria Dall & Bartsch, 1912

Synonyms
- Odostomia (Evalea) cypria Dall & Bartsch, 1912

= Odostomia cypria =

Species of gastropod

Odostomia cypria is a species of sea snail, a marine gastropod mollusc in the family Pyramidellidae, the pyrams and their allies.

== Description ==
The shell is of medium size, measuring 4 mm. The shell is narrowly elongate-ovate, umbilicated, yellowish-white. The nuclear whorls are decollated. The five post-nuclear whorls lie rather high between the sutures. They are moderately rounded, very feebly shouldered at the summit,. They are marked by fine lines of growth and numerous exceedingly fine, closely spaced, spiral striations. The sutures are very slightly constricted. The periphery of the body whorl is very rounded. The base of the shell is moderately long, well rounded and narrowly umbilicated. The aperture is broadly oval, effuse anteriorly. The posterior angle is obtuse;. The outer lip is thin. The inner lip is very oblique, slightly curved and revolute, not appressed to the base. It is provided with a very deep-seated feeble fold at its insertion. The parietal wall is covered with a thick callus, which renders the peritreme complete.

== Distribution ==
This species occurs in the Pacific Ocean off British Columbia.
