= Odostomia churchi =

Scientific classification
- Kingdom: Animalia
- Phylum: Mollusca
- Class: Gastropoda
- Family: Pyramidellidae
- Genus: Odostomia
- Species: O. churchi

Binomial name
- Odostomia churchi Smith & Gordon, 1948

Species of gastropod

Odostomia churchi is a species of sea snail, a marine gastropod mollusc in the family Pyramidellidae, the pyrams and their allies.
