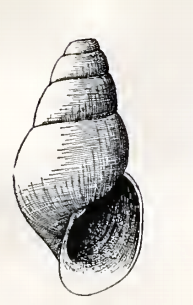
- Apertural view of the shell of Odostomia esilda

Scientific classification
- Kingdom: Animalia
- Phylum: Mollusca
- Class: Gastropoda
- Family: Pyramidellidae
- Genus: Odostomia
- Species: O. esilda

Binomial name
- Odostomia esilda Dall & Bartsch, 1909

= Odostomia esilda =

Species of gastropod

Odostomia esilda is a species of sea snail, a marine gastropod mollusc in the family Pyramidellidae, the pyrams and their allies.

== Description ==
The elongate-ovate shell is light yellow. It measures 5.5 mm. The nuclear whorls are decollated. The six post-nuclear whorls are inflated, slightly rounded in the middle, more so toward the suture, and the appressed summit. The periphery and the base of the body whorl are well rounded, the latter narrowly umbilicated. The entire surface of the spire and the base are marked by vertical lines of growth and numerous very fine, closely spaced, spiral lirations. The aperture is large, oval and slightly effuse anteriorly. The posterior angle is obtuse. The outer lip is thin. The slender columella is strongly reflected, almost closing the umbilicus. The columella is provided with a strong, deep-seated fold at its insertion.

== Distribution ==
This marine species is only known from its type locality : off San Diego, California.
