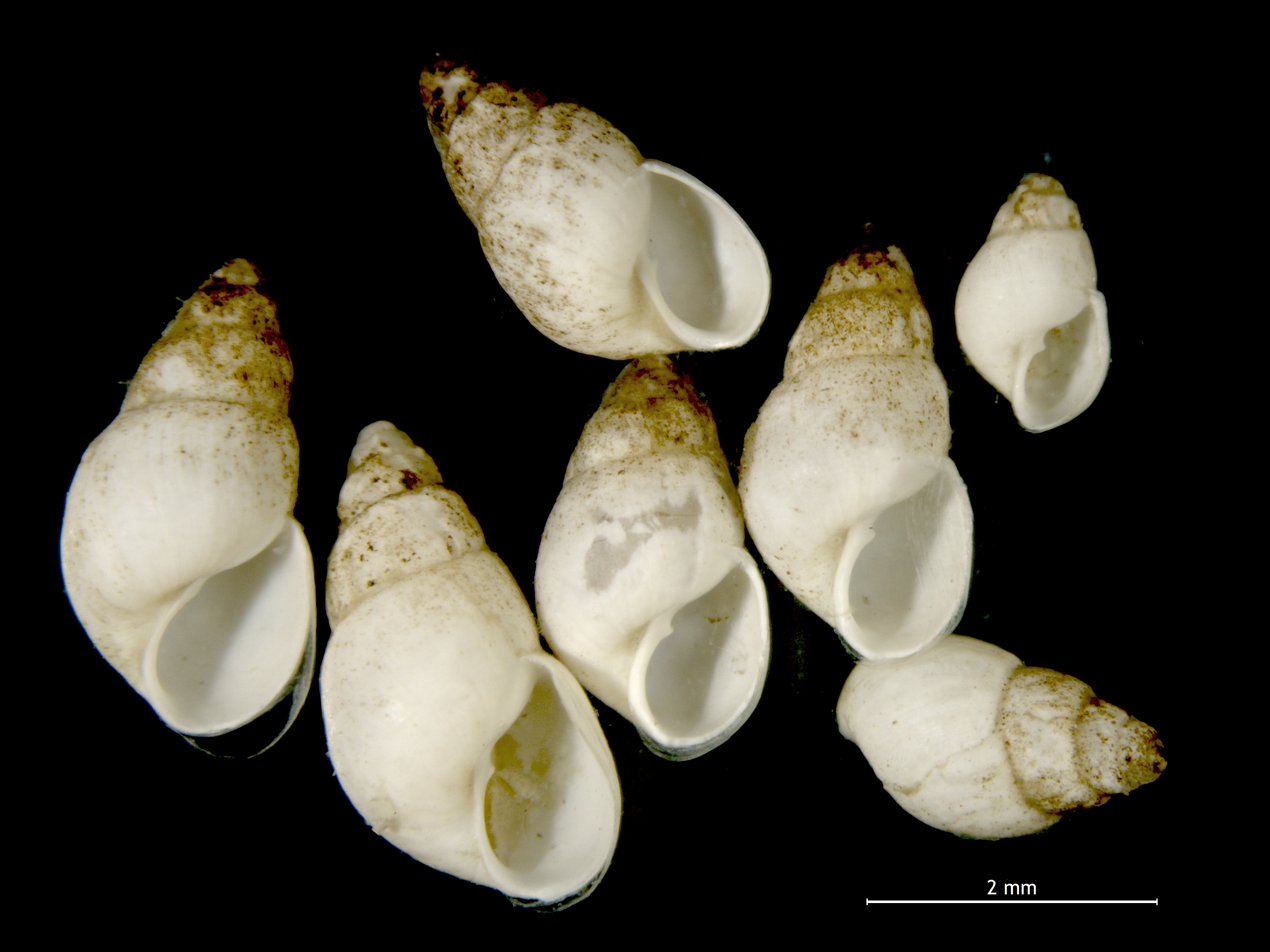

Scientific classification
- Kingdom: Animalia
- Phylum: Mollusca
- Class: Gastropoda
- Family: Pyramidellidae
- Genus: Odostomia
- Species: O. scalaris

Binomial name
- Odostomia scalaris MacGillivray, 1843

Synonyms
- Brachystomia scalaris (Macgillivray, 1843); Odostomia (Brachystomia) rissoides Hanley, 1844; Odostomia (Brachystomia) scalaris (MacGillivray, 1843); Odostomia rissoides Hanley, 1844; Odostomia scalaris var. nitida (Alder, 1844)

= Odostomia scalaris =

Species of gastropod

Odostomia scalaris is a species of sea snail, a marine gastropod mollusk in the family Pyramidellidae, the pyrams and their allies.

== Distribution ==
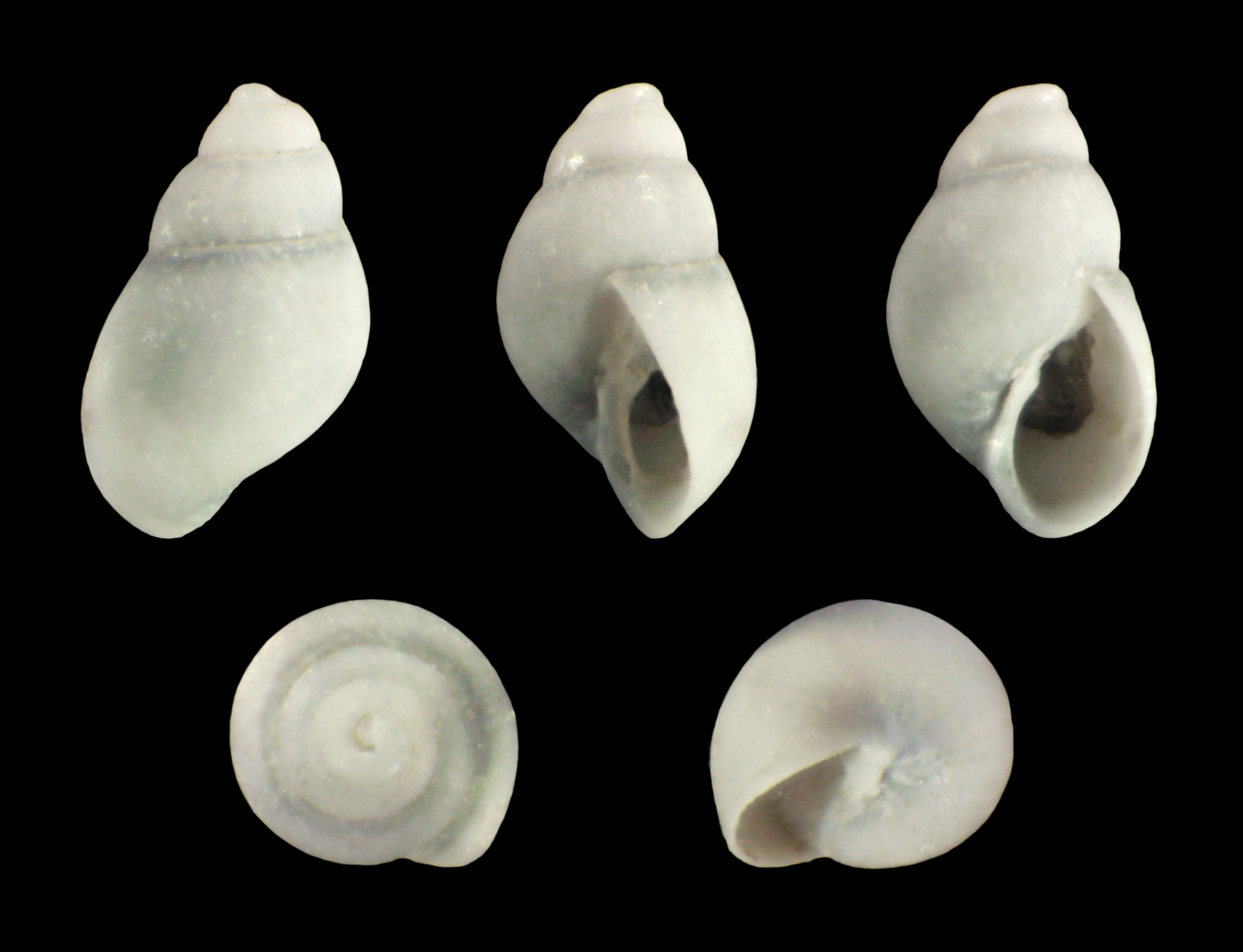
var. nitida

This species occurs in the following locations:

- Azores Exclusive Economic Zone
- Baltic sea
- Belgian Exclusive Economic Zone
- British Isles
- Dutch Exclusive Economic Zone
- European waters (ERMS scope)
- Greek Exclusive Economic Zone
- Irish Exclusive economic Zone
- Portuguese Exclusive Economic Zone
- Spanish Exclusive Economic Zone
- United Kingdom Exclusive Economic Zone
- Wimereux
- Atlantic Ocean off Mauritania at depths between 34 m and 114 m.

== Notes ==
Additional information regarding this species:

- Classification: According to Heppell (in McKay & Smith 1979) it is preferably to use Odostomia rissoides Hanley, 1844 instead of Odostomia scalaris , while Van Aartsen prefers the senior name Odostomia scalaris.
