= Odostomia verhoeveni =

Scientific classification
- Kingdom: Animalia
- Phylum: Mollusca
- Class: Gastropoda
- Family: Pyramidellidae
- Genus: Odostomia
- Species: O. verhoeveni

Binomial name
- Odostomia verhoeveni van Aartsen, Gittenberger E. & Goud, 1998

Species of gastropod

Odostomia verhoeveni is a species of sea snail, a marine gastropod mollusc in the family Pyramidellidae, the pyrams and their allies.

== Description ==
The white, shiny shell has ta slender, elongate-conic shape. The length of the shell varies between 1.8 mm and 1.8 mm. The whorls of the protoconch are helicoid. The teleoconch contains 4½ to 5 flat whorls. The almost horizontal suture is slightly channeled. The sinuous growth lines are slightly opisthocline (i.e. following the growth direction) . The sculpture is almost smooth. There is a faint spiral, microscopic striation. The outer lip is thin and smooth inside. There is sometimes a slight umbilical chink. The columellar tooth is well-developed, and situated deep inside the columella.

== Distribution ==
This species occurs in the Atlantic Ocean off Mauritania.
