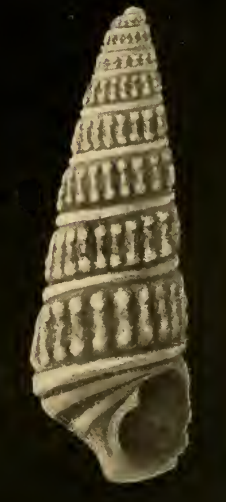
- Babella caelatior shell

Scientific classification
- Kingdom: Animalia
- Phylum: Mollusca
- Class: Gastropoda
- Family: Pyramidellidae
- Subfamily: Odostomiinae
- Tribe: Chrysallidini; Saurin, 1958

Genera
- See text

= Chrysallidini =

Tribe of molluscs

Chrysallidinae is a taxonomic group of very small sea snails, marine gastropod mollusk in the family Pyramidellidae, the pyrams and their allies.

== Taxonomy ==
Chrysallidinae has been one of eleven recognized subfamilies of the gastropod family Pyramidellidae (according to the taxonomy of Ponder & Lindberg 1997). (The other 10 subfamilies are Odostomiinae, Turbonillinae, Cingulininae, Cyclostremellinae, Sayellinae, Syrnolinae, Eulimellinae, Pyramidellinae, Odostomellinae and Tiberiinae.)

According to Schander, Van Aartsen & Corgan (1999) there are 47 genera in this subfamily, four additional genera may also be a part of this taxon.

In the taxonomy of Bouchet & Rocroi (2005), this subfamily has been downgraded to the rank of tribe Chrysallidini in the subfamily Odostomiinae.

== Genera ==
Genera in the subfamily Chrysallidinae include:

- Chrysallida Carpenter, 1856 - type genus
- Babella Dall, & Bartsch, 1906
- Bartrumella Laws, 1940
- Besla Dall & Bartsch, 1904
- Boonea Robertson, 1978
- Egila Dall, & Bartsch, 1904
- Euparthenia Thiele, 1929
- Eupyrgulina Melvill, 1910
- Eurathea Laseron, 1959
- Evalina Dall & Bartsch, 1904
- Fargoa Bartsch, 1955
- Folinella Dall, & Bartsch, 1904
- Gurmatia Dance & Eames, 1966
- Haldra Dall, & Bartsch, 1904
- Helodiamea Peñas & Rolán, 2017
- Hinemoa Oliver, 1915
- Iolaea A. Adams, 1867
- Ivara Dall & Bartsch in Arnold, 1903
- Kongsrudia Lygra & Schander, 2010
- Laseronella Whitley, 1959
- Levipyrgulina Laws, 1941
- Liamorpha Pilsbry, 1898
- Linopyrga Laws, 1941
- Menesthella Nomura, 1939
- Menestho Möller, 1842
- Miralda A. Adams, 1863
- Miraldella Bartsch, 1955
- Monotygma J. E. Gray, 1847
- Mumiola A. Adams, 1863
- Numaegilina Nomura, 1938
- Ovalina Peñas & Rolán, 2017
- Oscilla A. Adams, 1861
- Parthenina Bucquoy, Dauzenberg & Dollfus, 1883
- Perparthenina Nordsieck, 1972
- Polemicella Saurin, 1959
- Prestoniella Saurin, 1958
- Pseudoscilla Boettger, 1901
- Pukeuria Laws, 1941
- Pyrgulina A. Adams, 1863
- Quirella Laseron, 1959
- Ravnostomia Adegoke, 1977
- Salassia De Folin, 1870
- Salassiella Dall & Bartsch, 1909
- Siogamaia Nomura, 1936
- Spiralinella Chaster, 1901
- Standeniella Saurin, 1958
- Strioturbonilla Sacco, 1892
- Trabecula Monterosato, 1884
- Tragula Monterosato, 1884
- Waikura Marwick, 1931

== Possible extra genera ==
Genera likely to reside in the subfamily Chrysallidinae include:

- Raulinia Mayer, 1864
- Rugadentia Laseron, 1951
- Stylopyramis Thiele, 1929
- Taphrostomia Cossmann, 1921

== Distribution ==
This family is found worldwide, from the tropics to the Arctic.

== Shell description ==
The shell of these snails has a blunt, heterostrophic protoconch, which is often wrapped up. The texture of these shells is sculptured in various forms such as ribs and spirals. Their color is mostly white, cream or yellowish. The teleoconch is dextrally coiled, but the larval shells are sinistral. This results in a sinistrally coiled protoconch. The columella has one, spiral fold. The aperture is closed by an operculum.

== Life habits ==
The Chrysallidinae are ectoparasites, feeding mainly on other molluscs and on annelid worms.

They do not have a radula. Instead their long proboscis is used to pierce the skin of its prey and suck up its fluids and soft tissues. The eyes on the grooved tentacles are situated toward the base of the tentacles. Between the head and the foot, a lobed process called the mentum ( = thin projection) is visible.

These molluscs are hermaphrodites, laying eggs in jelly-like masses on the shell of its host.
