= Cyclostremellini =

Scientific classification
- Kingdom: Animalia
- Phylum: Mollusca
- Class: Gastropoda
- Family: Pyramidellidae
- Subfamily: Odostomiinae
- Tribe: Cyclostremellini; D. R. Moore, 1966

Species
- See text.

Tribe of gastropods

Cyclostremellini is a minor tribe, a taxonomic grouping, of minute sea snails, marine gastropod mollusks or micromollusks, in the family Pyramidellidae, the pyrams and their allies.

== Taxonomy ==
Cyclostremellinae has been a subfamily one of eleven recognised in the Pyramidellidae (according to the taxonomy of Ponder & Lindberg, 1997), and according to Schander, van Aartsen and Corgan (1999) it comprises two genera, Cyclostremella and Pseudoskenella.

In the taxonomy of Bouchet & Rocroi (2005), this subfamily has been downgraded to the rank of tribe Cyclostremellini in the subfamily Odostomiinae.

== Genera ==
Genera within the tribe Cyclostremellini include:

- Cyclostremella Bush, 1897
  - Cyclostremella californica Bartsch, 1907
  - Cyclostremella concordia Bartsch, 1920
  - Cyclostremella conradia Bartsch, 1920
  - Cyclostremella humilis Bartsch, 1897
- Pseudoskenella Ponder, 1973
  - Pseudoskenella depressa Ponder, 1973
