= Volutaxiella =

Scientific classification
- Kingdom: Animalia
- Phylum: Mollusca
- Class: Gastropoda
- Family: Pyramidellidae
- Genus: Volutaxiella; Strebel, 1908

Genus of gastropods

Volutaxiella is a genus of sea snails, marine gastropod mollusks in the family Pyramidellidae, the pyrams and their allies.

== Species ==
Species within the genus Volutaxiella include:

- Volutaxiella subantarctica Strebel, 1908
- Volutaxiella translucens Strebel, 1908
