= Levipyrgulina =

Scientific classification
- Kingdom: Animalia
- Phylum: Mollusca
- Class: Gastropoda
- Family: Pyramidellidae
- Tribe: Chrysallidini
- Genus: Levipyrgulina; Laws, 1941

Species
- See text.

Genus of gastropods

Levipyrgulina is a small genus of very small sea snails, pyramidellid gastropod mollusks or micromollusks. This genus is currently placed in the subfamily Chrysallidinae of the family Odostomiidae.

== Shell description ==
The original description of the genus and the type species can be found at:

== Life history ==
Nothing is known about the biology of the members of this genus. As is true of most members of the Pyramidellidae sensu lato, they are (were) most likely ectoparasites.

== Species within the genus Levipyrgulina ==
- Levipyrgulina sulcata Laws, 1941 (Type species) Holotype in Auckland Museum, accession number AM71008
- Levipyrgulina marginata Laws, 1941
