= Numaegilina =

Scientific classification
- Kingdom: Animalia
- Phylum: Mollusca
- Class: Gastropoda
- Family: Pyramidellidae
- Tribe: Chrysallidini
- Genus: Numaegilina; Nomura, 1938

Species
- See text

Genus of gastropods

Numaegilina is a small genus of very small sea snails, pyramidellid gastropod mollusks or micromollusks. This genus is currently placed in the subfamily Chrysallidinae of the family Odostomiidae. It was originally described as a subgenus of Chrysallida but was raised to generic status by Schander et al. (1999).A junior synonym is Paregila Laseron, 1951.

== Shell description ==
In the original description (Nomura, 1938) it is stated that the difference between this genus and "Egilina" and "Egila" is that the axial riblets are not fused at the upper and lower ends and that the sutures are not channeled. There are spiral threads seen in the intercostae whereas the intercosta in Egilina are smooth.

== Life history ==
Nothing is known about the biology of the members of this genus. As is true of most members of the Pyramidellidae sensu lato, they are most likely to be ectoparasites.

== Species ==
Species within the genus Numaegilina include:

- Numaegilina gloria (Nomura, 1938) (Type species) (as Chrysallida (Numaegilina) gloria)
- Numaegilina claudoni (Dautzenberg & Fischer, 1906)
- Numaegilina henni
- Numaegilina khmeriana Saurin, 1961
- Numaegilina obliquissima Saurin, 1959
- Numaegilina perspectiva
- Numaegilina ventricosa (Saurin, 1958)
