= Ivara =

Scientific classification
- Kingdom: Animalia
- Phylum: Mollusca
- Class: Gastropoda
- Subcohort: Panpulmonata
- Superfamily: Pyramidelloidea
- Family: Pyramidellidae
- Genus: Ivara; Dall & Bartsch in Arnold, 1903

Type species
- Odostomia turricula Dall & Bartsch in Arnold, 1903

Genus of gastropods

Ivara is a small genus of sea snails, pyramidellid gastropod mollusks or micromollusks. This genus is currently placed in the tribe Chrysallidini, of the family Odostomiidae. The Brazilian species have been revised by Pimenta et al. (2009). There are both living and fossil species in this genus.

== Shell description ==
The original description (Dall & Bartsch in Arnold 1903) is short: "Odostomias characterized by the spiral striation and tabulated whorls".

Arnold (1903) gives the following characterization of the type species: "Shell minute, ovate, thin; spire elevated; apex acute; whorls five, convex, shouldered above; surface sculptured by fine, spiral ridges and obsolete transverse ribs, more prominent near top of whorls; suture deeply impressed; body-whorl over half length of shell; shouldered above, evenly convex below; aperture truncated above, evenly rounded below; outer lip thin, extending around and up columella, forming a small columellar plication.Dimensions.- Long. 4 mm.; lat. 1.8 mm.; body whorl 2.6 mm.; aperture 1.5 mm. This delicate little shell is easily recognized by its shouldered whorls and delicate spiral sculpture. Specimens identified by Dr. Dall; but the species omitted from the text prepared by Dall and Bartsch. Rare in lower San Pedro series of Deadman Island. One specimen, which is figured, and is now in the collection of Delos Arnold. Living.-Mexical Coast (Dall). Pleistocene.-San Pedro (Arnold)."

== Life habits ==
Little is known about the biology of the members of this genus. As is true of most members of the Pyramidellidae sensu lato, they are ectoparasites.

== Species ==
Species within the genus Ivara include:

- Ivara dollfusi (Locard, 1886)
- Ivara terryi (Olsson & McGinty, 1958)
- Ivara turricula (Dall & Bartsch in Arnold, 1903) - as Odostomia turricula - type species
