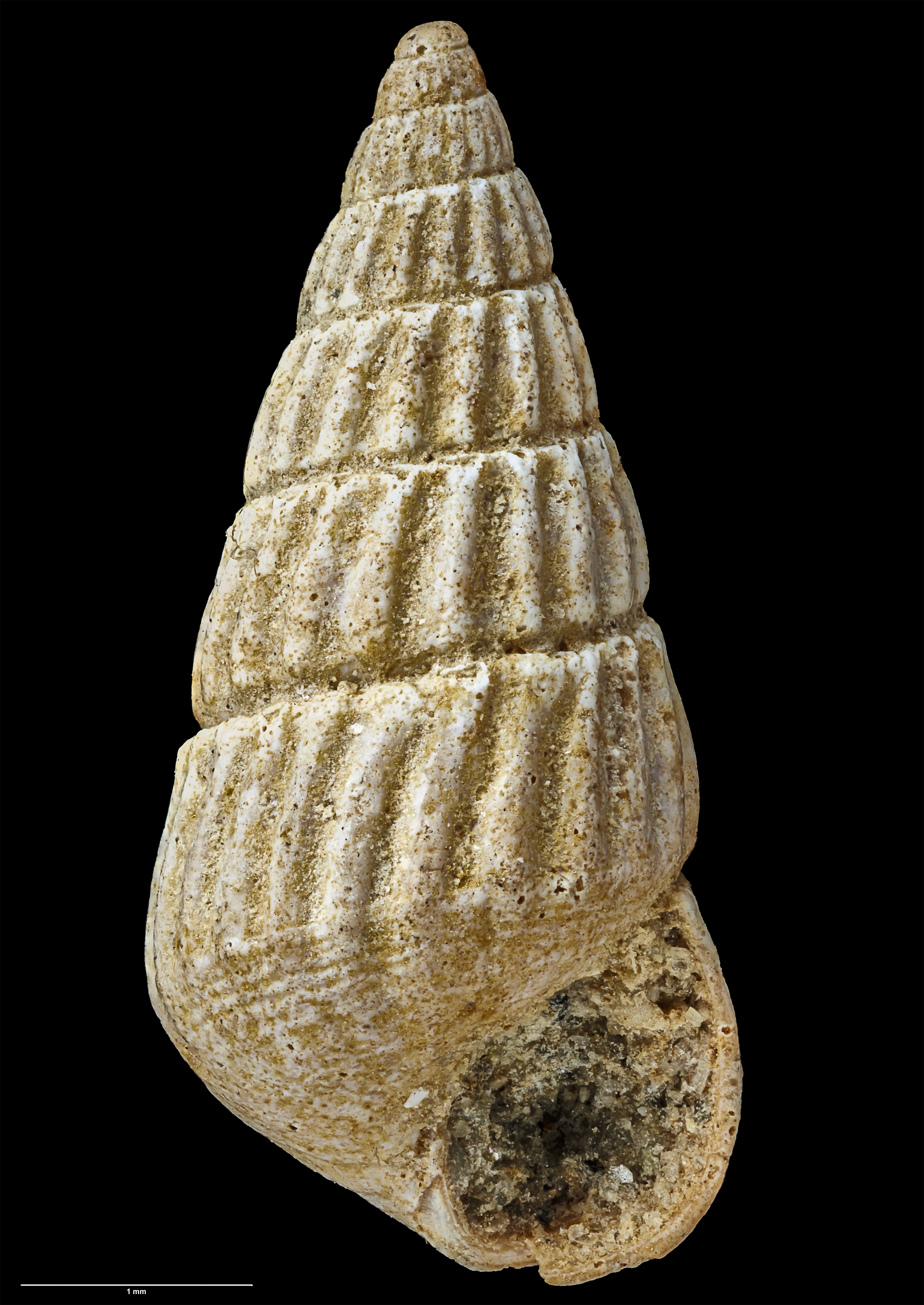
- Pukeuria anaglypta type specimen from the collections of Auckland War Memorial Museum

Scientific classification
- Kingdom: Animalia
- Phylum: Mollusca
- Class: Gastropoda
- Family: Pyramidellidae
- Tribe: Chrysallidini
- Genus: Pukeuria; Laws, 1940

Species
- See text

= Pukeuria =

Genus of gastropods

Pukeuria is a genus of very small sea snails, pyramidellid gastropod mollusks or micromollusks. This genus is currently placed in the subfamily Chrysallidinae of the family Odostomiidae.

== Shell description ==
The original genus description, and the description of the type species (Laws 1941) can be found at:

== Life history ==
Nothing is known about the biology of the members of this genus. As is true of most members of the Pyramidellidae sensu lato, they are most likely to be ectoparasites.

== Species ==
Species within the genus Pukeuria include:

- Pukeuria anaglypta Laws, 1941 (Type species)
