= Prestoniella =

Scientific classification
- Kingdom: Animalia
- Phylum: Mollusca
- Class: Gastropoda
- Family: Pyramidellidae
- Tribe: Chrysallidini
- Genus: Prestoniella; Saurin, 1958

Species
- See text

Genus of gastropods

Prestoniella is a genus of very small sea snails, pyramidellid gastropod mollusks or micromollusks. This genus is currently placed in the subfamily Chrysallidinae within the family Odostomiidae.

== Shell description ==
The original description by Laseron (1958) (in French) is extremely short and only states that the base of the shell is without spiral ribs.

== Life history ==
Nothing is known about the biology of the members of this genus. As is true of most members of the Pyramidellidae sensu lato, they are most likely to be ectoparasites.

== Species ==
Species within the genus Prestoniella include:

- Prestoniella prestoni (Dautzenberg & Fischer, 1906) (Type species) (as Pyrgulina prestoni)
- Prestoniella lamyi (Dautzenberg & Fischer, 1906)
- Prestoniella affectuosa (Yokoyama, 1927)
- Prestoniella orientalis (Nomura, 1936)
