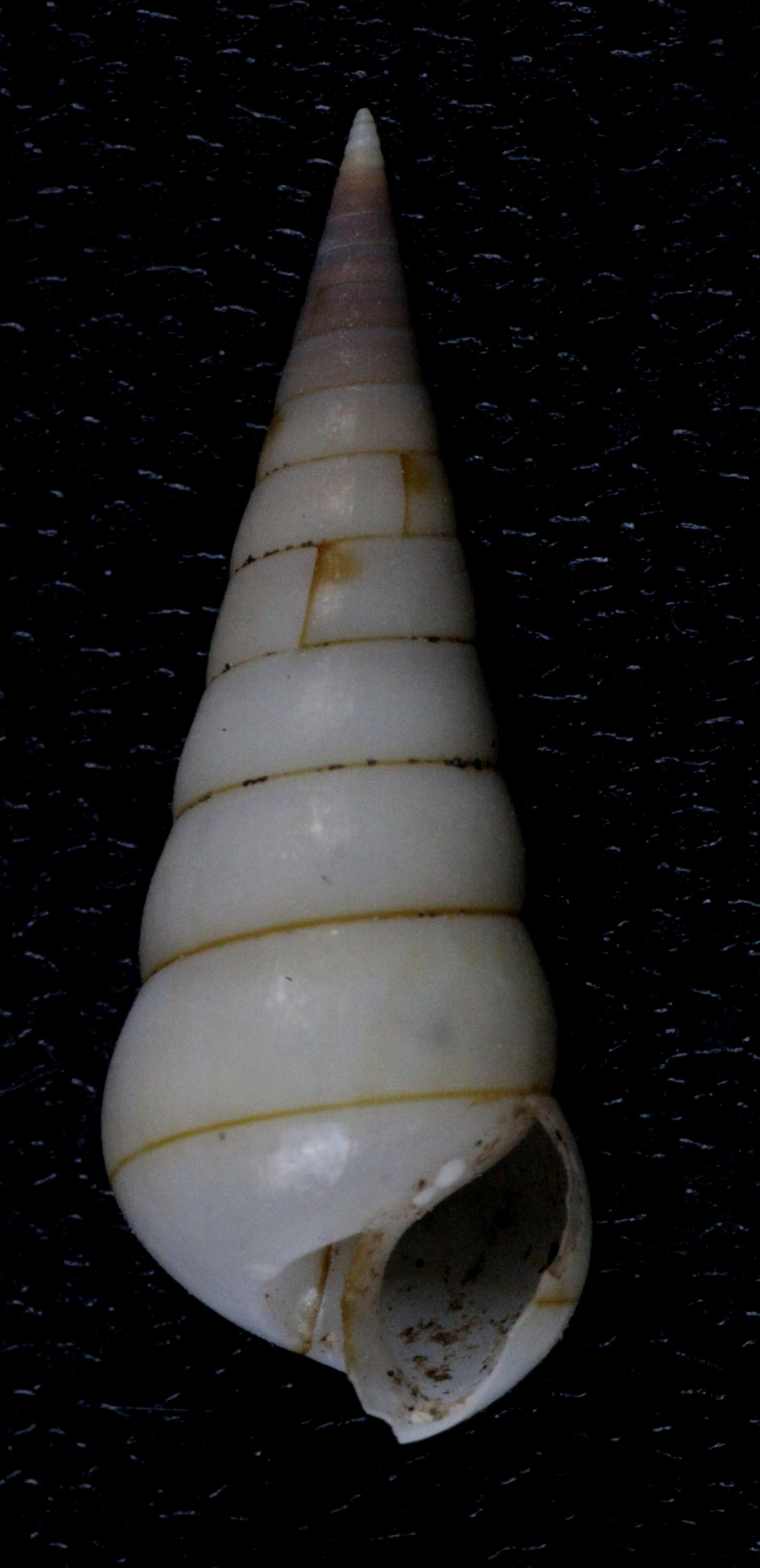
- Apertural view of a shell of Tropaeas teres

Scientific classification
- Kingdom: Animalia
- Phylum: Mollusca
- Class: Gastropoda
- Family: Pyramidellidae
- Subfamily: Syrnolinae
- Tribe: Syrnolini
- Genus: Tropaeas; Dall & Bartsch, 1904

Type species
- Pyramidella subulata A. Adams, 1853

Synonyms
- Elusa A. Adams, 1861 (Invalid: junior homonym of Elusa Walker, 1858 [Lepidoptera])

= Tropaeas =

Genus of gastropods

Tropaeas is a genus of sea snails, marine gastropod mollusks in the family Pyramidellidae, the pyrams and their allies.

== General description ==
The surface of the shell is marked by strong axial ribs. The intercostal spaces are spirally pitted. The early teleoconch whorls are sculptured differently from the later ones. The shell is umbilicated and contains two columellar folds.

== Species ==
- Tropaeas badia (A. Adams, 1863)
- Tropaeas brunneomaculata (Melvill, 1897)
- Tropaeas castanea (A. Adams, 1863)
- Tropaeas crassicostata (Sowerby III, 1901)
- Tropaeas enelata (Melvill, 1910)
- Tropaeas gracilis (A. Adams, 1854)
- Tropaeas gradatula (Melvill, J.C. & R. Standen, 1897)
- Tropaeas halaibensis Sturany, 1903
- Tropaeas imperforata Laseron, 1959
- Tropaeas livida (Sowerby III, 1901)
- Tropaeas luteomaculosa (Nomura, 1938)
- Tropaeas natalensis E. A. Smith, 1906
- Tropaeas strigulata (A.Adams, 1862)
- Tropaeas subulata (A. Adams, 1853)

Species brought into synonymy

- Tropaeas castaneus [sic] : synonym of Tropaeas castanea (A. Adams, 1863)
- Tropaeas fortiplicata Nomura, 1936: synonym of Siogamaia fortiplicata (Nomura, 1936)
- Tropaeas strigatula [sic] : synonym of Tropaeas strigulata (A. Adams, 1863)
- Tropaeas strigillata [sic] : synonym of Tropaeas strigulata (A. Adams, 1863)
- Tropaeas teres (A. Adams, 1861): synonym of Longchaeus turritus (A. Adams, 1854)

The Indo-Pacific Molluscan Database also includes the following species:

- Tropaeas contracta (Saurin, 1959)
- Tropaeas dubia (Schepman, 1909)
- Tropaeas hadwigis Thiele, 1925
- Tropaeas isolda Thiele, 1925
- Tropaeas lanassae Hornung & Mermod, 1924
- Tropaeas latonae Hornung & Mermod, 1924
- Tropaeas luteomaculosa (Nomura, 1938)
- Tropaeas secunda (Saurin, 1959)
- Tropaeas stylifera Thiele, 1925
- Tropaeas subcarnea (Schepman, 1909)
- Tropaeas subglabra (Odhner, 1919)
