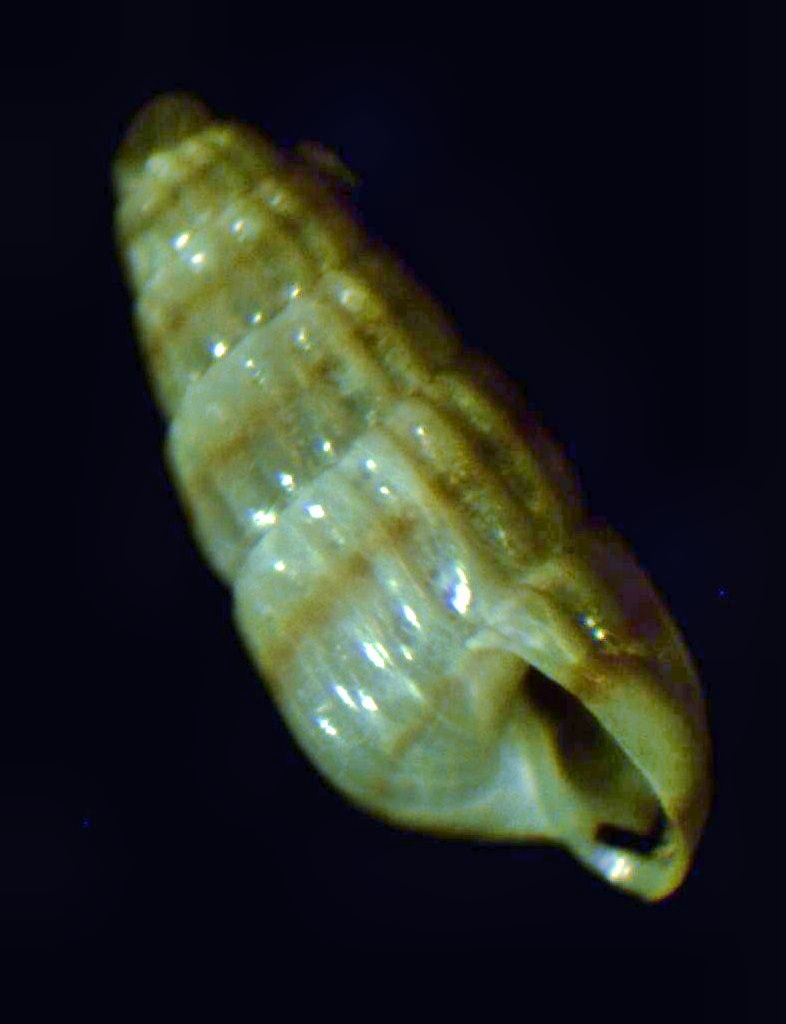
- Odostomella doliolum

Scientific classification
- Kingdom: Animalia
- Phylum: Mollusca
- Class: Gastropoda
- Family: Pyramidellidae
- Subfamily: Odostomiinae
- Tribe: Odostomellini
- Genus: Odostomella; Bucquoy, Dautzenberg & Dollfus, 1883

Type species
- Rissoa doliolum Philippi, 1844

Synonyms
- Odostomia (Odostomella) Bucquoy, Dautzenberg & Dollfus, 1883

= Odostomella =

Genus of gastropods

Odostomella is a genus of sea snails, marine gastropod mollusks in the family Pyramidellidae, the pyrams and their allies.

== Species ==
Species within the genus Odostomella include:

- Odostomella africana Schander, 1994
- † Odostomella awatubu (Nomura, 1938)
- Odostomella bicincta (Tiberi, 1868)
- Odostomella bucquoyi (Locard, 1886)
- Odostomella carceralis Pimenta, Absalao & Alencar, 2000
- Odostomella chorea (Hedley, 1909)
- Odostomella doliolum (Philippi, 1844)
- Odostomella farica (Bartsch, 1915)
- Odostomella germaini (Dautzenberg & Fischer, 1906)
- Odostomella graffeuilli Saurin, 1959
- Odostomella innocens Thiele, 1925
- Odostomella knudseni Schander, Hori & Lundberg, 1999
- Odostomella metata (Hedley, 1907)
- Odostomella nuptialis Thiele, 1925
- Odostomella opaca (Hedley, 1906)
- Odostomella patricia (Pilsbry, 1918)
- Odostomella pupa (Watson, 1886)
- Odostomella pupina (Saurin, 1959)
- Odostomella rufolineata (A. Adams, 1863)
- Odostomella virginalis Thiele, 1925

The following species were brought into synonymy

- Odostomella jeffreysiana (Monterosato, 1884): synonym of Chrysallida jeffreysiana (Monterosato, 1884)
- Odostomella nuptalis [sic]: synonym of Odostomella nuptialis Thiele, 1925
- Odostomella padangensis Thiele, 1925: synonym of Salassia padangensis (Thiele, 1925)
- Odostomella purpurea Saurin, 1959: synonym of Herviera gliriella (Melvill & Standen, 1896)
