= Liamorpha =

Scientific classification
- Kingdom: Animalia
- Phylum: Mollusca
- Class: Gastropoda
- Subcohort: Panpulmonata
- Superfamily: Pyramidelloidea
- Family: Pyramidellidae
- Genus: Liamorpha; Pilsbry, 1898

Synonyms
- Lia de Folin, 1873 (invalid: junior homonym of Lia Eschscholtz, 1829 [Coleoptera]; Liamorpha is a replacement name); Liomorpha (incorrect original spelling of Liamorpha)

Genus of gastropods

Liamorpha is a small genus of very small sea snails, pyramidellid gastropod mollusks or micromollusks.

This genus is currently placed in the subfamily Chrysallidinae of the family Odostomiidae.

== Life history ==
Nothing is known about the biology of the members of this genus. As is true of most members of the Pyramidellidae sensu lato, they are most likely to be ectoparasites.

== Species ==
- Liamorpha decorata (de Folin, 1873)
- Liamorpha elegans (de Folin, 1870)
- Liamorpha gemmifera (Dautzenberg & H. Fischer, 1906)
