= Siogamaia =

Scientific classification
- Kingdom: Animalia
- Phylum: Mollusca
- Class: Gastropoda
- Family: Pyramidellidae
- Genus: Siogamaia; Nomura, 1936

Species
- See text

Genus of gastropods

Siogamaia is a small genus of very small sea snails, pyramidellid gastropod mollusks or micromollusks. This genus is currently placed in the subfamily Chrysallidinae of the family Odostomiidae. The genus was originally described as a subgenus of Tropaeas Dall & Bartsch, 1904, but was later erected to a full genus and placed within Chysallidinae by Schander et al. (1999).

== Shell description ==
The original genus description (Nomusa 1936), states that Siogamaia is a shell of moderate size with many whorls. The outline is elongate-conical in outline. The surface is marked by weak axial ribs that are mostly shown in the earlier whorls. The interspaces between the ribs are smooth. The Aperture is obliquely ovate with a single distinct columellar fold. The outer lip is smooth within,

== Life history ==
Nothing is known about the biology of the members of this genus. As is true of most members of the Pyramidellidae sensu lato, they are most likely to be ectoparasites.

== Species ==
Species within the genus Siogamaia include:

- Siogamaia fortiplicata (Nomura, 1936) (Type species) (AsTropaeas (Siogamaia) fortiplicata)
- Siogamaia akasakiensis Nomura, 1936
- Siogamaia akatiperipherata Nomura, 1936
- Siogamaia asamusi Nomura, 1936
- Siogamaia desiderabilis Nomura, 1936
- Siogamaia kinkwazan Nomura, 1937
- Siogamaia morioria (Laws, 1941)
- Siogamaia minamotoi (Nomura, 1936)
- Siogamaia namensis (Corgan & Van Aartsen, 1998)
- Siogamaia odostomoides Nomura, 1937
- Siogamaia problematica (Nomura, 1936)
- Siogamaia quantoensis Nomura, 1937
- Siogamaia semiplicata (Turton, 1932)
- Siogamaia takonourana (Nomura, 1936)
- Siogamaia venus (Nomura, 1936)
