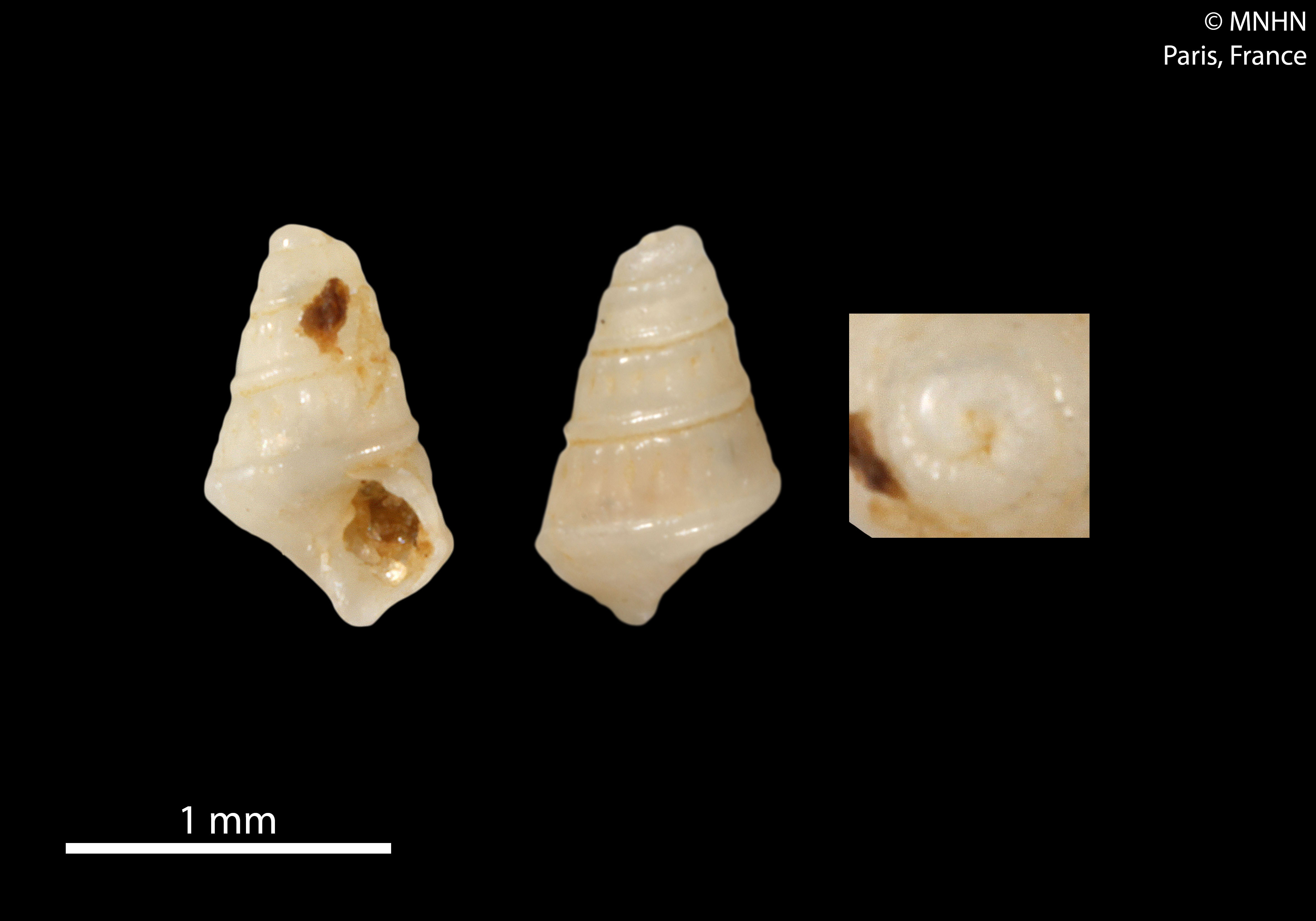
- Shell of Egila ektopa (specimen at MNHN, Paris)

Scientific classification
- Kingdom: Animalia
- Phylum: Mollusca
- Class: Gastropoda
- Subcohort: Panpulmonata
- Superfamily: Pyramidelloidea
- Family: Pyramidellidae
- Genus: Egila; Dall & Bartsch, 1904

Type species
- Odostomia lacunata Carpenter, 1857

= Egila =

Egila Temporal range: Cenozoic

Genus of gastropods

Egila is a genus of small sea snails, marine gastropod mollusks in the family Pyramidellidae, the pyrams and their allies.

This genus was previously placed in the tribe Chrysallidini of the family Odostomiidae. It has both extant and fossil (Cenozoic) members.

== Life habits ==
Little is known about the biology of the members of this genus. As is true of most members of the Pyramidellidae sensu lato, they are most likely to be ectoparasites.

== Species ==
Species within the genus Egila include:

- † Egila arcuata Laws, 1941
- Egila australis Laseron, 1959
- Egila curtisensis Laseron, 1959
- Egila ektopa Pimenta & Absalão, 2004
- Egila lacunata (Carpenter, 1857) - type species, as Odostomia (Parthenia) lacunata
- Egila poppei (Dall & Bartsch, 1909)
- Egila univestis Laseron, 1959
- Egila virginiae van Regteren Altena, 1975

Species brought into synonymy

- Egila articulata (Hedley, 1909) : synonym of Besla articulata (Hedley, 1909)
- Egila mayii (Tate, 1898): synonym of Chrysallida mayii (Tate, 1898)
- Egila spiralis Laseron, 1959 : synonym of Chrysallida spiralis (Laseron, 1959)
- Egila typica Laseron, 1959 : synonym of Parthenina typica (Laseron, 1959) (original combination)

The species of Egila from Brazil have been reviewed by Piementa & Absalão (2004).
