= Gurmatia =

Gurmatia Temporal range: Holocene

Scientific classification
- Kingdom: Animalia
- Phylum: Mollusca
- Class: Gastropoda
- Family: Pyramidellidae
- Subfamily: Odostomiinae
- Tribe: Chrysallidini
- Genus: Gurmatia; Dance & Eames, 1966

Species
- See text

Extinct genus of gastropods

Gurmatia is an extinct small genus of pyramidellid gastropod mollusks or micromollusks in the family Pyramidellidae.

The genus is known only from fossils (Holocene).

== Shell description ==
The shell in this genus is small, ovate-conic, thin and translucent. The protoconch is heterostrophic and smooth, and it is obliquely immersed in the first adult whorl.

The adult shell has a sculpture of spiral cords which are separated by deep grooves. The spiral cords have numerous transverse threads in their intervals.

The straight, vertical aperture lacks the fold that most members of Odostomiinae have. The shell opening (aperture) is truncate-subovate.

Compared to Euparthenia Thiele, 1929, Gurmatia lacks a columellar fold and has no axial ribs. Compared to Monotygma J. E. Gray, 1847 (=Actaeopyramis Fisher, 1885) it is considerably smaller, and is more strongly shouldered.

The type species is Gurmatia wilkinsi Dance & Eames, 1966. This is a small shell. It is ovate-conic in outline, thin and translucent. The protoconch is smooth, heterostrophic and obliquely immersed in the succeeding whorl. The post-nuclear whorls with spiral cords are separated by deep grooves. The spiral cords are with numerous, transverse threads in their intervals. The columella is without folds (teeth) and straight and vertical. The aperture is truncate to subovate and imperforate.

Compared to Euparthenia - Gurmatia has lacks axial ribs and columellar folds. Compared to Actaeopyramis, it is much smallerand with fewer whorl that are more strongly shouldered. It is less turreted, lacking spiral rows of punctae in the intervals between the spiral cordons. The spiral cordons themselves are relatively stronger. If compared to Leucotina, it is less ovate and has a higher spire with more shouldered whorls. The last whorl is also less prominently convex. It is lacking the spiral rows of punctae between the spiral cordons, and shows no trace of a columellar fold."

The shell of the type species is small and thin, ovate-conic, white to semi-translucid. The protoconch is smooth, consisting of one and half whorls obliquely immersed in the succeeding whorl. Three post-nuclear whorls that are moderately convex and gently shouldered, with a deep linear suture. The spire occupies about 2/3 of the total height of the shell. The sculpture consists of 5-7 rounded, equidistant, spiral cords separated by deep spiral grooves of about equal width. The spiral cords has numerous, regularly spaced, procurrent transverse threads (about 1/2 to 1/3 the width of their intervals) between them. The base of the last whorl has six to seven additional spiral cords which become weaker abapically. The aperture is truncate to subovate. The outer lip is thin and semi-transparent, practically straight and gently procurrent. It is smooth internally. The columella is perpendicular and without folds. It is Imperforate.

The measurements of the holotype are: Height 26 mm. Width 1–2 mm, and of the paratype: Height 3–1 mm. Width 1–0 mm. Type locality:. Gurmat Ali, right bank, 56 ft below surface of Alluvium holotype; Recent, Madras, M. D. Crichton leg., one paratype.

== Life habits ==
Little is known about the biology of the members of this genus. As is true of most members of the Pyramidellidae sensu lato, they are most likely ectoparasites.

== Species ==
Species within the genus Gurmatia include:

- † Gurmatia wilkinsi Dance & Eames, 1966 - type species, deposited at The Natural History Museum, London with access number B.M.N.H. 196528.
- † Gurmatia pulchrior (Melvill, 1904)
