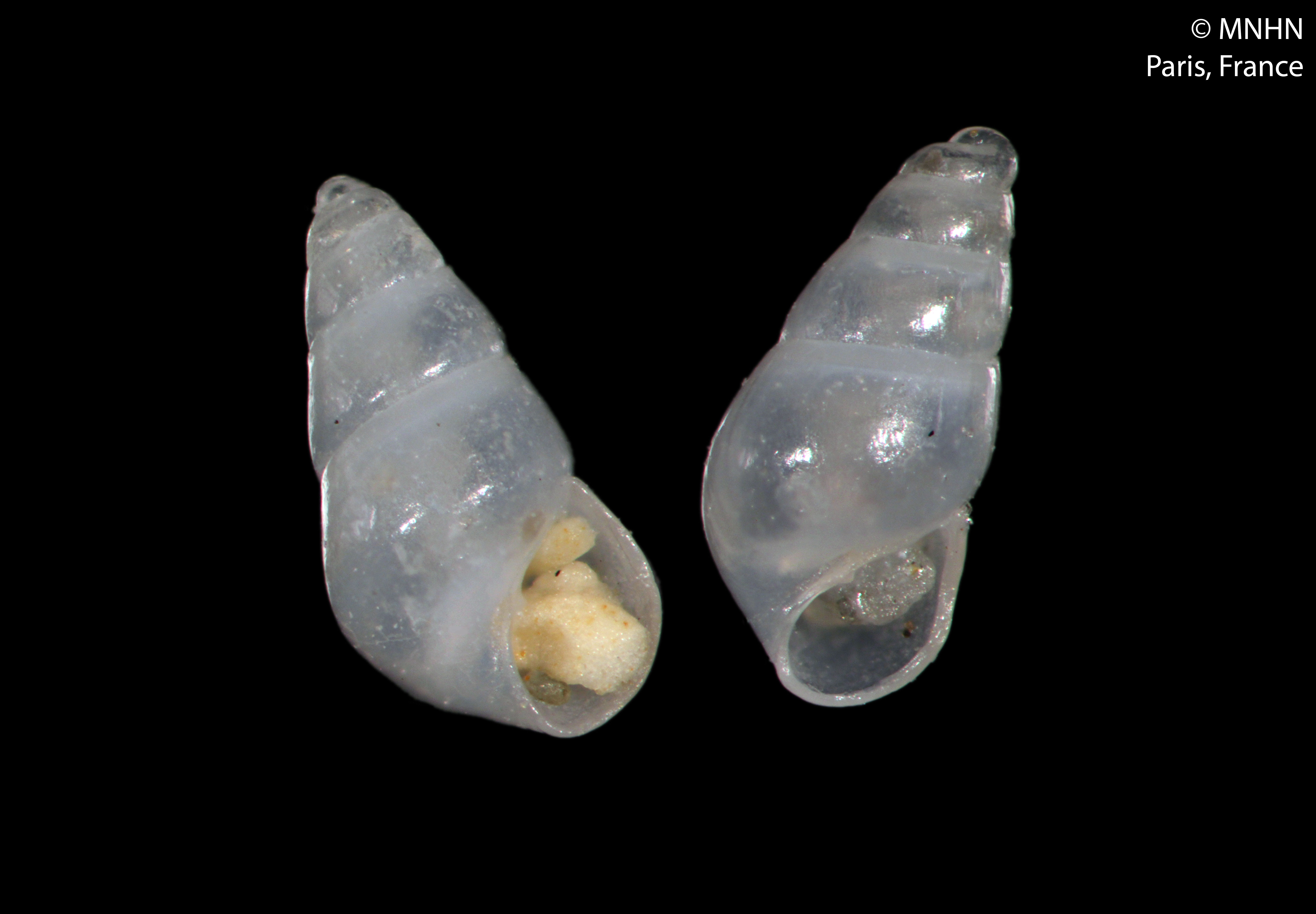

Scientific classification
- Kingdom: Animalia
- Phylum: Mollusca
- Class: Gastropoda
- Family: Pyramidellidae
- Genus: Odostomia
- Species: O. kromi

Binomial name
- Odostomia kromi van Aartsen, Menkhorst & Gittenberger, 1984

Synonyms
- Odostomia (Odostomia) kromi van Aartsen, Menkhorst & Gittenberger, 1984

= Odostomia kromi =

Species of gastropod

Odostomia kromi is a species of sea snail, a marine gastropod mollusc in the family Pyramidellidae, the pyrams and their allies. The species belongs to the subfamily Odostomiinae, a group of minute marine heterobranch gastropods.

== Description ==
Members of the genus Odostomia generally possess minute, whitish or yellowish shells, ranging from conical to ovate-conical in shape. The shell grows to a length of 1.7 mm (0.067 in). Its distribution is largely throughout the Mediterranean Sea

== Distribution ==
This species occurs in the following locations:

- European waters (ERMS scope)
- Portuguese Exclusive Economic Zone
- Spanish Exclusive Economic Zone : Alboran Sea
