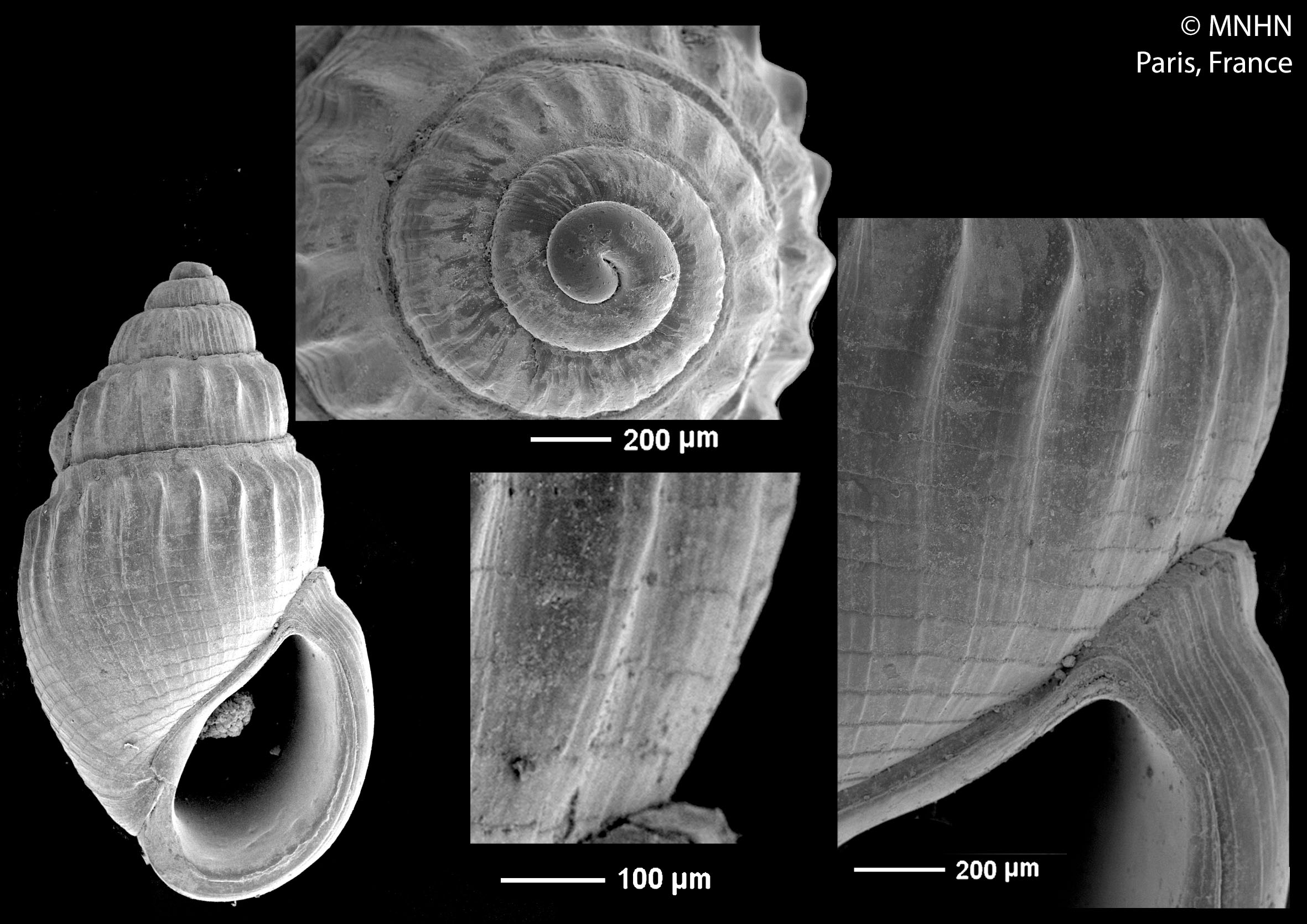
- Shell of Eurathea rissoiformis (holotype at MNHN, Paris)

Scientific classification
- Kingdom: Animalia
- Phylum: Mollusca
- Class: Gastropoda
- Subcohort: Panpulmonata
- Superfamily: Pyramidelloidea
- Family: Pyramidellidae
- Genus: Eurathea; Laseron, 1959

Type species
- Eurathea humerica Laseron, 1959

= Eurathea =

Genus of gastropods

Eurathea is a small genus of very small sea snails, pyramidellid gastropod mollusks or micromollusks in the tribe Chrysallidini within the family Pyramidellidae.

== Distribution ==
So far, species in this genus have been described from Australia, Vanuatu and the Solomon Islands.

== Life habits ==
Little is known about the biology of the members of this genus. As is true of most members of the Pyramidellidae sensu lato, they are ectoparasites.

== Species ==
Species within the genus Eurathea include:

- Eurathea humerica Laseron, 1959 - type species, the type locality is Darwin, Australia. The length of the shell is 3.2 mm.
- Eurathea rissoiformis Peñas & Rolán, 2017
- Eurathea solomonensis Peñas & Rolán, 2017
