= Tropaeas natalensis =

Scientific classification
- Kingdom: Animalia
- Phylum: Mollusca
- Class: Gastropoda
- Family: Pyramidellidae
- Genus: Tropaeas
- Species: T. natalensis

Binomial name
- Tropaeas natalensis E. A. Smith, 1906

Synonyms
- Tropeas natalensis E. A. Smith, 1906

Species of gastropod

Tropaeas natalensis is a species of sea snail, a marine gastropod mollusk in the family Pyramidellidae, the pyrams and their allies.
