= Haldra =

Scientific classification
- Kingdom: Animalia
- Phylum: Mollusca
- Class: Gastropoda
- Family: Pyramidellidae
- Tribe: Chrysallidini
- Genus: Haldra; Dall & Bartsch, 1904

Species
- See text

Genus of gastropods

Haldra is a genus of pyramidellid gastropod mollusks or micromollusks in the tribe Chrysallidini within the family Pyramidellidae.

== Life habits ==
Little is known about the biology of the members of this genus. As is true of most members of the Pyramidellidae sensu lato, they are likely to be ectoparasites.

== Species ==
Species within the genus Haldra include:

- Haldra photis (Carpenter, 1857) - type species as Odostomia (Chrysallida) photis
