= Eulimastoma surinamense =

Scientific classification
- Kingdom: Animalia
- Phylum: Mollusca
- Class: Gastropoda
- Family: Pyramidellidae
- Genus: Eulimastoma
- Species: E. surinamense

Binomial name
- Eulimastoma surinamense Altena, 1975

Species of gastropod

Eulimastoma surinamense is a species of sea snail, a marine gastropod mollusk in the family Pyramidellidae, the pyrams and their allies.
