= Eulimastoma harbisonae =

Scientific classification
- Kingdom: Animalia
- Phylum: Mollusca
- Class: Gastropoda
- Family: Pyramidellidae
- Genus: Eulimastoma
- Species: E. harbisonae

Binomial name
- Eulimastoma harbisonae Bartsch, 1955

Species of gastropod

Eulimastoma harbisonae is a species of sea snail, a marine gastropod mollusk in the family Pyramidellidae, the pyrams and their allies.

== Distribution ==
This species occurs in the following locations:

- Gulf of Mexico
