= Pseudoskenella =

Scientific classification
- Kingdom: Animalia
- Phylum: Mollusca
- Class: Gastropoda
- Family: Pyramidellidae
- Tribe: Cyclostremellini
- Genus: Pseudoskenella; Ponder, 1973

Genus of gastropods

Pseudoskenella is a genus of sea snails, marine gastropod mollusks in the family Pyramidellidae, the pyrams and their allies.

== Species ==
Species within the genus Pseudoskenella include:

- Pseudoskenella depressa Ponder, 1973
