= Sinuatodostomia labunensis =

Scientific classification
- Kingdom: Animalia
- Phylum: Mollusca
- Class: Gastropoda
- Family: Pyramidellidae
- Genus: Sinuatodostomia
- Species: S. labunensis

Binomial name
- Sinuatodostomia labunensis Robba, Di Geronimo, Chaimanee, Negri & Sanfilippo, 2004

Species of gastropod

Sinuatodostomia labunensis is a species of sea snail, a marine gastropod mollusk in the family Pyramidellidae, the pyrams and their allies.
