= Tropaeas gracilis =

Scientific classification
- Kingdom: Animalia
- Phylum: Mollusca
- Class: Gastropoda
- Family: Pyramidellidae
- Genus: Tropaeas
- Species: T. gracilis

Binomial name
- Tropaeas gracilis (A. Adams, 1854)

Species of gastropod

Tropaeas gracilis is a species of sea snail, a marine gastropod mollusk in the family Pyramidellidae, the pyrams and their allies.
