= Eulimastoma engonium =

Scientific classification
- Kingdom: Animalia
- Phylum: Mollusca
- Class: Gastropoda
- Family: Pyramidellidae
- Genus: Eulimastoma
- Species: E. engonium

Binomial name
- Eulimastoma engonium (Bush, 1885)

Synonyms
- Eulimella engonia (Bush, 1885); Odostomia engonia Bush, 1885 (basionym); Odostomia (Eulimastoma) engonium (Bush, 1885); Odostomia (Eulimastoma) weberi Absalão, R.S., F.N. dos Santos & D. d' Oliveira Tenório, 1996; Odostomia teres Bush, 1885

Species of gastropod

Eulimastoma engonium, common name the needle odostome, is a species of sea snail, a marine gastropod mollusk in the family Pyramidellidae, the pyrams and their allies.

== Description ==
The shell is white and lustrous. Its length measures 6.5 mm. The seven whorls of the teleoconch are flattened, distinctly chamfered above the channeled suture. The body whorl is distinctly angulated at the periphery, where there is a prominent rounded thread. There are also numerous indistinct, unequal striae only visible under a microscope. The columella has a small distinct fold, not seen in a front view.

== Distribution ==
This species occurs in the following locations:

- Caribbean Sea
- Colombia
- Gulf of Mexico
- Cape Hatteras, North Carolina, USA
