= Evalina =

Scientific classification
- Kingdom: Animalia
- Phylum: Mollusca
- Class: Gastropoda
- Family: Pyramidellidae
- Tribe: Chrysallidini
- Genus: Evalina; Dall & Bartsch, 1904

Species
- See text.

Genus of gastropods

Evalina is a small genus of sea snails, pyramidellid gastropod mollusks in the tribe Chrysallidini within the family Pyramidellidae.

The genus has both Recent and fossil members.

== Life habits ==
Little is known about the biology of the members of this genus. As is true of most members of the Pyramidellidae sensu lato, they are ectoparasites.

== Species ==
Species within the genus Evalina include:

- Evalina americana Dall & Bartsch, 1904 - type species, as Odostomia (Evalina) americana
- Evalina nishiana (Yokoyama, 1927)
- Evalina peasei (Dautzenberg & Bouge, 1933)
- Evalina waikikiensis (Pilsbry, 1918)
- Evalina winkleyi (Bartsch, 1909)
- ...
