= Polemicella aartseni =

Scientific classification
- Kingdom: Animalia
- Phylum: Mollusca
- Class: Gastropoda
- Family: Pyramidellidae
- Genus: Polemicella
- Species: P. aartseni

Binomial name
- Polemicella aartseni Robba, Di Geronimo, Chaimanee, Negri & Sanfilippo, 2004

Species of gastropod

Polemicella aartseni is a species of sea snail, a marine gastropod mollusk in the family Pyramidellidae, the pyrams and their allies.

== Distribution ==
This marine species occurs off Thailand.
