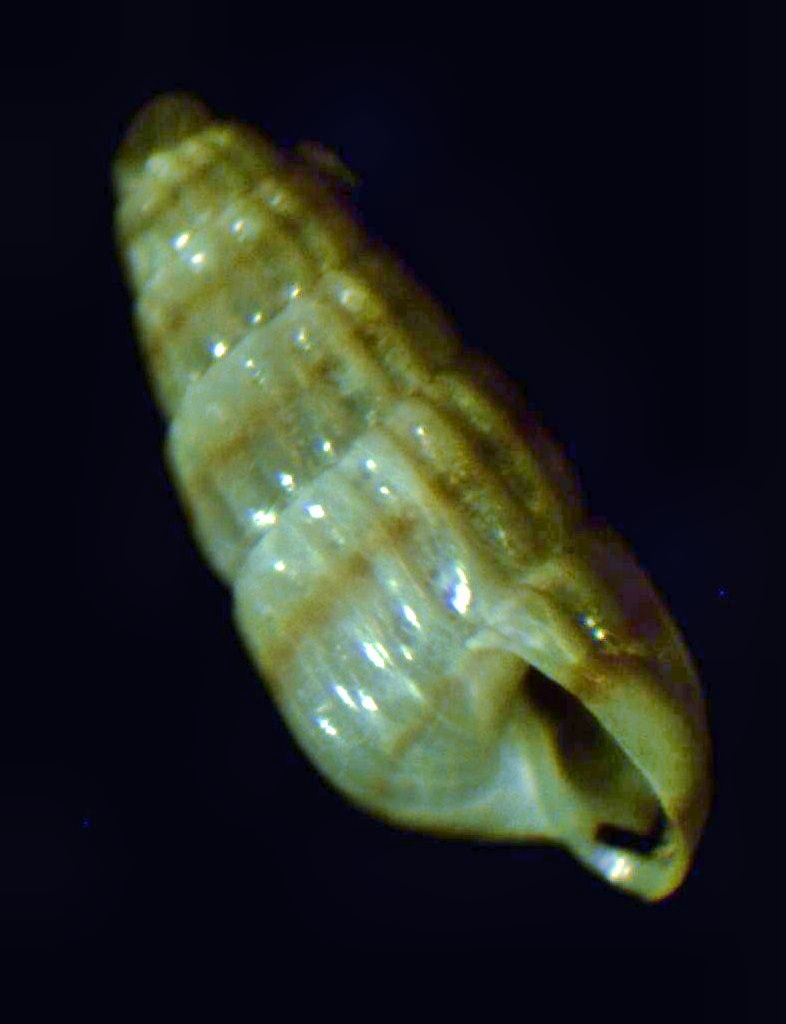
- Odostomella doliolum

Scientific classification
- Domain: Eukaryota
- Kingdom: Animalia
- Phylum: Mollusca
- Class: Gastropoda
- Family: Pyramidellidae
- Subfamily: Odostomiinae
- Tribe: Odostomellini; Saurin, 1958

Genera
- See text.

Synonyms
- Odostomellinae

= Odostomellini =

Tribe of gastropods

Odostomellini is a taxonomic tribe of minute sea snails, marine gastropod molluscs within the family Pyramidellidae the pyrams and their allies.

== Taxonomy ==
Odostomellinae has been one of eleven recognised subfamilies of the family Pyramidellidae (according to the taxonomy of Ponder & Lindberg, 1997). The subfamily contains two genera: Herviera and Odostomella (Schander and co-workers 1999).

In the taxonomy of Bouchet & Rocroi (2005), this subfamily has been downgraded to the rank of tribe Odostomellini in the subfamily Odostomiinae.

== Genera ==
Genera within the tribe Odostomellini include:

- Odostomella Bucquoy, Dautzenberg & Dollfus, 1883 - type genus of the tribe Odostomellini
- Heviera Melvill & Standen, 1899

== Distribution ==
The subfamily occurs in tropic and temperate seas.

== Shell description ==
The shell of these snails has a blunt, heterostrophic protoconch, which is wrapped up. The texture of these shells is sculptured with ribs. Their color is mostly white, brown, cream or yellowish, sometimes with red or brown lines. The teleoconch is dextrally coiled, but the larval shells are sinistral. This results in a sinistrally coiled protoconch. The aperture is closed by an operculum.

== Life habits ==
The Odostomellinae are ectoparasites, but the hosts are unknown.

They do not have a radula. Instead their long proboscis is used to pierce the skin of its prey and suck up its fluids and soft tissues. The eyes on the grooved tentacles are situated toward the base of the tentacles. Between the head and the foot, a lobed process called the mentum (= thin projection) is visible.

These molluscs are hermaphrodites, laying eggs in jelly-like masses on the shell of its host. Some species have spermatophores (Schander, Hori & Lundberg, 1999).
