= Odostomella carceralis =

Scientific classification
- Kingdom: Animalia
- Phylum: Mollusca
- Class: Gastropoda
- Family: Pyramidellidae
- Genus: Odostomella
- Species: O. carceralis

Binomial name
- Odostomella carceralis Pimenta, Absalao & Alencar, 2000

Species of gastropod

Odostomella carceralis is a species of sea snail, a marine gastropod mollusk in the family Pyramidellidae, the pyrams and their allies.
