= Jordaniella =

Scientific classification
- Domain: Eukaryota
- Kingdom: Animalia
- Phylum: Mollusca
- Class: Gastropoda
- Subcohort: Panpulmonata
- Superfamily: Pyramidelloidea
- Family: Pyramidellidae
- Genus: Jordaniella; Chaster, 1898

Type species
- Turbo nivosus Montagu, 1803

Synonyms
- Jordanula Chaster, 1901 (unnecessary replacement name for Jordaniella); Odostomia (Jordaniella) Chaster, 1898; Odostomia (Jordanula) Chaster, 1901

Genus of gastropods

Jordaniella is a genus of very small sea snails, minute marine gastropod mollusks or micromollusks in the subfamily Odostomiinae of the Pyramidellidae.

== Species ==
- Jordaniella nivosa (Montagu, 1803)
- Jordaniella truncatula (Jeffreys, 1850)
