= Eurathea humerica =

Scientific classification
- Kingdom: Animalia
- Phylum: Mollusca
- Class: Gastropoda
- Family: Pyramidellidae
- Genus: Eurathea
- Species: E. humerica

Binomial name
- Eurathea humerica Laseron, 1959

Species of gastropod

Eurathea humerica is a species of sea snail, a marine gastropod mollusk in the family Pyramidellidae, the pyrams and their allies.
