= Tropaeas crassicostata =

Scientific classification
- Kingdom: Animalia
- Phylum: Mollusca
- Class: Gastropoda
- Family: Pyramidellidae
- Genus: Tropaeas
- Species: T. crassicostata

Binomial name
- Tropaeas crassicostata (Sowerby III, 1901)

Species of gastropod

Tropaeas crassicostata is a species of sea snail, a marine gastropod mollusk in the family Pyramidellidae, the pyrams and their allies.
