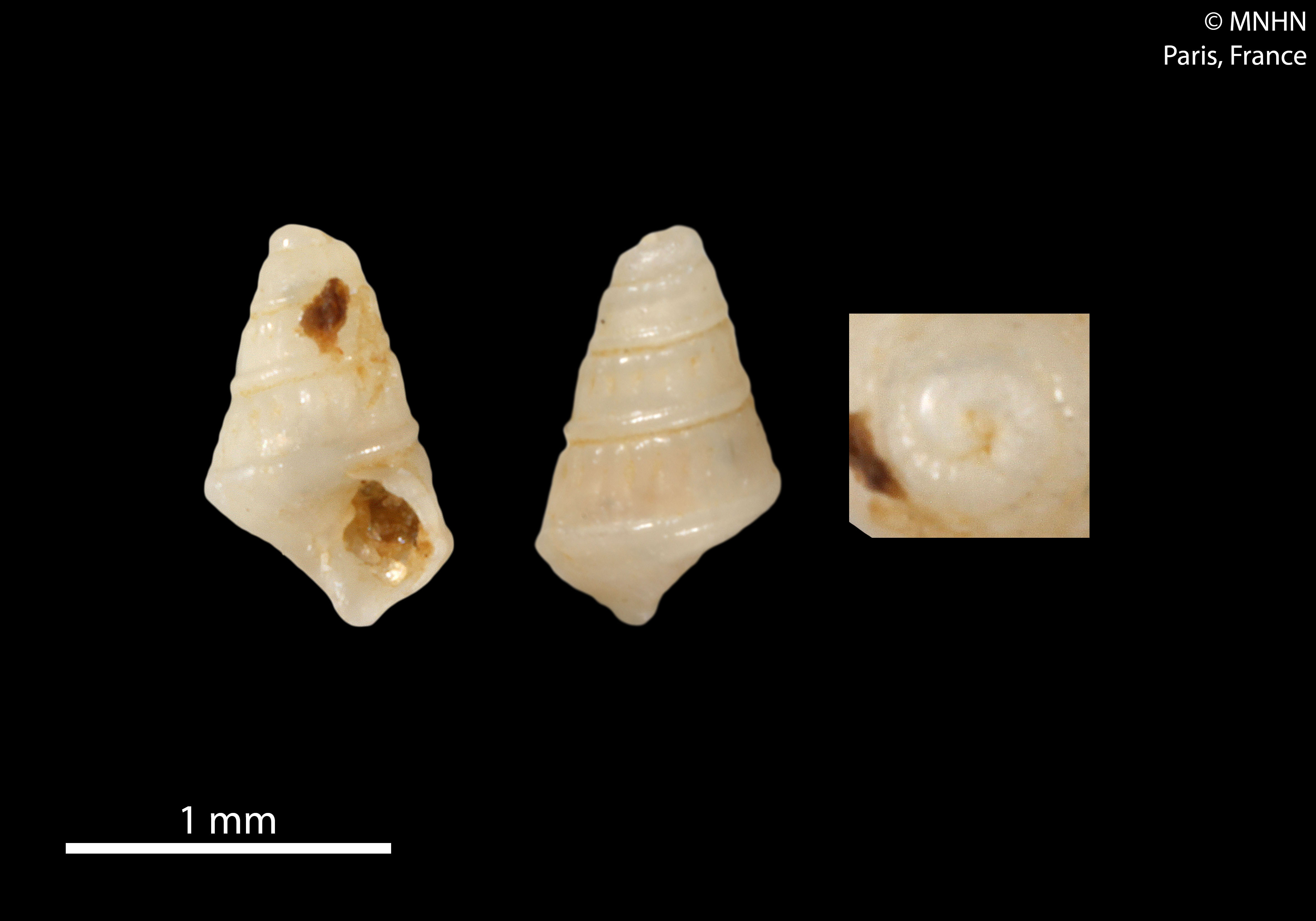

Scientific classification
- Kingdom: Animalia
- Phylum: Mollusca
- Class: Gastropoda
- Family: Pyramidellidae
- Genus: Egila
- Species: E. ektopa

Binomial name
- Egila ektopa Pimenta & Absalão, 2004

= Egila ektopa =

Species of gastropod

Egila ektopa is a species of sea snail, a marine gastropod mollusk in the family Pyramidellidae, the pyrams and their allies.
