= Jordaniella nivosa =

Scientific classification
- Kingdom: Animalia
- Phylum: Mollusca
- Class: Gastropoda
- Family: Pyramidellidae
- Genus: Jordaniella
- Species: J. nivosa

Binomial name
- Jordaniella nivosa (Montagu, 1803)

Synonyms
- Chrysallida nivosa (Montagu, 1803); Odostomia cylindrica Alder, 1844; Odostomia nivosa (Montagu, 1803); Turbo nivosus Montagu, 1803 (original combination)

Species of gastropod

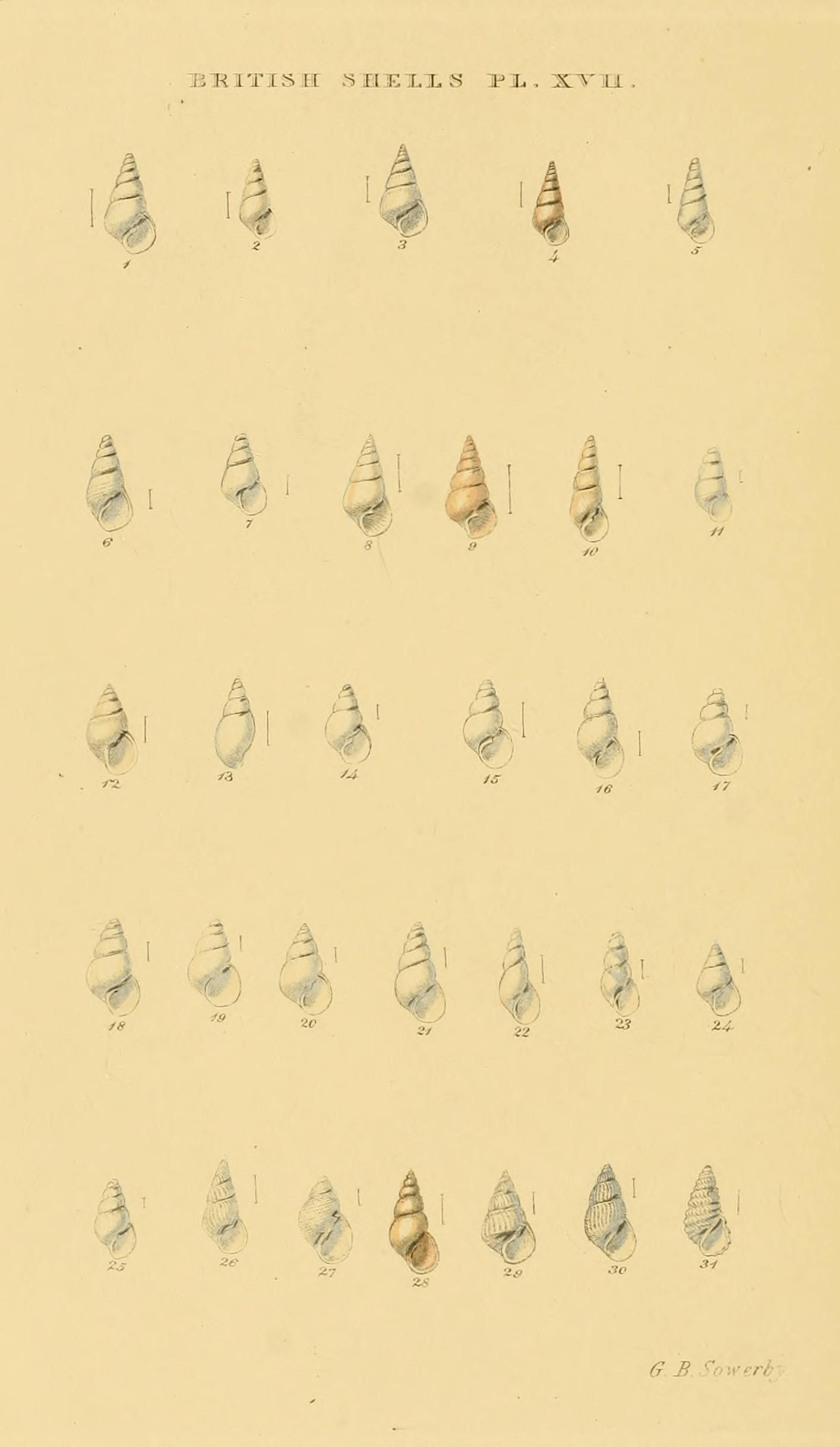
11 Odostomia cylindrica Alder Chrysallida nivosa

Jordaniella nivosa is a species of sea snail, a marine gastropod mollusk in the family Pyramidellidae, the pyrams and their allies.

== Distribution ==
This marine species occurs in the following locations:

- European waters (ERMS scope)
- Irish Exclusive economic Zone
- Portuguese Exclusive Economic Zone
- Spanish Exclusive Economic Zone
- United Kingdom Exclusive Economic Zone
