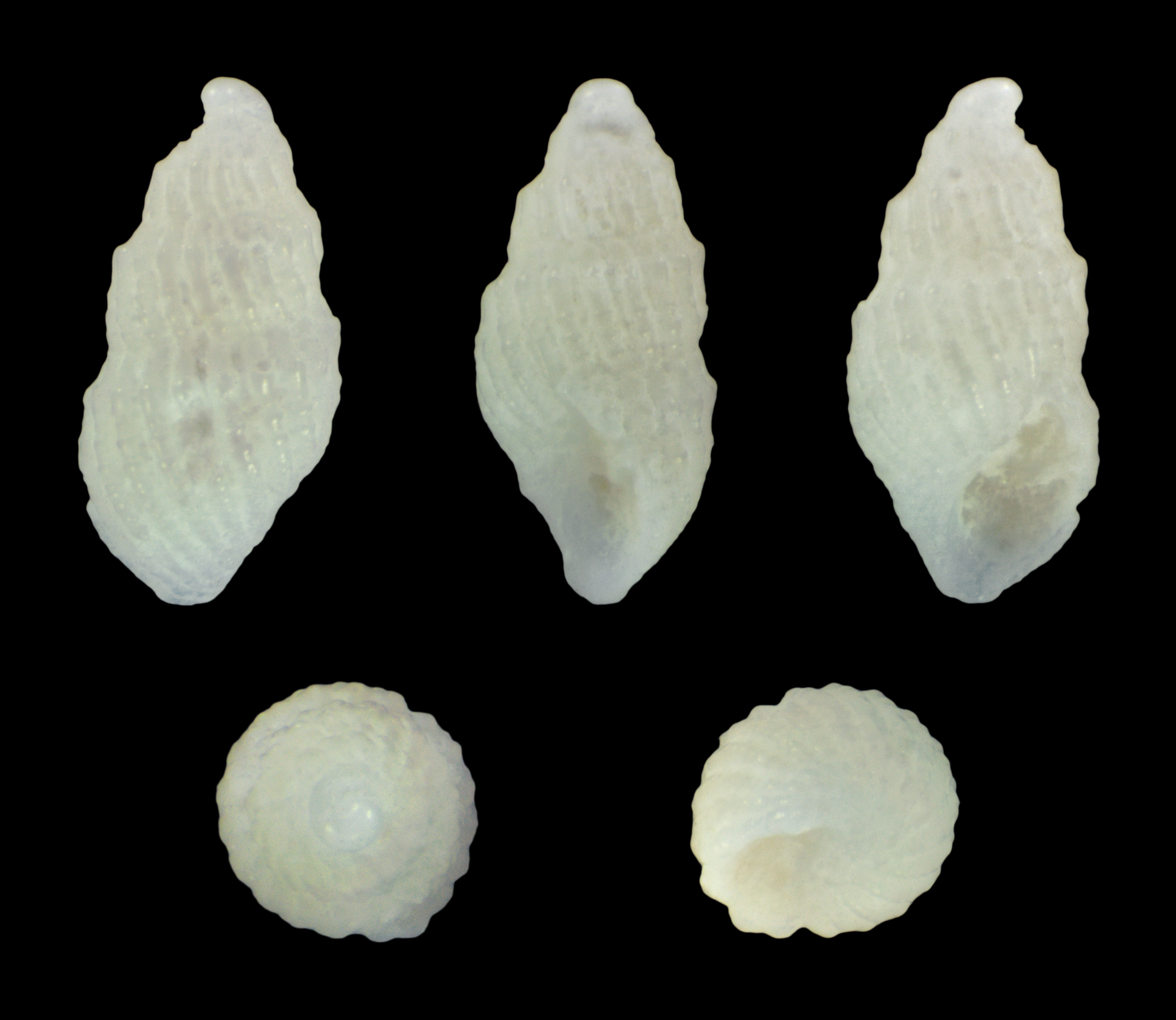
- Polemicella polemica (Melvill, 1910)

Scientific classification
- Kingdom: Animalia
- Phylum: Mollusca
- Class: Gastropoda
- Subcohort: Panpulmonata
- Superfamily: Pyramidelloidea
- Family: Pyramidellidae
- Genus: Polemicella; Schander, van Aartsen & Corgan, 1999

Type species
- Pyrgulina polemica Melvill, 1910

Species
- See text

Synonyms
- Bathymurex Clench & Farfante, 1945; Dallimurex Rehder, 1946; Paziella Jousseaume, 1880

= Polemicella =

Genus of gastropods

Polemicella is a small genus of very small sea snails, pyramidellid gastropod mollusks or micromollusks in the family Odostomiidae.

== Nomenclature ==
The name Polemicella is not available from Saurin (Annales de la Faculté des Sciences de Saïgon, (1959): 242), who did not explicitly designate a type species ("doubtful OD" according to Schander et al.)

== Shell description ==
The original description by Laseron (1959) (in French) states that the genus was introduced for forms of the near Pyrgulina polemica: short shell with graduated, streamlined or angled whorls on the periphery. It is sculpted with axial ribs and with a single spiral on periphery. There is sometimes a spiral towards the summit of the whorls. Pyrgulina mellvilli is also a representative typical of this genus.

== Life history ==
Nothing is known about the biology of the members of this genus. As is true of most members of the Pyramidellidae sensu lato, they are most likely to be ectoparasites.

== Species ==
Species within the genus Polemicella include:

- Polemicella aartseni Robba, Di Geronimo, Chaimanee, Negri & Sanfilippo, 2003
- Polemicella dautzenbergi (Melvill, 1910)
- Polemicella piscatorum Saurin, 1959
- Polemicella polemica (Melvill, 1910) (type species) (as Pyrgulina polemica)
- Polemicella saurini Robba, Di Geronimo, Chaimanee, Negri & Sanfilippo, 2003
