= Siogamaia morioria =

Scientific classification
- Kingdom: Animalia
- Phylum: Mollusca
- Class: Gastropoda
- Family: Pyramidellidae
- Genus: Siogamaia
- Species: S. morioria

Binomial name
- Siogamaia morioria Laws, 1941

Species of gastropod

Siogamaia morioria is a species of sea snail, a marine gastropod mollusk in the family Pyramidellidae, the pyrams and their allies.
