= Liamorpha elegans =

Scientific classification
- Kingdom: Animalia
- Phylum: Mollusca
- Class: Gastropoda
- Superfamily: Pyramidelloidea
- Family: Pyramidellidae
- Genus: Liamorpha
- Species: L. elegans

Binomial name
- Liamorpha elegans (de Folin, 1870)

Synonyms
- Chrysallida elegans (de Folin, 1870); Chrysallida pulchra Gaglini, 1992; Mathilda elegans de Folin, 1870 (original combination); Miralda elegans (de Folin, 1870); Pyrgulina sculptatissima Dautzenberg, 1912

Species of gastropod

Liamorpha elegans is a species of sea snail, a marine gastropod mollusk in the family Pyramidellidae, the pyrams and their allies.

== Distribution ==
This species occurs in the following locations:

- European waters (ERMS scope)
