= Odostomella metata =

Scientific classification
- Kingdom: Animalia
- Phylum: Mollusca
- Class: Gastropoda
- Family: Pyramidellidae
- Genus: Odostomella
- Species: O. metata

Binomial name
- Odostomella metata (Hedley, 1907)

Synonyms
- Odostomia metata Hedley, 1907

Species of gastropod

Odostomella metata is a species of sea snail, a marine gastropod mollusk in the family Pyramidellidae, the pyrams and their allies.

== Distribution ==
This marine species is endemic to New Zealand.
