= Odostomella africana =

Scientific classification
- Kingdom: Animalia
- Phylum: Mollusca
- Class: Gastropoda
- Family: Pyramidellidae
- Genus: Odostomella
- Species: O. africana

Binomial name
- Odostomella africana Schander, 1994

Species of gastropod

Odostomella africana is a species of sea snail, a marine gastropod mollusk in the family Pyramidellidae, the pyrams and their allies.
