= Gumina minor =

Scientific classification
- Kingdom: Animalia
- Phylum: Mollusca
- Class: Gastropoda
- Family: Pyramidellidae
- Genus: Gumina
- Species: G. minor

Binomial name
- Gumina minor Laws, 1940

Species of gastropod

Gumina minor is a species of sea snail, a marine gastropod mollusk in the family Pyramidellidae, the pyrams and their allies.
