= Striodostomia orewa =

Scientific classification
- Kingdom: Animalia
- Phylum: Mollusca
- Class: Gastropoda
- Family: Pyramidellidae
- Genus: Striodostomia
- Species: S. orewa

Binomial name
- Striodostomia orewa Laws, 1940

Species of gastropod

Striodostomia orewa is a species of sea snail, a marine gastropod mollusk in the family Pyramidellidae, the pyrams and their allies.
