= Noemiamea batllori =

Scientific classification
- Kingdom: Animalia
- Phylum: Mollusca
- Class: Gastropoda
- Family: Pyramidellidae
- Genus: Noemiamea
- Species: N. batllori

Binomial name
- Noemiamea batllori Moreno, Peñas & Rolán, 2003

Species of gastropod

Noemiamea batllori is a species of sea snail, a marine gastropod mollusk in the family Pyramidellidae, the pyrams and their allies.
