= Tropaeas subulata =

- Drawing of a shell of Tropaeas subulata

Scientific classification
- Kingdom: Animalia
- Phylum: Mollusca
- Class: Gastropoda
- Family: Pyramidellidae
- Genus: Tropaeas
- Species: T. subulata

Binomial name
- Tropaeas subulata (A. Adams, 1853)

Species of gastropod

Tropaeas subulata is a species of sea snail, a marine gastropod mollusk in the family Pyramidellidae, the pyrams and their allies.

== Description ==
The whitish, somewhat shining shell is smooth and pellucid. The length of the shell is 9.5 mm. Its apex is mucronate. The whorls of the teleoconch are plano-convex, strongly longitudinally costate, and with punctate interstices. The columella is uniplicate in the middle. The aperture is produced and subchanneled below. The shell is umbilicated.

== Distribution ==
This marine species occurs in the Red Sea, off the Philippines and off Japan.
