= Cyclostremella =

Scientific classification
- Kingdom: Animalia
- Phylum: Mollusca
- Class: Gastropoda
- Family: Pyramidellidae
- Tribe: Cyclostremellini
- Genus: Cyclostremella; Bush, 1897

Genus of gastropods

Cyclostremella is a minor genus of sea snails, marine gastropod mollusks in the family Pyramidellidae, the pyrams and their allies.

== Species ==
There are three known species within the genus Cyclostremella, with the exception of one being a synonym, these include the following as listed below:

- Cyclostremella concordia Bartsch, 1920
- Cyclostremella humilis Bush, 1897
- Cyclostremella orbis (Carpenter, 1857)

The following species were brought into synonymy:

- Cyclostremella africana Bartsch, 1915 accepted as Solariella fuscomaculata G.B. Sowerby, 1892
