= Noemiamea dolioliformis =

Scientific classification
- Kingdom: Animalia
- Phylum: Mollusca
- Class: Gastropoda
- Family: Pyramidellidae
- Genus: Noemiamea
- Species: N. dolioliformis

Binomial name
- Noemiamea dolioliformis (Jeffreys, 1848)

Synonyms
- Miralda (Noemiamea) dolioliformis dolioliformis (Jeffreys, 1848)

Species of gastropod

Noemiamea dolioliformis is a species of sea snail, a marine gastropod mollusk in the family Pyramidellidae, the pyrams and their allies.

== Description ==
The shell grows to a length of 2.3 mm.

== Distribution ==
This species occurs in the following locations:

- European waters (ERMS scope) (North Sea)
- Portuguese Exclusive Economic Zone
- Spanish Exclusive Economic Zone
- United Kingdom Exclusive Economic Zone
- the Canaries
- the Mediterranean Sea
