= Ivara terryi =

Scientific classification
- Kingdom: Animalia
- Phylum: Mollusca
- Class: Gastropoda
- Family: Pyramidellidae
- Genus: Ivara
- Species: I. terryi

Binomial name
- Ivara terryi (Olsson & McGinty, 1958)

Synonyms
- Chrysallida terryi (Olsson & McGinty, 1958); Miralda terryi (Olsson & McGinty, 1958); Odostomia terryi Olsson & McGinty, 1958 (original combination)

Species of gastropod

Ivara terryi is a species of sea snail, a marine gastropod mollusk in the family Pyramidellidae, the pyrams and their allies.

== Description ==
The species I. terryi is characterised by the specific features of its shell. It should be distinguished from I. terricula, a separate species within the genus Ivara. The original morphological description was made by Olson & McGinty in 1958.

The length of the shell attains 3.2 mm.

== Distribution ==
This marine species occurs in the following locations:

- Caribbean Sea
- Colombia
- Gulf of Mexico
- Mexico
- Panama
