= Odostomella patricia =

Scientific classification
- Kingdom: Animalia
- Phylum: Mollusca
- Class: Gastropoda
- Family: Pyramidellidae
- Genus: Odostomella
- Species: O. patricia

Binomial name
- Odostomella patricia (Pilsbry, 1918)

Synonyms
- Herviera patricia (Pilsbry, 1918); Odostomia (Odostomella) patricia Pilsbry, 1918; Odostomia patricia Pilsbry, 1918

Species of gastropod

Odostomella patricia is a species of sea snail, a marine gastropod mollusk in the family Pyramidellidae, the pyrams and their allies.

The length of the shell attains 2 mm. This species occurs in the Indian Ocean off Réunion.
