= Tropaeas castanea =

Scientific classification
- Kingdom: Animalia
- Phylum: Mollusca
- Class: Gastropoda
- Family: Pyramidellidae
- Genus: Tropaeas
- Species: T. castanea

Binomial name
- Tropaeas castanea (A. Adams, 1863)

Synonyms
- Tropaeas castaneus [sic] (misspelling)

Species of gastropod

Tropaeas castanea is a species of sea snail, a marine gastropod mollusk in the family Pyramidellidae, the pyrams and their allies.
