= Liamorpha decorata =

Scientific classification
- Kingdom: Animalia
- Phylum: Mollusca
- Class: Gastropoda
- Superfamily: Pyramidelloidea
- Family: Pyramidellidae
- Genus: Liamorpha
- Species: L. decorata

Binomial name
- Liamorpha decorata (de Folin, 1873)

Synonyms
- Lia decorata de Folin, 1873 (original combination); Pseudoscilla decorata (de Folin, 1873)

Species of gastropod

Liamorpha decorata is a species of sea snail, a marine gastropod mollusk in the family Pyramidellidae, the pyrams and their allies.

== Description ==
The shell has an oval conic shape. The whorls of the teleoconch are decussated. The lip is undulated by the spiral sculpture which appears on the columella, simulating two plications.

== Distribution ==
This marine species occurs in the following locations:

- Gulf of Mexico : Texas, Mexico, Guadeloupe.
