= Salassia bicarinata =

Scientific classification
- Kingdom: Animalia
- Phylum: Mollusca
- Class: Gastropoda
- Family: Pyramidellidae
- Genus: Salassia
- Species: S. bicarinata

Binomial name
- Salassia bicarinata Robba, Di Geronimo, Chaimanee, Negri & Sanfilippo, 2004

Synonyms
- Odostomia (Salassia) bicarinata (Robba, Di Geronimo, Chaimanee, Negri & Sanfilippo, 2003)

Species of gastropod

Salassia bicarinata is a species of sea snail, a marine gastropod mollusk in the family Pyramidellidae, the pyrams and their allies.

== Distribution ==
This marine species occurs in the Gulf of Thailand.
