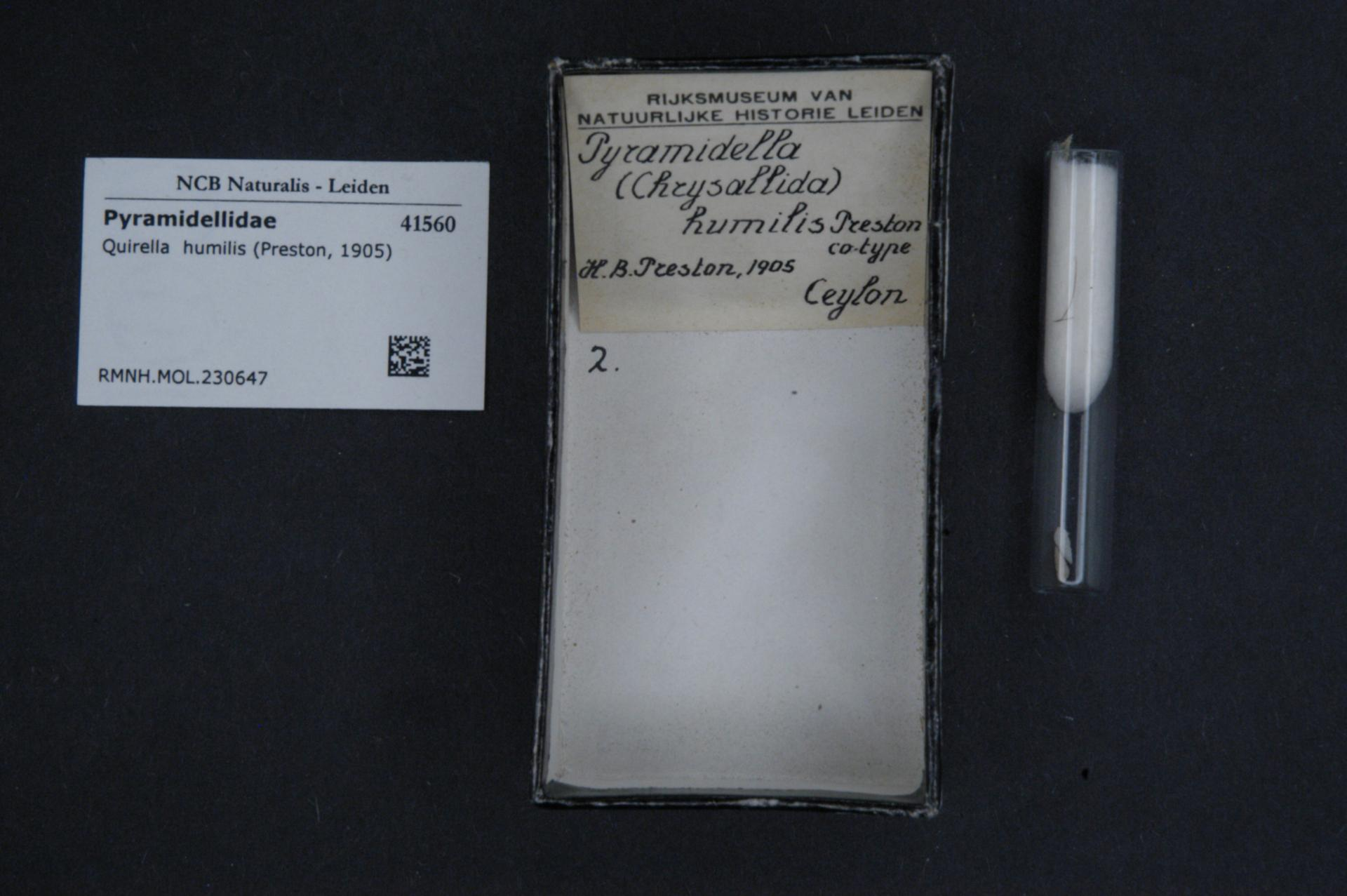
- Quirella humilis

Scientific classification
- Kingdom: Animalia
- Phylum: Mollusca
- Class: Gastropoda
- Family: Pyramidellidae
- Genus: Quirella
- Species: Q. humilis

Binomial name
- Quirella humilis (Preston, 1905)

Synonyms
- Chrysallida humilis (Preston, 1905); Pyramidella humilis Preston, 1905

= Quirella humilis =

Species of gastropod

Quirella humilis is a species of sea snail, a marine gastropod mollusk in the family Pyramidellidae, the pyrams and their allies.
