= Eulimastoma didymum =

Scientific classification
- Kingdom: Animalia
- Phylum: Mollusca
- Class: Gastropoda
- Family: Pyramidellidae
- Genus: Eulimastoma
- Species: E. didymum

Binomial name
- Eulimastoma didymum (Verrill & Bush, 1900)

Species of gastropod

Eulimastoma didymum is a species of sea snail, a marine gastropod mollusk in the family Pyramidellidae, the pyrams and their allies.

== Distribution ==
This species occurs in the following locations:

- Aruba
- Belize
- Bonaire
- Caribbean Sea
- Cayman Islands
- Colombia
- Curaçao
- Gulf of Mexico
