= Eulimastoma eutropia =

Scientific classification
- Kingdom: Animalia
- Phylum: Mollusca
- Class: Gastropoda
- Family: Pyramidellidae
- Genus: Eulimastoma
- Species: E. eutropia

Binomial name
- Eulimastoma eutropia (Melvill, 1899)

Synonyms
- Odostomia eutropia Melvill, 1899

Species of sea snail

Eulimastoma eutropia is a species of sea snail, a marine gastropod mollusk in the family Pyramidellidae, the pyrams and their allies.

== Description ==
The shell is composed of polished rounded whorls that slope with the structures length. The length of the shell varies between 2 mm and 5 mm.

== Distribution ==
This marine species occurs of Southeast Asia and the Philippines.
