= Bartrumella =

Scientific classification
- Domain: Eukaryota
- Kingdom: Animalia
- Phylum: Mollusca
- Class: Gastropoda
- Family: Pyramidellidae
- Tribe: Chrysallidini
- Genus: Bartrumella; Laws, 1940

Species
- See text.

Genus of gastropods

Bartrumella is a small genus of miniature sea snails, pyramidellid gastropod mollusks or micromollusks in the family Pyramidellidae within the tribe Chrysallidini (sensu taxonomy by Bouchet & Roctroi, 2005).

== Etymology ==
The genus is named after Professor and Mrs. John Arthur Bartrum (1885–1949), of Takapuna, Auckland.

== Shell description ==
The shell of Bartrumella is high spired with a well-developed columellar lamella, which gives the appearance of a tooth in the aperture.

There are axial ribs and fine spiral sculpture in the form of raised intercostal threads which are only visible through a hand lens or microscope. The spiral sculpture is present on all whorls and on the base. This sculpture is stronger towards the apical side of the whorls, and in that area there are nodules where the spiral and axial sculpture cross. The axial sculpture evanesces gradually on the base. The protoconch is intorted (planorboid).

The original description of the genus and type species can be found at: and at

== Distribution ==
The genus has so far only been recorded from New Zealand and other surrounding minor islands and land masses.

== Life history ==
Very little is known about the biology of the members of this genus. As is true of most members of the Pyramidellidae sensu lato, they are most likely to be ectoparasites.

== Species ==
Species within the genus Bartrumella include:

- Bartrumella kaawaensis Laws, 1940 - type species
- Bartrumella waitakereensis
