= Sinuatodostomia nomurai =

Scientific classification
- Kingdom: Animalia
- Phylum: Mollusca
- Class: Gastropoda
- Family: Pyramidellidae
- Genus: Sinuatodostomia
- Species: S. nomurai

Binomial name
- Sinuatodostomia nomurai van Aartsen & Corgan, 1996

Synonyms
- Odostomia sinuosa Nomura, 1937

Species of gastropod

Sinuatodostomia nomurai is a species of sea snail, a marine gastropod mollusk in the family Pyramidellidae, the pyrams and their allies.
