= Quirella mirationis =

Scientific classification
- Kingdom: Animalia
- Phylum: Mollusca
- Class: Gastropoda
- Family: Pyramidellidae
- Genus: Quirella
- Species: Q. mirationis

Binomial name
- Quirella mirationis Laseron, 1959

Species of gastropod

Quirella mirationis is a species of sea snail, a marine gastropod mollusk in the family Pyramidellidae, the pyrams and their allies.
