= Gumina dolichostoma =

Scientific classification
- Kingdom: Animalia
- Phylum: Mollusca
- Class: Gastropoda
- Family: Pyramidellidae
- Genus: Gumina
- Species: G. dolichostoma

Binomial name
- Gumina dolichostoma (Suter, 1908)

Synonyms
- Odostomia dolichostoma Suter, 1908

Species of gastropod

Gumina dolichostoma is a species of sea snail, a marine gastropod mollusk in the family Pyramidellidae, the pyrams and their allies.
