= Tropaeas livida =

Scientific classification
- Kingdom: Animalia
- Phylum: Mollusca
- Class: Gastropoda
- Family: Pyramidellidae
- Genus: Tropaeas
- Species: T. livida

Binomial name
- Tropaeas livida (Sowerby III, 1901)

Synonyms
- Elusa livida Sowerby, 1901; Herviera isidella Melvill & Standen, 1899

Species of gastropod

Tropaeas livida is a species of sea snail, a marine gastropod mollusk in the family Pyramidellidae, the pyrams and their allies.

== Distribution ==
This marine species occurs off the Philippines.
