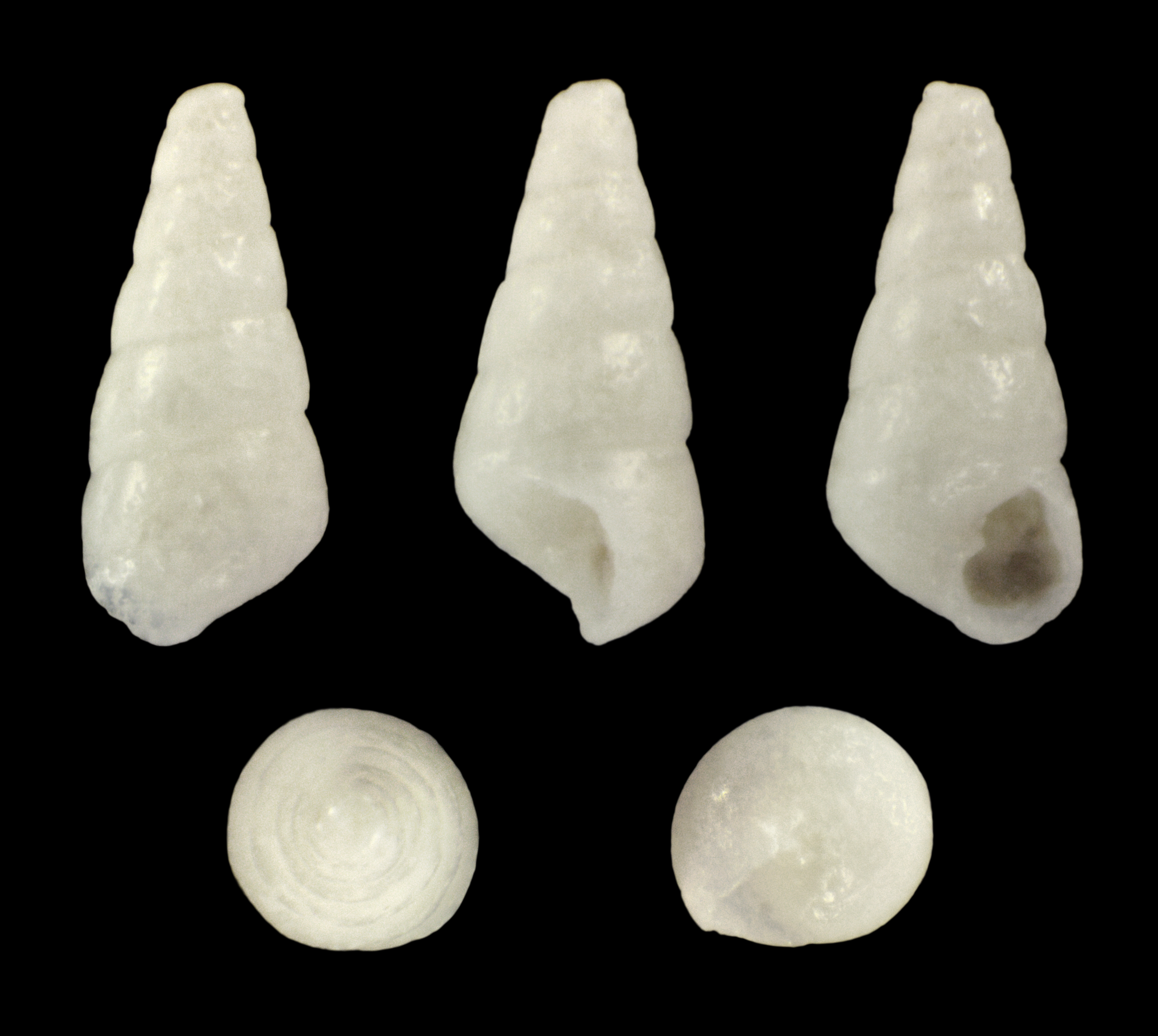

Scientific classification
- Kingdom: Animalia
- Phylum: Mollusca
- Class: Gastropoda
- Family: Pyramidellidae
- Genus: Eulimastoma
- Species: E. canaliculatum

Binomial name
- Eulimastoma canaliculatum (C. B. Adams, 1850)

= Eulimastoma canaliculatum =

Species of gastropod

Eulimastoma canaliculatum is a species of sea snail, a marine gastropod mollusk in the family Pyramidellidae, the pyrams and their allies.

== Distribution ==
This species occurs in the following locations:

- Aruba
- Bonaire
- Caribbean Sea
- Colombia
- Curaçao
- Gulf of Mexico
- Jamaica
- Mexico
- Puerto Rico
