= Odostomella bicincta =

Scientific classification
- Kingdom: Animalia
- Phylum: Mollusca
- Class: Gastropoda
- Family: Pyramidellidae
- Genus: Odostomella
- Species: O. bicincta

Binomial name
- Odostomella bicincta (Tiberi, 1868)

Species of gastropod

Odostomella bicincta is a species of sea snail, a marine gastropod mollusk in the family Pyramidellidae, the pyrams and their allies.

== Distribution ==
This species occurs in the following locations:

- Canary Islands
- Cape Verde
- Mediterranean Sea
