= Bartrumella kaawaensis =

Scientific classification
- Kingdom: Animalia
- Phylum: Mollusca
- Class: Gastropoda
- Family: Pyramidellidae
- Genus: Bartrumella
- Species: B. kaawaensis

Binomial name
- Bartrumella kaawaensis Laws, 1940

Synonyms
- Bartrumella kaawaensis

Species of gastropod

Bartrumella kaawaensis is a species of sea snail, a marine gastropod mollusk in the family Pyramidellidae, the pyrams and their allies. It is the type species of the genus Bartrumella.
