= Cyclostremella orbis =

Scientific classification
- Kingdom: Animalia
- Phylum: Mollusca
- Class: Gastropoda
- Family: Pyramidellidae
- Genus: Cyclostremella
- Species: C. orbis

Binomial name
- Cyclostremella orbis (Carpenter, 1857)

Species of gastropod

Cyclostremella orbis is a species of sea snail, a marine gastropod mollusk in the family Pyramidellidae, the pyrams and their allies. The species is one of three known species to exist within the genus Cyclostremella. The other species are Cyclostremella concordia and Cyclostremella humilis.
