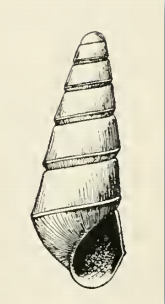
- Apertural view of a shell of Odostomia dotella

Scientific classification
- Kingdom: Animalia
- Phylum: Mollusca
- Class: Gastropoda
- Family: Pyramidellidae
- Genus: Eulimastoma
- Species: E. dotella

Binomial name
- Eulimastoma dotella Dall & Bartsch, 1909

Synonyms
- Odostomia (Eulimastoma) dotella Dall & Bartsch, 1909; Odostomia (Scalenostoma) dotella Dall & Bartsch, 1909 (basionym)

= Eulimastoma dotella =

Species of gastropod

Eulimastoma dotella is a species of sea snail, a marine gastropod mollusc in the family Pyramidellidae, the pyrams and their allies.

== Description ==
The elongate-conic shell is vitreous and translucent. Its length measures 2.3 mm. The whorls of the protoconch are deeply obliquely immersed in the first of the succeeding turns, above which only the tilted edge of the last volution projects. The six whorls of the teleoconch are flattened, very strongly angulated at the periphery where they are much wider than at the appressed summit. The summit of the succeeding turns falls very much anterior to the angulated periphery and gives to the whorls a decided overhanging appearance. The base of the shell is well rounded. The entire surface of the spire and the base are marked by numerous, almost vertical lines of growth and many exceedingly fine spiral striations. The aperture is broadly ovate. The posterior angle is acute. The outer lip is thin and angulated at the periphery. The columella is slender, very strongly curved and slightly revolute.

== Distribution ==
This species occurs in the Gulf of California.
