= Obexomia denselirata =

Scientific classification
- Kingdom: Animalia
- Phylum: Mollusca
- Class: Gastropoda
- Family: Pyramidellidae
- Genus: Obexomia
- Species: O. denselirata

Binomial name
- Obexomia denselirata (Suter, 1908)

Synonyms
- Odostomia denselirata Suter, 1908

Species of gastropod

Obexomia denselirata is a species of sea snail, a marine gastropod mollusk in the family Pyramidellidae, the pyrams and their allies.
