= Odostomella knudseni =

Scientific classification
- Kingdom: Animalia
- Phylum: Mollusca
- Class: Gastropoda
- Family: Pyramidellidae
- Genus: Odostomella
- Species: O. knudseni

Binomial name
- Odostomella knudseni Schander, Hori & Lundberg, 1999

Species of gastropod

Odostomella knudseni is a species of sea snail, a marine gastropod mollusk in the family Pyramidellidae, the pyrams and their allies.
