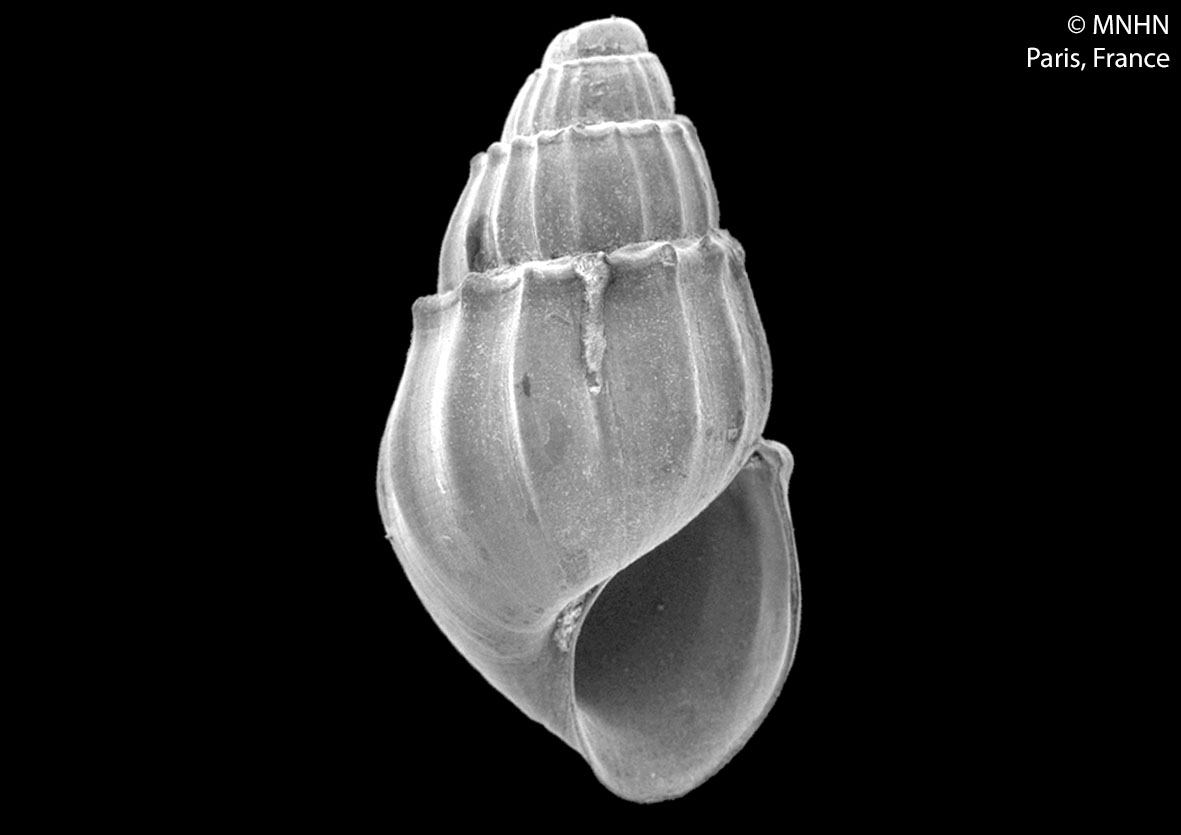
- Shell of Ovalina piriformis (speciemn at MNHN, Paris)

Scientific classification
- Kingdom: Animalia
- Phylum: Mollusca
- Class: Gastropoda
- Subcohort: Panpulmonata
- Superfamily: Pyramidelloidea
- Family: Pyramidellidae
- Genus: Ovalina; Peñas & Rolán, 2017

Type species
- Ovalina piriformis Peñas & Rolán, 2017

= Ovalina =

Genus of gastropods

Ovalina is a genus of minute sea snails, pyramidellid gastropod mollusks or micromollusks in the family Pyramidellidae within the tribe Chrysallidini.

== Species ==
- Ovalina brevisculpta Peñas & Rolán, 2017
- Ovalina circumventa Peñas & Rolán, 2017
- Ovalina corrotata Peñas & Rolán, 2017
- Ovalina delenita Peñas & Rolán, 2017
- Ovalina flexisculpta Peñas & Rolán, 2017
- Ovalina piriformis Peñas & Rolán, 2017
