= Obexomia =

Scientific classification
- Kingdom: Animalia
- Phylum: Mollusca
- Class: Gastropoda
- Family: Pyramidellidae
- Genus: Obexomia; Laws, 1941

Type species
- Odostomia denselirata Suter, 1908

Synonyms
- Obex Laws, 1940

Genus of gastropods

Obexomia is a genus of sea snails, marine gastropod mollusks in the family Pyramidellidae, the pyrams and their allies.

== Species ==
Species within the genus Obexomia include:

- Obexomia denselirata (Suter, 1908)
