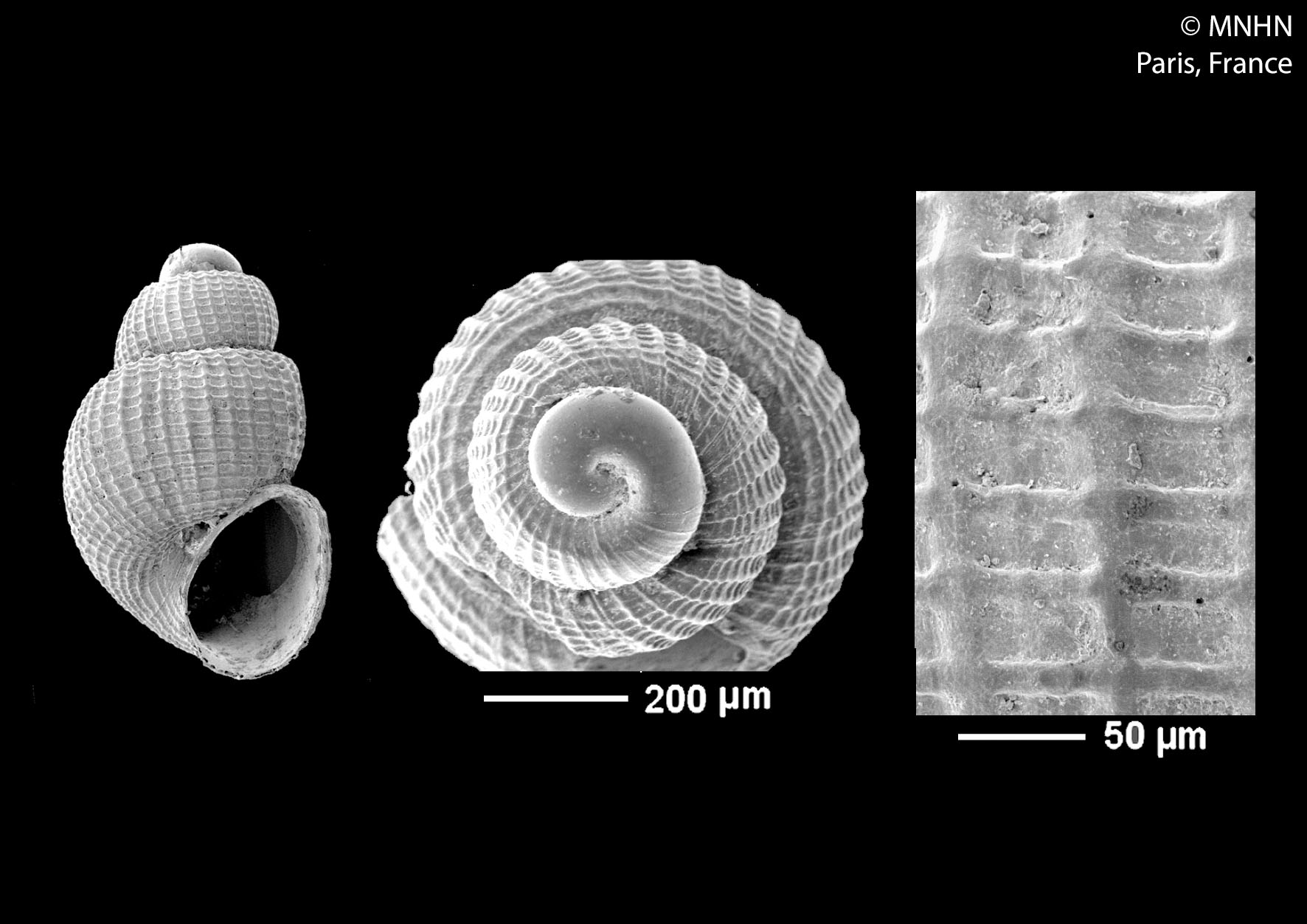
- Shell of Quirella coarguta (holotype at MNHN, Paris)

Scientific classification
- Kingdom: Animalia
- Phylum: Mollusca
- Class: Gastropoda
- Subcohort: Panpulmonata
- Superfamily: Pyramidelloidea
- Family: Pyramidellidae
- Genus: Quirella; Laseron, 1959

Type species
- Quirella mirationis Laseron, 1959

= Quirella =

Genus of gastropods

Quirella is a genus of sea snails, marine gastropod mollusks in the family Pyramidellidae, the pyrams and their allies.

== Species ==
Species within the genus Quirella include:

- Quirella coarguta Peñas & Rolán, 2017
- Quirella disjunctacostae Peñas & Rolán, 2017
- Quirella explicita Peñas & Rolán, 2017
- Quirella fragilis Peñas & Rolán, 2017
- Quirella humilis (Preston, 1905)
- Quirella limitavi Peñas & Rolán, 2017
- Quirella lyngei Robba, Di Geronimo, Chaimanee, Negri & Sanfilippo, 2004
- Quirella mirationis Laseron, 1959
- Quirella mirifica Peñas & Rolán, 2017
- Quirella pabloi Peñas & Rolán, 2017
- Quirella parvireticulata Peñas & Rolán, 2017
- Quirella producta Peñas & Rolán, 2017
- Quirella subattenuata Peñas & Rolán, 2017
- Quirella suprafila Laseron, 1959
- Quirella umbilicostriata Peñas & Rolán, 2017
- Quirella vavauensis Peñas & Rolán, 2017
