= Siogamaia fortiplicata =

Scientific classification
- Kingdom: Animalia
- Phylum: Mollusca
- Class: Gastropoda
- Family: Pyramidellidae
- Genus: Siogamaia
- Species: S. fortiplicata

Binomial name
- Siogamaia fortiplicata (Nomura, 1936)

Synonyms
- Tropaeas fortiplicata Nomura, 1936

Species of gastropod

Siogamaia fortiplicata is a species of sea snail, a marine gastropod mollusk in the family Pyramidellidae, the pyrams and their allies.
