= Striodostomia =

Scientific classification
- Kingdom: Animalia
- Phylum: Mollusca
- Class: Gastropoda
- Family: Pyramidellidae
- Genus: Striodostomia; Laws, 1940

Genus of gastropods

Striodostomia is a genus of sea snails, marine gastropod mollusks in the family Pyramidellidae, the pyrams and their allies.

== Species ==
Species within the genus Striodostomia include:

- Striodostomia orewa Laws, 1940
