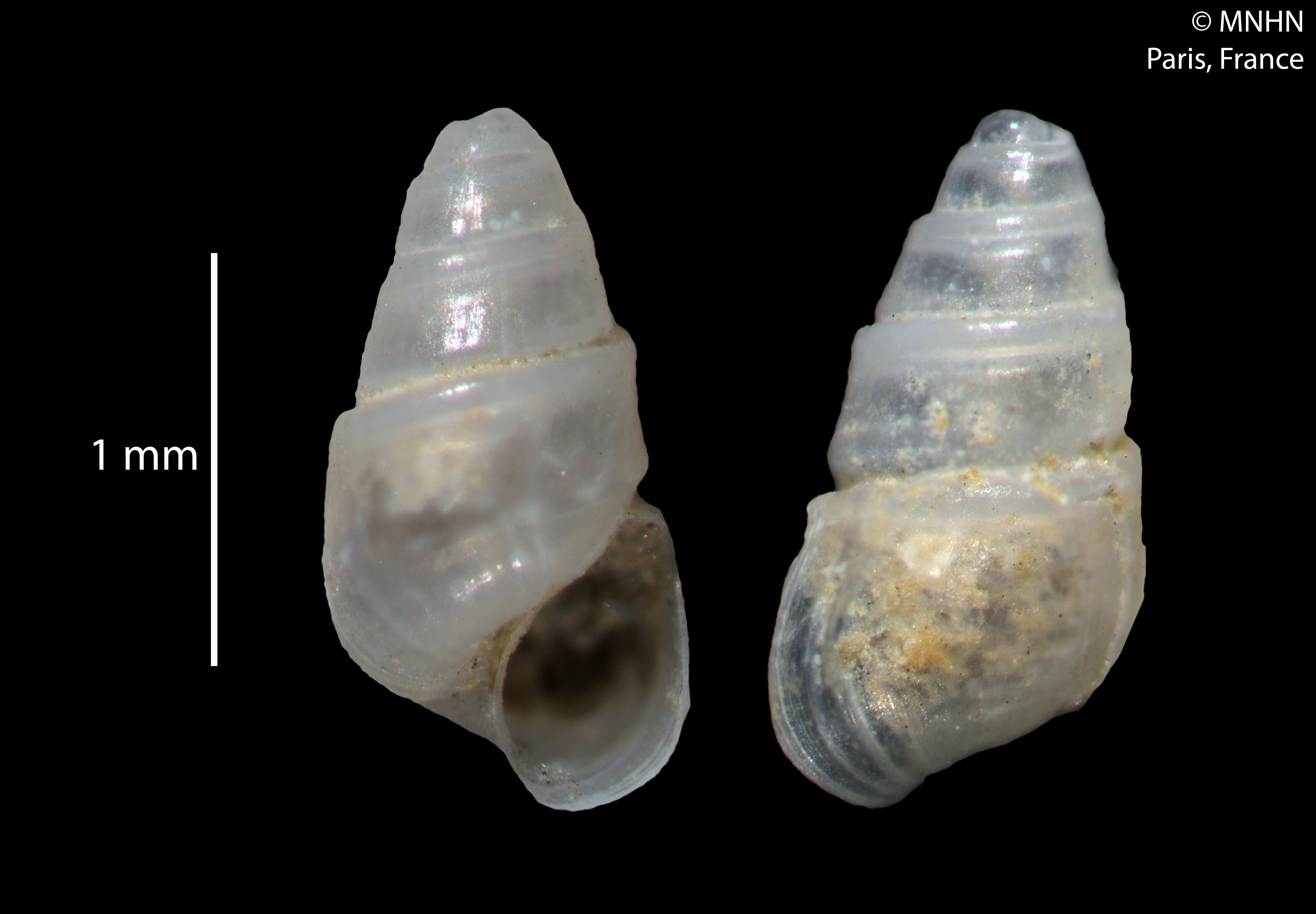
- Shell of Eulimastoma exiguum (paratype at MNHN, Paris)

Scientific classification
- Kingdom: Animalia
- Phylum: Mollusca
- Class: Gastropoda
- Subcohort: Panpulmonata
- Superfamily: Pyramidelloidea
- Family: Pyramidellidae
- Genus: Eulimastoma; Bartsch, 1916

Synonyms
- Odostomia (Eulimastoma) Bartsch, 1904; Telloda Hertlein & A. M. Strong, 1951 (junior objective synonym of Eulimastoma)

= Eulimastoma =

Genus of gastropods

Eulimastoma is a genus of sea snails, marine gastropod mollusks in the family Pyramidellidae, the pyrams and their allies.

== Species ==
Species within the genus Eulimastoma include:

- Eulimastoma canaliculatum (C. B. Adams, 1850)
- Eulimastoma didymum (Verrill & Bush, 1900)
- Eulimastoma dotella (Dall & Bartsch, 1909)
- Eulimastoma engonium (Bush, 1885)
- Eulimastoma eutropia (Melvill, 1899)
- Eulimastoma exiguum Pimenta, 2012
- Eulimastoma franklini Pimenta, 2012
- Eulimastoma harbisonae Bartsch, 1955
- † Eulimastoma pyrgulopsis (Pilsbry & C. W. Johnson, 1917)
- Eulimastoma surinamense Altena, 1975
- Eulimastoma weberi (Morrison, 1965)
