= Sinuatodostomia =

Scientific classification
- Kingdom: Animalia
- Phylum: Mollusca
- Class: Gastropoda
- Family: Pyramidellidae
- Genus: Sinuatodostomia; Nomura, 1937

Genus of gastropods

Sinuatodostomia is a genus of sea snails, marine gastropod mollusks in the family Pyramidellidae, the pyrams and their allies.

== Species ==
Species within the genus Sinuatodostomia include:

- Sinuatodostomia labunensis Robba, Di Geronimo, Chaimanee, Negri & Sanfilippo, 2004
- Sinuatodostomia nomurai van Aartsen & Corgan, 1996
- Sinuatodostomia somsaki Robba, Di Geronimo, Chaimanee, Negri & Sanfilippo, 2004
