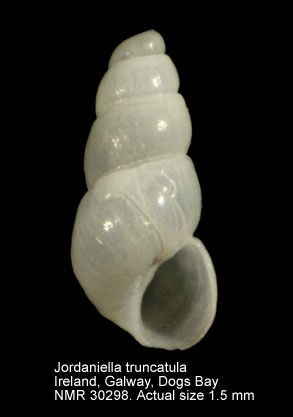

Scientific classification
- Kingdom: Animalia
- Phylum: Mollusca
- Class: Gastropoda
- Family: Pyramidellidae
- Genus: Jordaniella
- Species: J. truncatula

Binomial name
- Jordaniella truncatula (Jeffreys, 1850)

Synonyms
- Chrysallida truncatula (Jeffreys, 1850); Odostomia truncatula Jeffreys, 1850 (original combination)

= Jordaniella truncatula =

Species of gastropod

Jordaniella truncatula is a rare species of sea snail, a marine gastropod mollusk in the family Pyramidellidae, the pyrams and their allies.

== Description ==
The length of the shell varies between 1.5 mm and 4.5 mm.

== Distribution ==
This marine species occurs in the following locations:

- European waters (Greenland, Ireland, Atlantic France)
- United Kingdom Exclusive Economic Zone
- Atlantic Ocean off the Cape Verdes (at depths between 140 m and 200 m)
