= Salassia =

Scientific classification
- Kingdom: Animalia
- Phylum: Mollusca
- Class: Gastropoda
- Family: Pyramidellidae
- Genus: Salassia de Folin, 1870

Genus of gastropods

Salassia is a genus of sea snails, marine gastropod mollusks in the family Pyramidellidae, the pyrams and their allies.

== Species ==
Species within the genus Salassia include:

- Salassia bicarinata Robba, Di Geronimo, Chaimanee, Negri & Sanfilippo, 2004
