= Noemiamea =

Scientific classification
- Kingdom: Animalia
- Phylum: Mollusca
- Class: Gastropoda
- Family: Pyramidellidae
- Genus: Noemiamea de Folin, 1886

Synonyms
- Menestho (Noemiamea) subgenus

Genus of gastropods

Noemiamea is a genus of sea snails, marine gastropod mollusks in the family Pyramidellidae, the pyrams and their allies.

== Species ==
Species within the genus Noemiamea include:

- Noemiamea batllori Moreno, Peñas & Rolán, 2003
- Noemiamea dolioliformis (Jeffreys, 1848)
