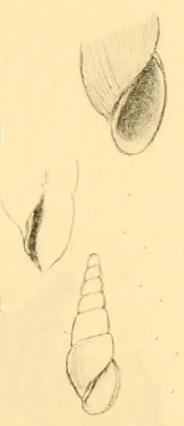
- Shell of Melanella subantarctica (original drawing)

Scientific classification
- Kingdom: Animalia
- Phylum: Mollusca
- Class: Gastropoda
- Subclass: Caenogastropoda
- Order: Littorinimorpha
- Family: Eulimidae
- Genus: Melanella
- Species: M. subantarctica

Binomial name
- Melanella subantarctica (Strebel, 1908)

Synonyms
- Balcis subantarctica (Strebel, 1908); Volutaxiella subantarctica Strebel, 1908 (original combination)

= Melanella subantarctica =

Species of gastropod

Melanella subantarctica is a species of sea snail, a marine gastropod mollusk in the family Pyramidellidae, the pyrams and their allies.

== Description ==
The length of the shell attains 4 mm, its diameter 1.3 mm.

(Original description in German) The shell is slenderly drawn out, glossy, and fairly translucent, with a light horn colour. It bears just over seven whorls, which are only very slightly convex. It could not be demonstrated with certainty whether the apex is also bent downwards. The aperture and the spindle-shaped (fusiform) area behave similarly to those in the preceding species, except that the spindle-shaped area is somewhat less twisted and the transition to the still more deeply deflected basal margin is slightly more obtuse-angled; the outer lip is somewhat produced in the middle. The sculpture is the same. Whether an operculum is present, and of what kind, could not be demonstrated in either of the two examined species.

== Distribution ==
This species occurs in subantarctic waters: South Georgia and the South Sandwich Islands, French Southern Territories and Chile.
