= Gumina =

Scientific classification
- Kingdom: Animalia
- Phylum: Mollusca
- Class: Gastropoda
- Family: Pyramidellidae
- Genus: Gumina; Finlay, 1928

Type species
- Odostomia dolichostoma Suter, 1908

Genus of gastropods

Gumina is a genus of sea snails, marine gastropod mollusks in the family Pyramidellidae, the pyrams and their allies.

== Species ==
Species within the genus Gumina include:

- Gumina dolichostoma (Suter, 1908)
- Gumina minor Laws, 1940
