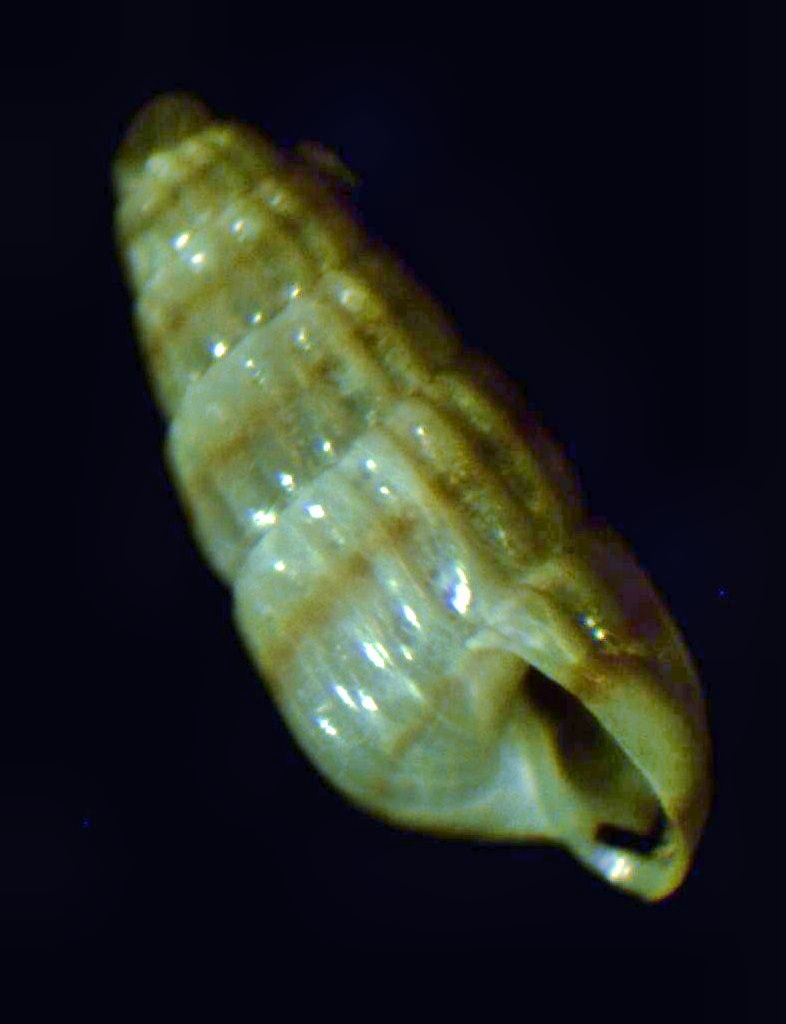
- A shell of Odostomella doliolum

Scientific classification
- Kingdom: Animalia
- Phylum: Mollusca
- Class: Gastropoda
- Family: Pyramidellidae
- Genus: Odostomella
- Species: O. doliolum

Binomial name
- Odostomella doliolum (Philippi, 1844)

Synonyms
- Chrysallida doliolum (Philippi, 1844); Chrysallida tricincta (Jeffreys, 1856); Odostomia tricincta Jeffreys, 1856; Parthenina bucquoyi Locard, 1886; Rissoa bucquoyi [sic] (lapsus for Rissoa doliolum); Rissoa doliolum Philippi, 1844 (original combination)

= Odostomella doliolum =

Species of gastropod

Odostomella doliolum is a species of small sea snail, a marine gastropod mollusc within the family Pyramidellidae, the pyrams and their allies.

== Description ==
The maximum recorded shell length is 2.2 mm.

== Habitat ==
The minimum recorded depth for this species is 33 m. The maximum recorded depth is 101 m.

== Distribution ==
The species occurs in the following locations:

- Mediterranean Sea
- Atlantic Ocean off Cape Verde, Madeira and the Canary Islands.
