= Pseudoskenella depressa =

Scientific classification
- Kingdom: Animalia
- Phylum: Mollusca
- Class: Gastropoda
- Family: Pyramidellidae
- Genus: Pseudoskenella
- Species: P. depressa

Binomial name
- Pseudoskenella depressa Ponder, 1973

Species of gastropod

Pseudoskenella depressa is a species of sea snail, a marine gastropod mollusk in the family Pyramidellidae, the pyrams and their allies.

== Description ==
The shell grows to a length of 1.1 mm and a height of 1.5 mm. It feeds on the tube worm Galeolaria caespitosa

== Distribution ==
This marine species occurs subtidally and offshore off Tasmania, and Eastern Australia (Queensland, New South Wales and Victoria)
