= Cyclostremella humilis =

Scientific classification
- Kingdom: Animalia
- Phylum: Mollusca
- Class: Gastropoda
- Family: Pyramidellidae
- Genus: Cyclostremella
- Species: C. humilis

Binomial name
- Cyclostremella humilis Bush, 1897

Species of gastropod

Cyclostremella humilis is a species of sea snail, a marine gastropod mollusk in the family Pyramidellidae, the pyrams and their allies. The species is one of three known species to exist within the genus, Cyclostremella. The other species being Cyclostremella concordia and Cyclostremella orbis.

== Distribution ==
This species occurs in the following locations:

- Gulf of Mexico
