= Cyclostremella concordia =

Scientific classification
- Kingdom: Animalia
- Phylum: Mollusca
- Class: Gastropoda
- Family: Pyramidellidae
- Genus: Cyclostremella
- Species: C. concordia

Binomial name
- Cyclostremella concordia Bartsch, 1920

Species of gastropod

Cyclostremella concordia is a species of sea snail, a marine gastropod mollusk in the family Pyramidellidae, the pyrams and their allies. The species is one of three known species to exist within the genus, Cyclostremella. The other species being Cyclostremella humilis and Cyclostremella orbis.
