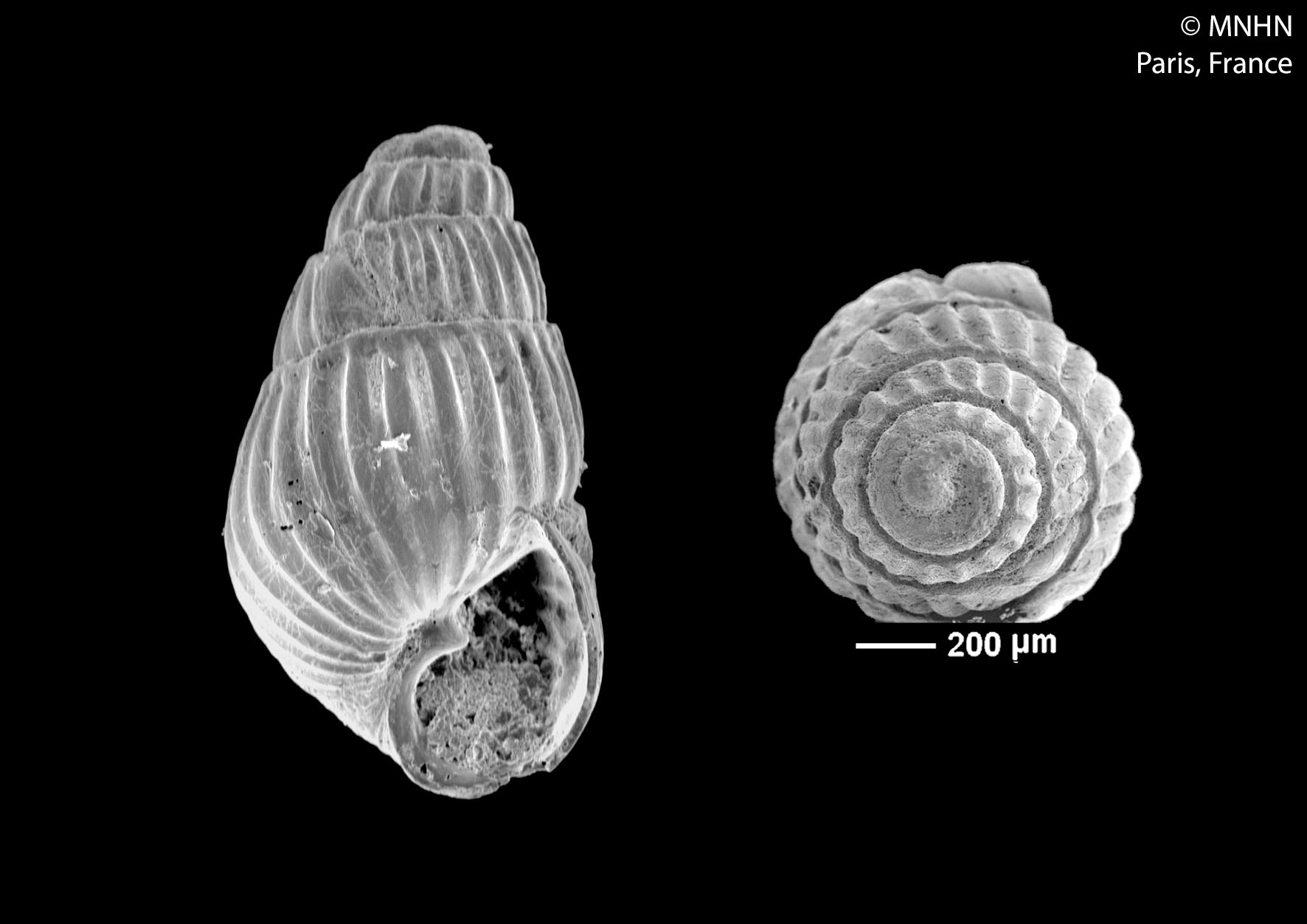
- Shell of Helodiamea attracta (holotype at MNHN, Paris)

Scientific classification
- Kingdom: Animalia
- Phylum: Mollusca
- Class: Gastropoda
- Subcohort: Panpulmonata
- Superfamily: Pyramidelloidea
- Family: Pyramidellidae
- Genus: Helodiamea; Peñas & Rolán, 2017

= Helodiamea =

Genus of sea snails

Helodiamea is a genus of minute sea snails, marine gastropod mollusks or micromollusks in the family Pyramidellidae, the pyrams and their allies.

== Species ==
Species within the genus Helodiamea include:

- Helodiamea attracta Peñas & Rolán, 2017
- Helodiamea circumfimbria Peñas & Rolán, 2017
- Helodiamea conglobationis Peñas & Rolán, 2017
- Helodiamea creta Peñas & Rolán, 2017
- Helodiamea elevataspira Peñas & Rolán, 2017
- Helodiamea fijiensis Peñas & Rolán, 2017
- Helodiamea firma Peñas, Rolán & Sabelli, 2020
- Helodiamea gisna (Dall & Bartsch, 1904)
- Helodiamea martinezae Peñas & Rolán, 2017
- Helodiamea prima Peñas, Rolán & Sabelli, 2020
- Helodiamea valdesi Peñas & Rolán, 2017
