= Odostomiinae =

- Odostomia pallida, O. conoidea, O. conspicua, O. truncatula

Scientific classification
- Kingdom: Animalia
- Phylum: Mollusca
- Class: Gastropoda
- Subcohort: Panpulmonata
- Superfamily: Pyramidelloidea
- Family: Pyramidellidae
- Subfamily: Odostomiinae; P. Pelseneer, 1928

Synonyms
- synonyms of Odostomiini: Ptychostomonidae Locard, 1886; Liostomiini Schander, Halanych, Dahlgren & Sundberg, 2003 (n.a.)

Subfamily of gastropods

Odostomiinae, Odostomia snails and their allies, is a taxonomic subfamily of minute parasitic sea snails. These are marine heterobranch gastropod mollusks, or micromollusks, in the family Pyramidellidae.

== Taxonomy ==
The subfamily Odostomiinae has been recognized as monophyletic.

It includes the tribe Liostomini, a name given to those genera which have an intorted protoconch. The rest of the genera however do not form a single monophyletic taxon.

Subfamily Odostomiinae has been classified as one of eleven recognised subfamilies of the very voluminous gastropod family Pyramidellidae (according to the taxonomy of Ponder & Lindberg 1997): Odostomiinae, Turbonillinae, Chrysallidinae, Cingulininae, Cyclostremellinae, Sayellinae, Syrnolinae, Eulimellinae, Pyramidellinae, Odostomellinae and Tiberiinae.

In the taxonomy of Bouchet & Rocroi (2005), this subfamily also comprises the subfamilies Chrysallidinae, Cyclostremellinae and Odostomellinae, that they have downgraded to the rank of tribe.

subfamily Odostomiinae Pelseneer, 1928

- tribe Odostomiini Pelseneer, 1928
- tribe Chrysallidini Saurin, 1958 - formerly subfamily Chrysallidinae
- tribe Cyclostremellini D.R. Moore, 1966 - formerly subfamily Cyclostremellinae
- tribe Odostomellini Saurin, 1959 - formerly subfamily Odostomellinae

According to Schander, Van Aartsen and Corgan (1999) there are 33 genera in Odostominae with four possible additional genera of uncertain status.

== Genera ==
Genera in the subfamily Odostomiinae include:

tribe Odostomiini

- Odostomia Fleming, 1813 - type genus
- Aartsenia Warén, 1991
- Auristomia Monterosato, 1884
- Boonea
- Brachystomia Monterosato, 1884
- Colpostomia Cossmann, 1921
- Creanatodostomia Nomura, 1937
- Cyclodostomia Sacco, 1892
- Doliella Monterosato, 1880
- Eulimastoma Bartsch, 1916
- Eustomia Cossmann, 1921
- Evalea A. Adams, 1860
- Gumina Finlay, 1928
- Heida Dall, 1903
- Jordaniella Chaster, 1898
- Kunopia Laseron, 1959
- Liostomia G. O. Sars, 1878
- Macrodostomia Sacco, 1892
- Marginodostomia Nomura, 1936possible synonyme of Cyclodostomia fide Saurin (1958:64)
- Megastomia Monterosato, 1884
- Nesiodostomia Pilsbry, 1918
- Nisostomia Cossmann, 1921
- Noemiamea De Folin in Hoyle, 1886- have been shown to be a part of Odostomia sensu stricta by Schander and co-workers (2003)
- Obexomia Laws, 1941
- Odetta De Folin, 1870
- Ondina De Folin, 1870
- Pyramistomia Cossmann, 1921
- Sinuatodostomia Nomura, 1937
- Sinustomia Cossmann, 1921
- Striodostomia Laws, 1940
- Turridostomia Habe, 1961
- Villia Dall, & Bartsch, 1904
- Volutaxiella Strebel, 1908

tribe Chrysallidini

tribe Cyclostremellini

tribe Odostomellini

== Additional genera ==
Some additional genera which may belong in the subfamily Odostomiinae are:

- Angustispira Pelseneer, 1912
- Helodiamea Peñas & Rolán, 2017
- Myxa Hedley, 1903
- Pseudorissoina Tate & May, 1900
- Ugartea Bartsch, 1917

== Distribution ==
This family is found worldwide, from the tropics to the poles.

== Shell description ==
The shell of these snails has a blunt, heterostrophic protoconch, which is often pointed sideways or wrapped up. Most species in the subfamily have shells which are smaller than 13 mm. The texture of these shells is most often smooth but sometimes sculptured in various forms such as ribs and spirals. Their color is mostly white, cream or yellowish, sometimes with red or brown lines. The teleoconch is dextrally coiled, but the larval shells are sinistral. This results in a sinistrally coiled protoconch. The columella has usually one, but sometimes several, spiral folds. The aperture is closed by an operculum.

== Life habits ==
The Odostomiinae are ectoparasites, feeding mainly on other molluscs and on annelid worms, but some are known to feed on peanut worms and crustaceans.

They do not have a radula. Instead their long proboscis is used to pierce the skin of its prey and suck up its fluids and soft tissues. The eyes on the grooved tentacles are situated toward the base of the tentacles. Between the head and the foot, a lobed process called the mentum ( = thin projection) is visible. These molluscs are hermaphrodites.
