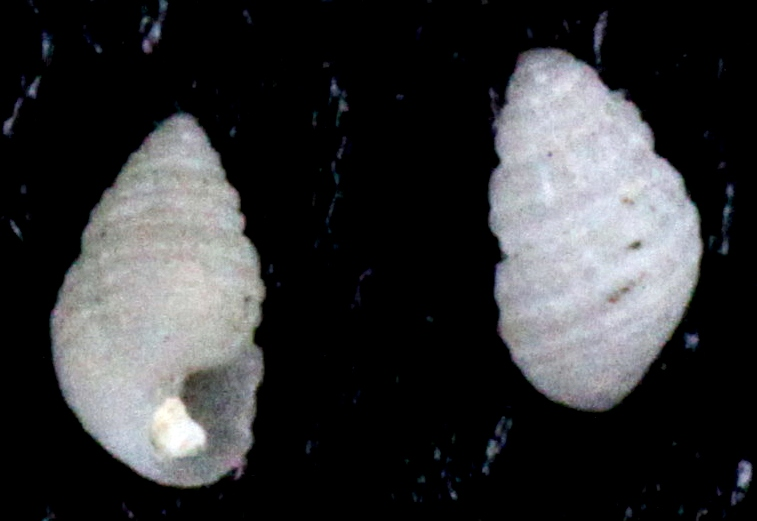
- Miralda diadema

Scientific classification
- Kingdom: Animalia
- Phylum: Mollusca
- Class: Gastropoda
- Family: Pyramidellidae
- Subfamily: Odostomiinae
- Tribe: Chrysallidini
- Genus: Miralda; A. Adams, 1864

Type species
- Parthenia diadema A. Adams, 1860

Synonyms
- Odostomia (Miralda) A. Adams, 1863

= Miralda =

Genus of gastropods

Miralda is a genus of sea snails, marine gastropod mollusks in the family Pyramidellidae, the pyrams, and their allies.

== Species ==
Species within the genus Miralda include:

- Miralda agana Bartsch, 1915
- Miralda attentissima (Nomura, 1936)
- Miralda austropacifica Oliver, W.R.B., 1915
- Miralda brevicula (Melvill & Standen, 1903)
- Miralda conica Laseron, 1959
- Miralda corona Saurin, 1959
- Miralda diadema (A. Adams, 1860)
- Miralda diademaeformis (Nomura, 1938)
- Miralda eximia (Dautzenberg & Fischer, 1907)
- Miralda fastigata Peñas & Rolán, 2017
- Miralda franciscae Saurin, 1958
- Miralda galloisi Saurin, 1959
- Miralda gemma (A. Adams, 1861)
- Miralda idalima Melvill, 1896
- Miralda ima (Melvill, 1906)
- Miralda laetitia (Melvill & Standen, 1903)
- † Miralda mellianensis Lozouet, 1998
- Miralda minusnodosa Peñas & Rolán, 2017
- Miralda montuosa Laseron, 1951
- Miralda nodulosa (Hornung & Mermod, 1924)
- Miralda opephora Melvill, J.C., 1898
- Miralda oscillaeformis Saurin, 1962
- Miralda parcecoronata Peñas & Rolán, 2017
- Miralda paucisculpta Peñas & Rolán, 2017
- Miralda paulbartschi (Pilsbry, 1918)
- Miralda philippinensis Peñas & Rolán, 2017
- Miralda pretiosa (Dautzenberg & Fischer, 1907)
- Miralda pretiosior Saurin, 1962
- Miralda primaliciae Saurin, 1962
- Miralda protogalea Peñas & Rolán, 2017
- Miralda pseudogemma Peñas & Rolán, 2017
- Miralda revincta (Hedley, 1912)
- Miralda robusta Peñas & Rolán, 2017
- Miralda scopulorum (Watson, 1886)
- Miralda senex (Hedley, 1902)
- Miralda sitizoi (Nomura, 1937)
- Miralda soteloi Rolan, 1994
- Miralda subnodosa Peñas & Rolán, 2017
- Miralda subtilstriae Peñas & Rolán, 2017
- Miralda superba Rolán & Fernandes, 1993
- Miralda suzettae Saurin, 1959
- Miralda temperata Rolán & Fernandes, 1993
- Miralda trinodosa Peñas & Rolán, 2017
- Miralda ultranodosa Peñas & Rolán, 2017
- Miralda umeralis (Hedley, 1902)

The following species were brought into synonymy

- Miralda abbotti: synonym of Ividella abbotti (Olsson & McGinty, 1958)
- Miralda aepynota: synonym of Ividia aepynota (Dall & Bartsch, 1909)
- Miralda annulata A. Adams, 1855: synonym of Oscilla annulata (A. Adams, 1854)
- Miralda azteca (Strong, A.M. & L.G. Hertlein, 1939): synonym of Odostomia azteca Strong, A.M. & L.G. Hertlein, 1939
- Miralda crispa G. B. Sowerby III, 1892 : synonym of Odostomia crispa (G. B. Sowerby III, 1892)
- Miralda elegans (de Folin, 1870): synonym of Liamorpha elegans (de Folin, 1870)
- Miralda gemmifera (Dautzenberg & Fischer, 1907): synonym of Liamorpha gemmifera (Dautzenberg & H. Fischer, 1907)
- Miralda havanensis: synonym of Ividia havanensis (Pilsbry & Aguayo, 1933)
- Miralda ligata (Angas, 1877): synonym of Oscilla ligata Angas, 1877
- Miralda mariella: synonym of Egilina mariella (A. Adams, 1860)
- Miralda neofelixoides (Nomura, 1936): synonym of Iolaea neofelixoides (Nomura, 1936)
- Miralda pupu Pilsbry, 1918: synonym of Hinemoa indica (Melvill, 1896)
- Miralda robertsoni Altena, 1975: synonym of Iolaea robertsoni (van Regteren Altena, 1975)
- Miralda scitula (A. Adams, 1860): synonym of Iolaea scitula (A. Adams, 1860)
- Miralda suprasculpta: synonym of Hinemoa suprasculpta (Tenison Woods, 1878)
- Miralda syrtites Pilsbry, 1917: synonym of Miralda scopulorum (R. B. Watson, 1886)
- Miralda terryi (Olsson & McGinty, 1958): synonym of Ivara terryi (Olsson & McGinty, 1958)
