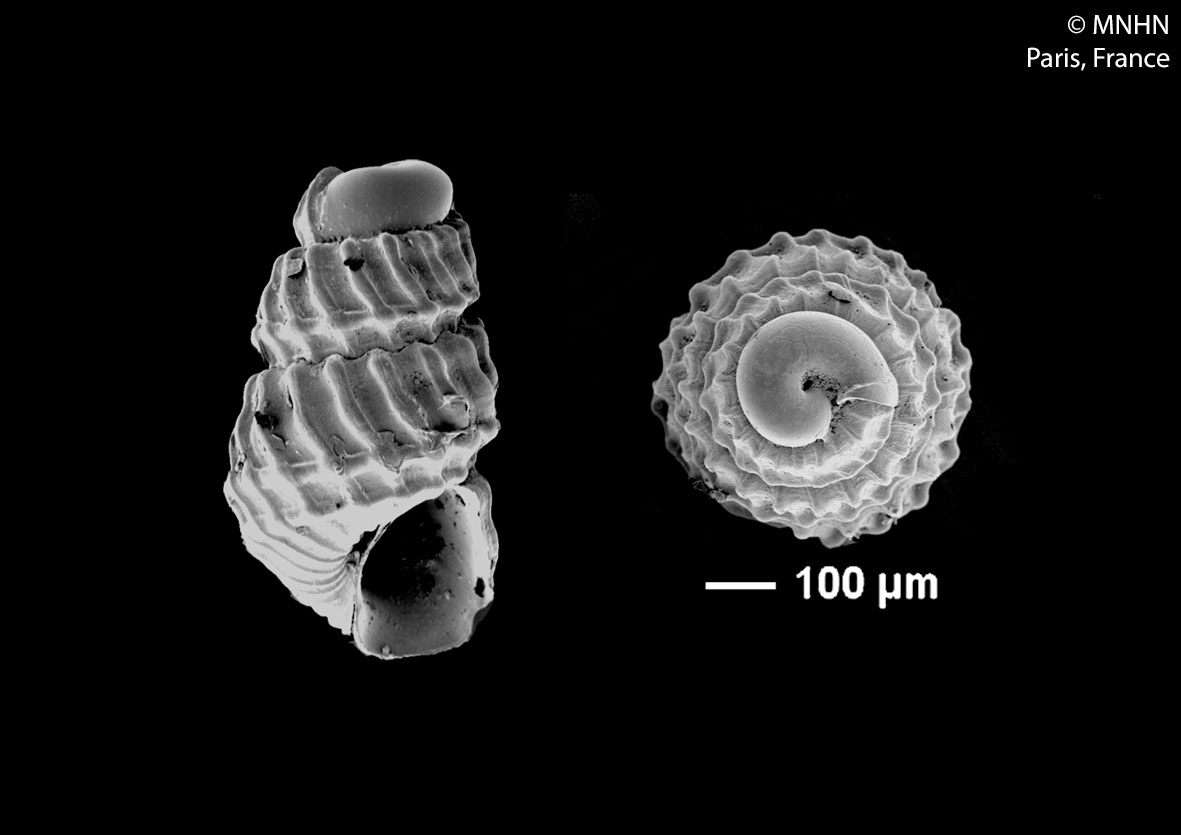
- Shell of Folinella acupicta

Scientific classification
- Kingdom: Animalia
- Phylum: Mollusca
- Class: Gastropoda
- Subcohort: Panpulmonata
- Superfamily: Pyramidelloidea
- Family: Pyramidellidae
- Genus: Folinella; Dall & Bartsch, 1904

Type species
- Amoura anguliferens de Folin, 1873

= Folinella =

Genus of gastropods

Folinella is a genus of minute sea snails, pyramidellid gastropod mollusks or micromollusks in the family Pyramidellidae within the tribe Chrysallidini.

== Description ==
The whorls of the teleoconch are sculptured similarly throughout. The axial ribs are rounded. The spiral markings consist of two tumid ridges, one at the periphery and one at the summit of the whorls; with many striations on the base.

== Species ==
- Folinella acupicta Peñas & Rolán, 2017
- Folinella anguliferens (de Folin, 1873)
- Folinella binilicia Peñas & Rolán, 2017
- Folinella excavata (Phillippi, 1836)
- Folinella ghisottii van Aartsen, 1984
- Folinella holthuisi van Aartsen, Gittenberger E. & Goud, 1998
- Folinella moolenbeeki van Aartsen, Gittenberger E. & Goud, 1998

Species brought into synonymy

- Folinella maoria (Powell, 1940): synonym of Ividella maoria Powell, 1940
- Folinella navisa (Dall & Bartsch, 1907): synonym of Chrysallida navisa (Dall & Bartsch, 1907)
- Folinella quinquecincta (Carpenter, 1856): synonym of Ividella quinquecincta (Carpenter, 1857)
- Folinella robertsoni (Altena, 1975): synonym of Iolaea robertsoni (van Regteren Altena, 1975)
- † Folinella spinosula Micali, 1992: synonym of † Mulderia spinosula (Micali, 1992) (original combination)
