= Hinemoa (disambiguation) =

Hinemoa is a popular female Māori given name, often shortened to Hine. It is particularly associated with Hinemoa and Tūtānekai, a Māori legend about a couple kept apart. Other people with the name include:

- Hinemoa Elder, New Zealand youth forensic psychiatrist

The name can also refer to:

== Films ==
- Hinemoa (1913 film), a silent film made in New Zealand (1913) by Gaston Méliès
- Hinemoa (1914 film), a silent film made in New Zealand (1914) by George Tarr
- The Romance of Hine-moa, a silent film made in New Zealand (1927) by Gustav Pauli

== Snails ==
- Hinemoa (gastropod), a genus of small sea snails
- Hinemoa forticingulata, a species of sea snail
- Hinemoa indica, a species of sea snail
- Hinemoa punicea, a species of sea snail
- Placostylus ambagiosus hinemoa, an extinct subspecies of very large, air-breathing land snail
- Cantharidus antipoda hinemoa, a subspecies of sea snail

== Other ==
- Hinemoa Planitia, a plain on the planet Venus
- NZGSS Hinemoa, a New Zealand government steamer
