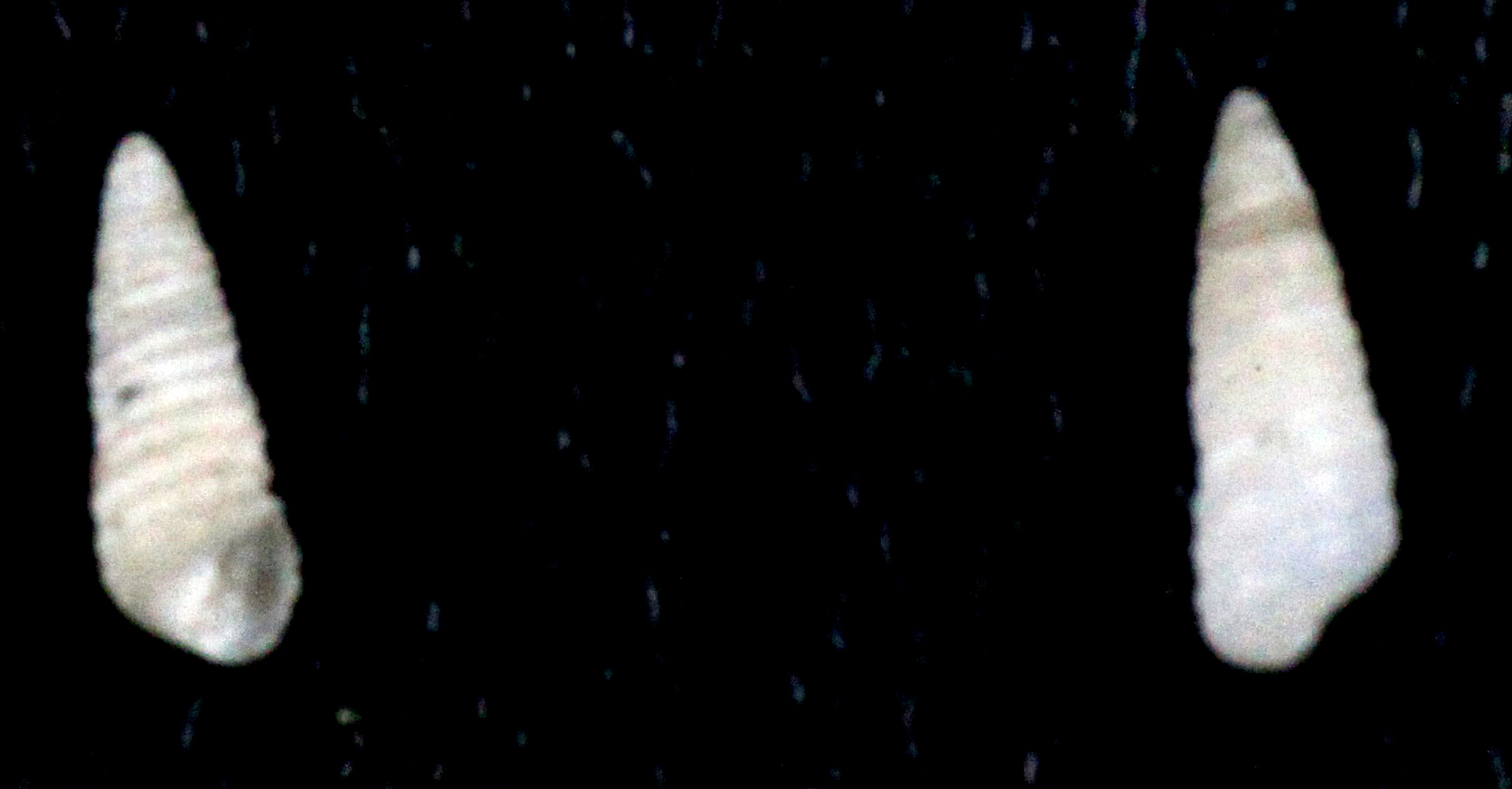
- Oscilla tricordata

Scientific classification
- Kingdom: Animalia
- Phylum: Mollusca
- Class: Gastropoda
- Subcohort: Panpulmonata
- Superfamily: Pyramidelloidea
- Family: Pyramidellidae
- Genus: Oscilla; A. Adams, 1861

Type species
- Monoptygma cingulata A. Adams, 1861

Synonyms
- Miralda (Oscilla) A. Adams, 1861

= Oscilla (gastropod) =

Genus of gastropods

Oscilla is a genus of very small sea snails, minute marine gastropod mollusks or micromollusks. This genus is currently placed in the subfamily Chrysallidinae of the family Pyramidellidae.

These marine gastropods have shells with intorted protoconchs.

== Life history ==
Little is known about the biology of the members of this genus. As is true of most members of the Pyramidellidae sensu lato, they are likely to be ectoparasites.

Oscilla jocosa may possibly be a parasite on Trochus erithreus (Mienis 2003).

== Species of Oscilla ==
The following species are mentioned in WoRMS:

- Oscilla annulata (A. Adams in H. & A. Adams, 1853)
- Oscilla appeliusi (Hornung & Mermod, 1925)
- Oscilla aqabaensis Peñas, Rolán & Sabelli, 2020
- Oscilla aquilonia Pimenta, Santos & Absalao, 2008
- Oscilla axialyrae Peñas & Rolán, 2017
- Oscilla beccarii (Hormung & Mermod, 1924)
- Oscilla bellardii (Hornung & Mermod, 1924)
- Oscilla bifida Peñas & Rolán, 2017
- Oscilla cingulata (A. Adams, 1861) (Type species) (as Monoptygma (Oscilla) cingulata)
- Oscilla circinata A. Adams, 1867
- Oscilla composita Peñas & Rolán, 2017
- Oscilla cylindrica de Folin, 1879)
- Oscilla duplex Laseron, 1959)
- Oscilla evanida Melvill, 1904
- Oscilla faceta Melvill, 1904
- Oscilla felix (Dall & Bartsch, 1906)
- Oscilla ficara (Bartsch, 1915)
- Oscilla fortefunis Peñas & Rolán, 2017
- Oscilla galilae Bogi, Karhan & Yokeş, 2012
- Oscilla gemella Peñas & Rolán, 2017
- Oscilla infraduplex Peñas & Rolán, 2017
- Oscilla istiusmodi Peñas & Rolán, 2017
- Oscilla jocosa Melvill, 1904
- Oscilla jocosior Saurin, 1959
- Oscilla koheii (Nomura, 1937)
- Oscilla ligata (Angas, 1877)
- Oscilla marquesensis Peñas & Rolán, 2017
- Oscilla mirabilis (Preston, 1905)
- Oscilla mirifica Peñas, Rolán & Sabelli, 2020
- Oscilla multifuniculi Peñas & Rolán, 2017
- Oscilla multistriata Peñas, Rolán & Sabelli, 2020
- Oscilla mutuensis (Nomura, 1938)
- Oscilla niasensis Thiele, 1925
- Oscilla notialis Pimenta, Santos & Absalao, 2008
- Oscilla obtusa (Gould, 1861 in 1859-61)
- Oscilla obtusantis (Saurin, 1961)
- Oscilla ogasaensis (Nomura, 1939)
- Oscilla ongcopensis (Saurin, 1961)
- Oscilla parvicoronata Peñas & Rolán, 2017
- Oscilla perfelix (Nomura, 1938)
- Oscilla punicea (W. R. B. Oliver, 1915)
- Oscilla pupula Thiele, 1925
- Oscilla sculptulata Peñas & Rolán, 2017
- Oscilla solomonensis Peñas & Rolán, 2017
- Oscilla somersi (Verrill & Bush, 1900)
- Oscilla sulcibasis Peñas & Rolán, 2017
- Oscilla tasmanica (Tenison-Woods, 1876)
- Oscilla tempeii (Nomura, 1937)
- Oscilla tornata (A. E. Verrill, 1884)
- Oscilla tricordata (Nomura, 1938)
- Oscilla uahukaensis Peñas & Rolán, 2017
- Oscilla vanuatuensis Peñas & Rolán, 2017
- Oscilla virginiae Peñas, Rolán & Sabelli, 2020
- Oscilla voorwindei (Laseron, 1959)

The following species are also mentioned in OBIS and Malacolog

- Oscilla biseriata Gabb, 1881
- Oscilla stupa (Hori, S. & H. Fukuda, 1999)

Species brought into synonymy

- Oscilla bosyuensis (Nomura, S., 1937): synonym of Odetta bosyuensis (Nomura, 1937)
- Oscilla dautzenbergi de Morgan, 1916 † : synonym of Pyrgula dautzenbergi (de Morgan, 1916) † (new combination)
- Oscilla fallax Thiele, 1925: synonym of Bulimoscilla fallax (Thiele, 1925)
- Oscilla gumia: synonym of Hinemoa gumia (Hedley, 1909)
- Oscilla indica Melvill, 1896: synonym of Hinemoa indica (Melvill, 1896)
- Oscilla insculpta (Carpenter) Keep, 1888: synonym of Iolaea eucosmia Dall & Bartsch, 1909
- Oscilla laquearia: synonym of Hinemoa laquearia (Hedley, 1909)
- Oscilla leviplex: synonym of Hinemoa leviplex Laseron, 1959
- Oscilla lirata (A. Adams, 1860): synonym of Odetta lirata (A. Adams, 1860)
- Oscilla migma: synonym of Hinemoa migma (Hedley, 1909)
- Oscilla sumatrana Thiele, 1925: synonym of Menesthella sumatrana (Thiele, 1925)

The European species have been revised by van Aartsen (1994).
