= Iolaea =

Scientific classification
- Kingdom: Animalia
- Phylum: Mollusca
- Class: Gastropoda
- Family: Pyramidellidae
- Tribe: Chrysallidini
- Genus: Iolaea; A. Adams, 1867

Species
- See text

Synonyms
- Iole A. Adams, 1860 (Invalid: junior homonym of Iole Blyth, 1844; Iolaea and Iolina are replacement names); Iolina Baily, 1948 (Invalid: unnecessary replacement name for Iolaea, by Baily treated as a junior homonym of Iolea Pascoe, 1858)

Genus of gastropods

Iolaea is a genus of small sea snails, pyramidellid gastropod mollusks in the tribe Chrysallidini within the family Pyramidellidae.

The genus was originally described as Iole A. Adams 1860, but since this name was preoccupied by a bird genus (Blyth, 1844) the name was emended to Iolae A. Adams 1867.

== Shell description ==
The original description (A. Adams 1860) of the genus Iole (later emended to Iolaea because the name was preoccupied) is: "Testa turrito-subulata, umbilicata; anfractibus convexiusculis, transversim sulcatis, sulcis subdistantibus, interstitiis longitudinaliter concinne striatis. Apertura oblonga, postice acuminata, antice integra, rotundata; labio libero, simplici, acuto."

He further comments: "This genus is founded upon a deep-water shell, of which, unfortunately, I possess but a single specimen. It most nearly resembles a perforate, elongated, sulcate Odostomia, without ant tooth or fold on the inner lip. I am unable to refer it to any genus, and consequently give it generic rank myself. The practice of throwing a doubtful form into any genus seems to me to retard the progress of science, - shirking a difficulty, and confusing the mind of the student. The number of genera is no more moment to the naturalist than the number of species, provided they each represent a particular type of form. The natural position of Iole is, perhaps, between Monoptygma and Menestho."

Adams description from 1867 is as follows: "Testa tenuis, turbinato-turrita, umbilicata, seu rimata; anfractibus sculptis, convexis, transversim liratis; apertura ovata; plica parietali obsoleta aut celata."

A. Adams (1867) comments further: "I established this little group under the name of Iole in the 'annals' for 1860, founding my diagnosis on a single specimen. Since then, however, I have succeeded in obtaining both I. scitula and another species, I. amabilis, in greater abundance; and I find that on breaking some examples the parietal plica exists, but it is entirely concealed. In I. amabilis it is conspicuous externally. The description and natural position of the genus, however, I still consider correct. I have altered the termination of the word Iole, as there is a genus of birds under that name. The group differs from Oscilla in being thin and turbinate, with the axis more or less perforated, and with the parietal fold either obsolete or entirely concealed".

The original description of the type species is (A. Adams 1860): "I. testa subulato-turrita, profunde umbilicata, alba, solidiuscula; anfractibus sex, convexiusculis, transversim sulcatis, sulcis subdistantibus, interstitiis longitudinaliter concinne striatis; apertura oblonga, antice rotundata, postice acuminata; labio simplici; labro margine acuto. Hab. Straits of Korea; dredged from 63 fathoms."

== Ecology ==
Little is known about the biology of the members of this genus. As is true of most members of the Pyramidellidae sensu lato, they are most likely ectoparasites. It has been reported living on the serpulid polychaete Pomatoleios kraussi (Barird) which is likely the host. Hori & Kuroda (2001) described spermatophores from the species Iolaea scitula. Spermatophores are also known from other members of the Chrysallidinae.

== Species ==
Species within the genus Iolaea include:

- Iolaea amazonica van Aartsen & Wesselingh, 2005
- Iolaea dubia Golikov & Kussaki, 1967
- Iolaea eucosmia Dall & Bartsch, 1909
- Iolaea neofelixoides (Nomura, 1936)
- Iolaea robertsoni (van Regteren Altena, 1975)
- Iolaea scitula (A. Adams, 1860) - type species
- Iolaea sculptilis (A. Adams, 1861)
