= Ividia =

Scientific classification
- Kingdom: Animalia
- Phylum: Mollusca
- Class: Gastropoda
- Family: Pyramidellidae
- Genus: Ividia; Dall & Bartsch, 1904

Genus of gastropods

Ividia is a genus of sea snails, marine gastropod mollusks, in the family Pyramidellidae.

== Species ==
Species within the genus Ividia include:

- Ividia aepynota (Dall & Bartsch, 1909)
- Ividia armata (Carpenter, 1857)
- Ividia havanensis (Pilsbry & Aguayo, 1933)
