= Oscilla ficara =

Scientific classification
- Kingdom: Animalia
- Phylum: Mollusca
- Class: Gastropoda
- Family: Pyramidellidae
- Genus: Oscilla
- Species: O. ficara

Binomial name
- Oscilla ficara (Bartsch, 1915)

Species of gastropod

Oscilla ficara is a species of sea snail, a marine gastropod mollusk in the family Pyramidellidae, the pyrams and their allies.
