= Oscilla tornata =

Scientific classification
- Kingdom: Animalia
- Phylum: Mollusca
- Class: Gastropoda
- Family: Pyramidellidae
- Genus: Oscilla
- Species: O. tornata

Binomial name
- Oscilla tornata (A. E. Verrill, 1884)

Synonyms
- Odostomia tornata A. E. Verrill, 1884 (basionym)

Species of gastropod

Oscilla tornata is a species of sea snail, a marine gastropod mollusk in the family Pyramidellidae, the pyrams and their allies.

== Description ==
The length of the shell measures 3 mm.

== Distribution ==
This species occurs in the following locations:

- Northwest Atlantic from North Carolina to the Florida Keys at depths between 27 m and 260 m.
