= Folinella moolenbeeki =

Scientific classification
- Kingdom: Animalia
- Phylum: Mollusca
- Class: Gastropoda
- Family: Pyramidellidae
- Genus: Folinella
- Species: F. moolenbeeki

Binomial name
- Folinella moolenbeeki van Aartsen, Gittenberger E. & Goud, 1998

Synonyms
- Chrysallida jordii Peñas & Rolán, 1998

Species of gastropod

Folinella moolenbeeki is a species of sea snail, a marine gastropod mollusk in the family Pyramidellidae, the pyrams and their allies.

== Description ==
The shell size varies between 2 mm and 2.5 mm. Folinella moolenbeeki was identified during the Dutch CANCAP and MAURITANIA expeditions in the southeastern part of the North Atlantic Ocean.

== Distribution ==
This species occurs in the Atlantic Ocean off Mauritania.
