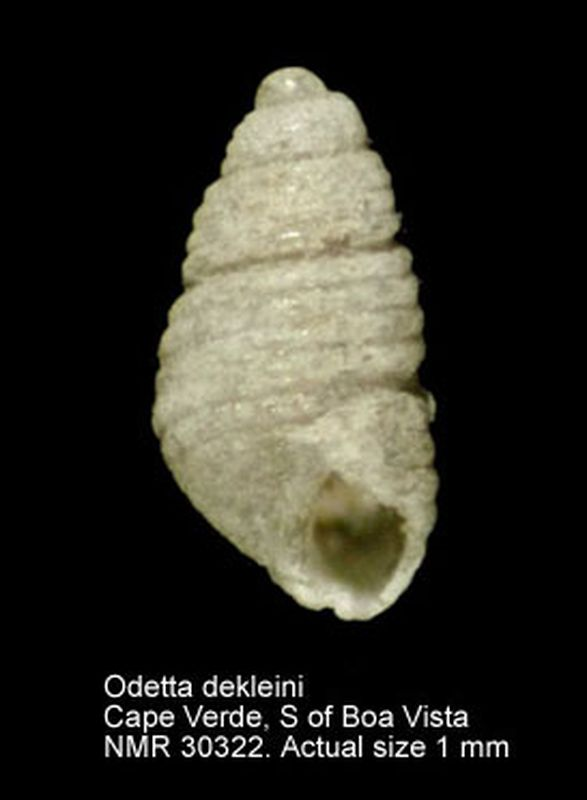

Scientific classification
- Kingdom: Animalia
- Phylum: Mollusca
- Class: Gastropoda
- Family: Pyramidellidae
- Genus: Odetta
- Species: O. dekleini

Binomial name
- Odetta dekleini van Aartsen, Gittenberger E. & Goud, 1998

Synonyms
- Odostomia dekleini (van Aartsen, Gittenberger E. & Goud, 1998)

= Odetta dekleini =

Species of gastropod

Odetta dekleini is a species of sea snail, a marine gastropod mollusk in the family Pyramidellidae, the pyrams and their allies.

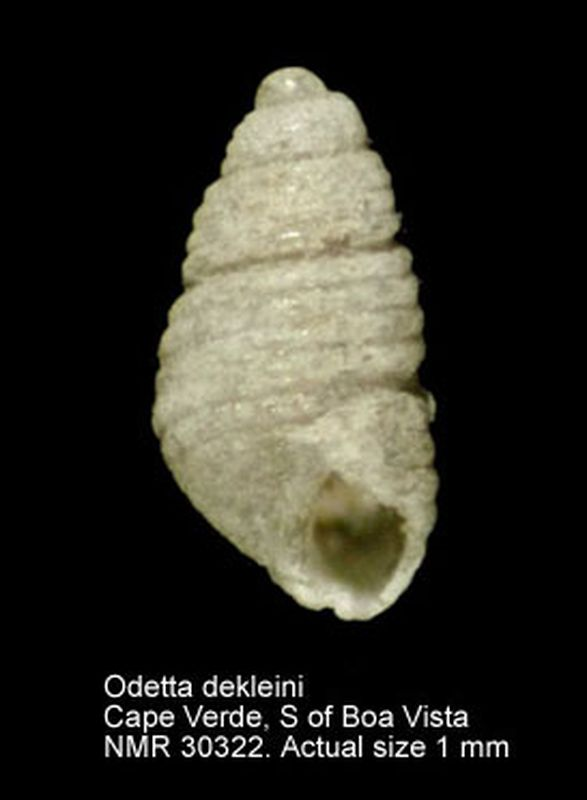

== Morphology ==
See Gastropod shell § Morphology

Odetta dekleini was described based on shell specimens. Nothing is known about the soft body of the animal.

The shell is semi-transparent white and egg-shaped with poorly marked sutures and a somewhat pupoidal top. It has no umbilicus. The embryonic whorls are intorted (type B). The shell is around 0.6mm wide and the height varies between 1.1 mm and 1.3 mm.

== Distribution ==
This species occurs in the Atlantic Ocean off the Cape Verde Islands and São Tomé and Principe. Specimens have been collected from a depth of 42—420m.

== Description and etymology ==
Odetta dekleini was first described by the Dutch macologists in 1998 by Jacobus Johannes van Aartsen and Edmund Gittenberger based on specimens collected off of the Cape Verde Islands. The species name was chosen in honor of a friend of the Aartsen, Dr. W. J. de Klein.
