= Ividella mariae =

Scientific classification
- Kingdom: Animalia
- Phylum: Mollusca
- Class: Gastropoda
- Family: Pyramidellidae
- Genus: Ividella
- Species: I. mariae

Binomial name
- Ividella mariae Bartsch, 1928

Synonyms
- Chrysallida (Ividella) mariae Bartsch, 1928

Species of gastropod

Ividella mariae is a species of sea snail, a marine gastropod mollusc in the family Pyramidellidae, the pyrams and their allies.

== Distribution ==
This species occurs in the Pacific Ocean off Peru.
