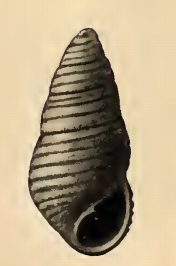
- Apertural view of Oscilla circinata

Scientific classification
- Kingdom: Animalia
- Phylum: Mollusca
- Class: Gastropoda
- Family: Pyramidellidae
- Genus: Oscilla
- Species: O. circinata

Binomial name
- Oscilla circinata A. Adams, 1867

Synonyms
- Odostomia (Odetta) circinata A. Adams, 1867

= Oscilla circinata =

Species of gastropod

Oscilla circinata is a species of sea snail, a marine gastropod mollusk in the family Pyramidellidae, the pyrams and their allies.

== Description ==
The elongate-oval shell is subdiaphanous. It measures 2.1 mm. The whorls of the protoconch are small, almost completely immersed in the first post-nuclear whorl, only the rounded two-thirds of the last volution are visible, and those indicate that the axis of the nuclear turns must be at a right angle to the axis of the later whorls. The five whorls of the teleoconch are moderately well rounded, the last one somewhat inflated, shouldered. They are marked by strong, broadly rounded, subequal and subequally spaced spiral keels. These are separated by deep, rounded sulci, which are about as wide as the keels. The sulci are crossed by extremely fine and very closely spaced axial raised threads which pass up on the sides of the spiral keels, but do not cross their summits. The second and third whorls have three keels between the sutures. On the third whorl the posterior keel at the summit of the whorl, which is a little wider than the other two, shows a spiral striation on its middle. This grows gradually stronger as the shell advances, until on the penultimate whorl it has divided this keel into two, the posterior one of which is a little less developed than the anterior one, which resembles the other between the sutures. The summit of the last whorl falls considerably below the periphery, showing five spiral keels between the sutures on the penultimate whorl. The periphery of the body whorl is sulcate. The sulcus is like the rest and is similarly sculptured. The base of the shell is well rounded, somewhat attenuated anteriorly, sculptured like the spaces between the sutures, having seven spiral keels. These keels diminish somewhat in size from the periphery to the umbilical area. The aperture is subovate. The posterior angle is acute. The outer lip thin, wavy, showing the external sculpture within. The columella is decidedly curved, reinforced anteriorly by the attenuated base. It is provided with a very strong, acute, oblique fold near its insertion. The parietal wall is covered by a thin callus.

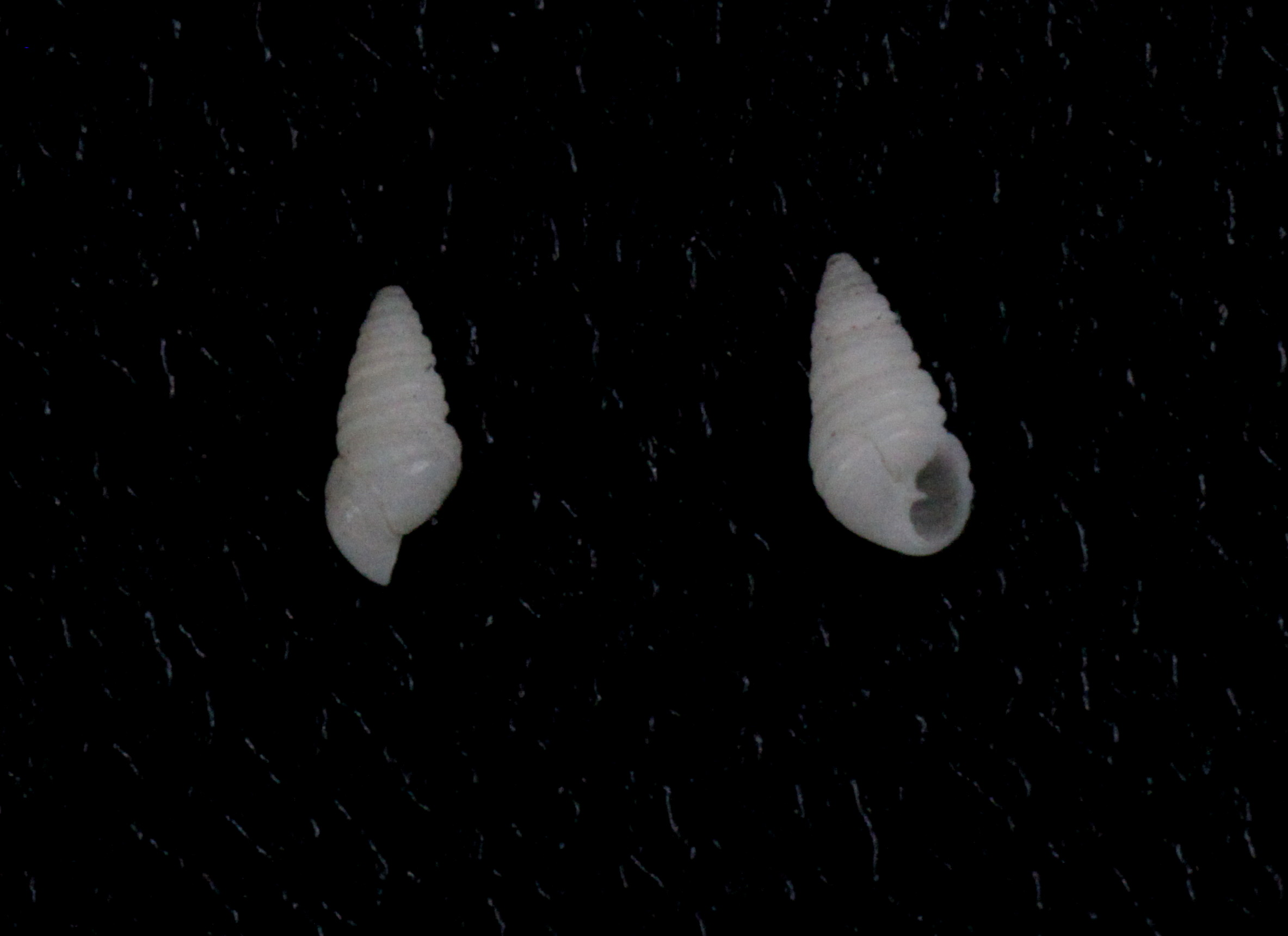
Oscilla circinata

== Distribution ==
This marine species is found off Japan.
