= Iolaea dubia =

Scientific classification
- Kingdom: Animalia
- Phylum: Mollusca
- Class: Gastropoda
- Family: Pyramidellidae
- Genus: Iolaea
- Species: I. dubia

Binomial name
- Iolaea dubia Golikov & Kussakin in Golikov & Scarlato, 1967

Species of gastropod

Iolaea dubia is a species of sea snail, a marine gastropod mollusk in the family Pyramidellidae, the pyrams and their allies.

== Habitat ==
This species is found in the following habitats:

- Brackish
- Marine
