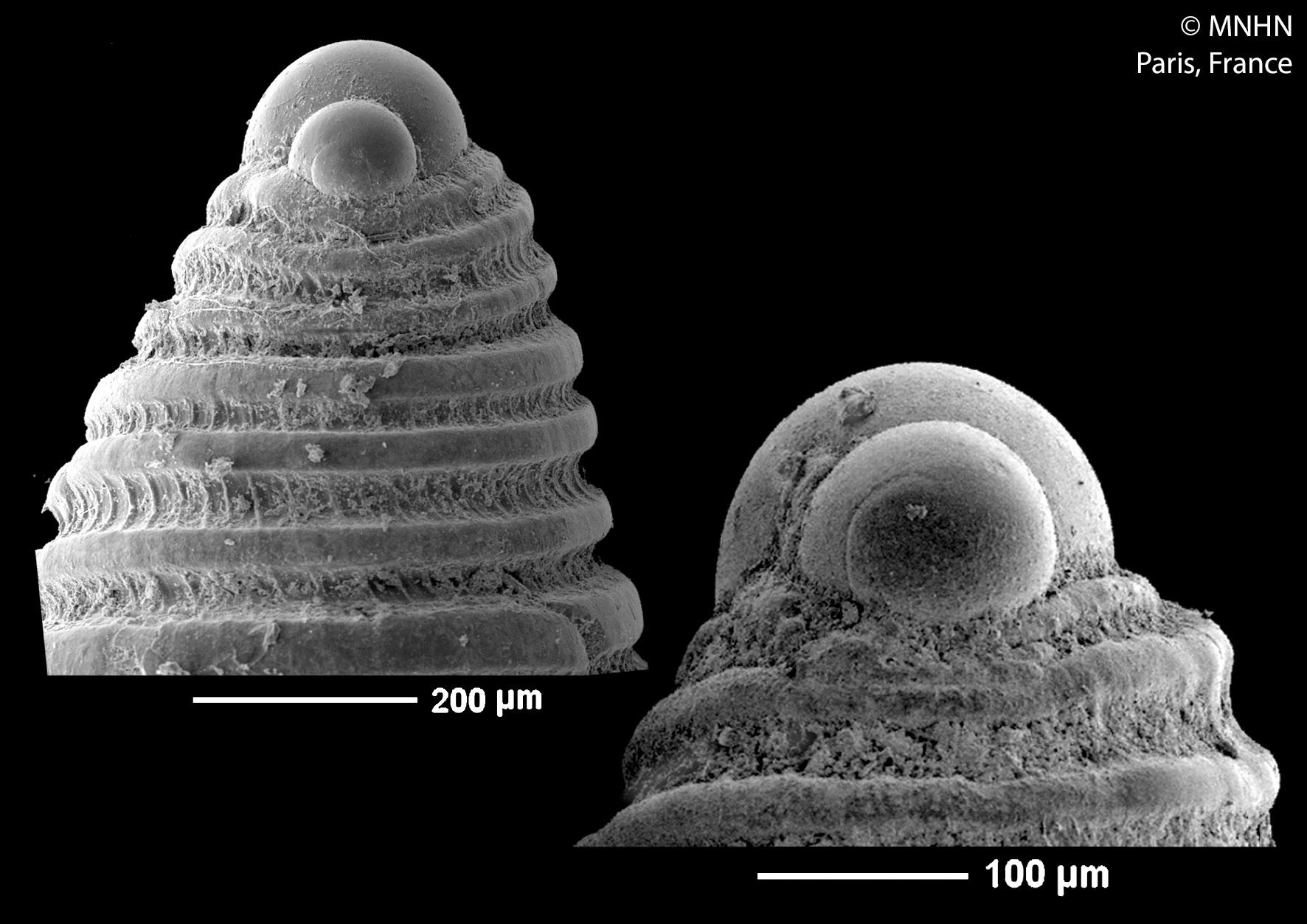
- Shell of Oscilla jocosa (specimen at MNHN, Paris)

Scientific classification
- Kingdom: Animalia
- Phylum: Mollusca
- Class: Gastropoda
- Family: Pyramidellidae
- Genus: Oscilla
- Species: O. jocosa

Binomial name
- Oscilla jocosa Melvill, 1904

= Oscilla jocosa =

Species of gastropod

Oscilla jocosa is a species of sea snail, a marine gastropod mollusk in the family Pyramidellidae, the pyrams and their allies.

== Description ==
The length of the white, turriculated shell measures 2.5 mm. The protoconch is planorbid. The teleoconch contains five flattened whorls. The sculpture is marked by three rounded, slightly beaded, spiral cords. The columella has a marked tooth.

== Distribution ==
This species occurs in the following locations:

- Gulf of Oman
- Mediterranean Sea, as an invasive species (off Haifa, Israel)
