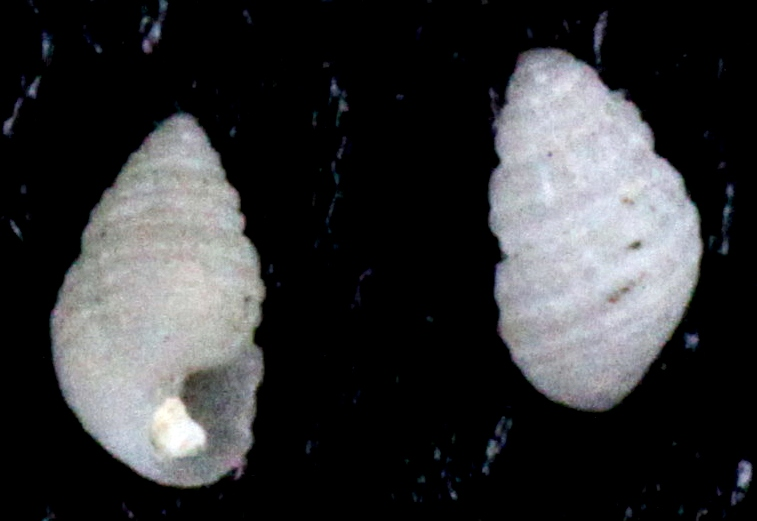

Scientific classification
- Kingdom: Animalia
- Phylum: Mollusca
- Class: Gastropoda
- Family: Pyramidellidae
- Genus: Miralda
- Species: M. diadema

Binomial name
- Miralda diadema (A. Adams, 1860)

Synonyms
- Odostomia (Miralda) diadema (A. Adams, 1860); Parthenia diadema A. Adams, 1860 (basionym)

= Miralda diadema =

Species of gastropod

Miralda diadema is a species of sea snail, a marine gastropod mollusc in the family Pyramidellidae, the pyrams and their allies.

== Description ==
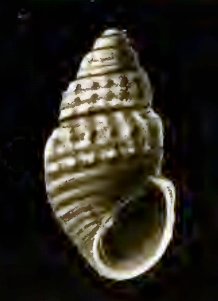
Apertural view of Miralda diadema

The white, small shell grows to a length of 1.8 mm. It is subovate, minutely umbilicated, with the summits of the whorls decidedly tabulated. The two helicoid whorls of the protoconch are moderately large, and about one-third immersed in the later whorls. The five whorls of the teleoconch are moderately rounded, decidedly tabulated at the summit,. They are ornamented by rounded, axial ribs which quickly diminish in strength as they pass from the summit of the whorls to the periphery. Sixteen of these ribs occur upon the second, and twenty upon the penultimate whorl. The ribs are thickened at the anterior termination of the shoulder and render it decidedly crenulated. The intercostal spaces are a little wider than the ribs. In addition to the axial ribs the whorls are marked by strong spiral cords, two of which can be seen between the sutures on the first and second and four and one-half upon the penultimate whorl. The junction of the posterior one of these two cords and the axial ribs form a series of tubercles. The anterior cord is only slightly tuberculated, the ribs extending only feebly to it. The periphery and the base of the body whorl are well rounded, the latter decidedly attenuated and marked by seven subequal and subequally spaced spiral keels. The suboval aperture is large. The posterior angle is very obtuse. The outer lip is thick. The columella is re-enforced by the attenuated base, curved. It is provided with a conspicuous oblique fold near its insertion. The parietal wall is covered by a moderately thick callus.

== Distribution ==
This species occurs in the Pacific Ocean off Japan and the Philippines .
