= Ividella mendozae =

Scientific classification
- Kingdom: Animalia
- Phylum: Mollusca
- Class: Gastropoda
- Family: Pyramidellidae
- Genus: Ividella
- Species: I. mendozae

Binomial name
- Ividella mendozae Baker, Hanna & Strong, 1928

Species of gastropod

Ividella mendozae is a species of sea snail, a marine gastropod mollusc in the family Pyramidellidae, the pyrams and their allies.
