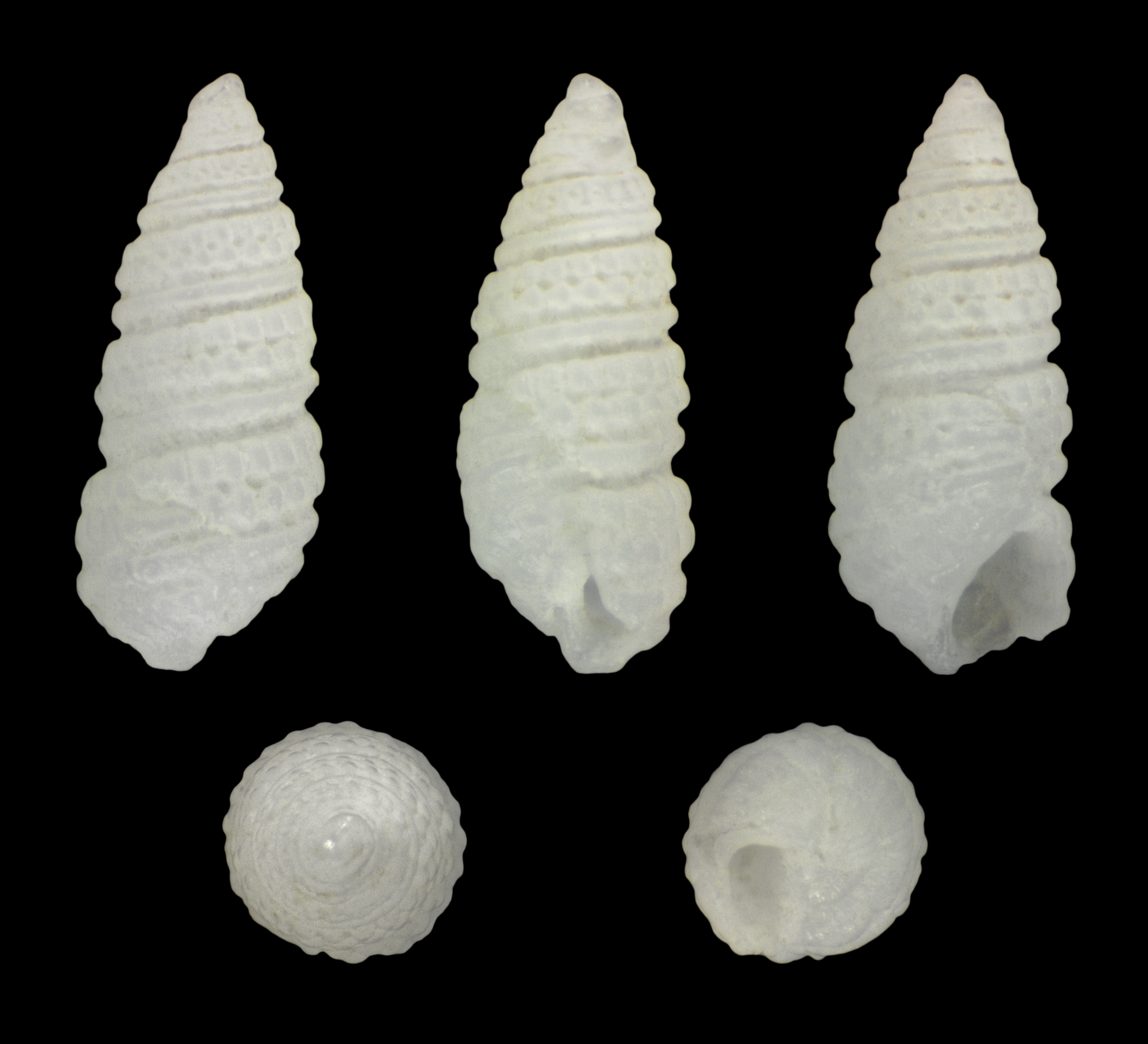

Scientific classification
- Kingdom: Animalia
- Phylum: Mollusca
- Class: Gastropoda
- Family: Pyramidellidae
- Genus: Miralda
- Species: M. scopulorum

Binomial name
- Miralda scopulorum (Watson, 1886)

Synonyms
- Odostomia scopulorum Watson, 1886

= Miralda scopulorum =

Species of gastropod

Miralda scopulorum is a species of sea snail, a marine gastropod mollusc in the family Pyramidellidae, the pyrams and their allies.

== Description ==
The shell can grow up to a length of 1.6 mm (0.063 in). Small, oblong, whorled, white with deep suture and short round base. Porcelain white in color.

== Distribution ==
This species occurs in the Pacific Ocean off the Philippines and Hawaii.
