= Oscilla galilae =

Scientific classification
- Kingdom: Animalia
- Phylum: Mollusca
- Class: Gastropoda
- Family: Pyramidellidae
- Genus: Oscilla
- Species: O. galilae

Binomial name
- Oscilla galilae Bogi, Karhan & Yokeş, 2012

Synonyms
- Hinemoa cylindrica (de Folin, 1879), sensu Buzzurro et al., 2001 (misidentification)

Species of gastropod

Oscilla galilae is a species of sea snail, a marine gastropod mollusk in the family Pyramidellidae, the pyrams and their allies.

== Distribution ==
This species occurs in the following locations:

- Mediterranean Sea
