= Ividella ulloana =

Scientific classification
- Kingdom: Animalia
- Phylum: Mollusca
- Class: Gastropoda
- Family: Pyramidellidae
- Genus: Ividella
- Species: I. ulloana

Binomial name
- Ividella ulloana Strong, 1949

Species of gastropod

Ividella ulloana is a species of sea snail, a marine gastropod mollusc in the family Pyramidellidae, the pyrams and their allies.
