= Miralda senex =

Scientific classification
- Kingdom: Animalia
- Phylum: Mollusca
- Class: Gastropoda
- Family: Pyramidellidae
- Genus: Miralda
- Species: M. senex

Binomial name
- Miralda senex (Hedley, 1902)

Synonyms
- Pyrgulina senex Hedley, 1902 (original combination)

Species of gastropod

Miralda senex is a species of sea snail, a marine gastropod mollusk in the family Pyramidellidae, the pyrams and their allies.

== Distribution ==
This marine species occurs off Queensland, Australia.
