= Folinella holthuisi =

Scientific classification
- Kingdom: Animalia
- Phylum: Mollusca
- Class: Gastropoda
- Family: Pyramidellidae
- Genus: Folinella
- Species: F. holthuisi

Binomial name
- Folinella holthuisi van Aartsen, Gittenberger E. & Goud, 1998

Species of gastropod

Folinella holthuisi is a species of sea snail, a marine gastropod mollusk in the family Pyramidellidae, the pyrams and their allies.

== Description ==
The shell grows to a length of 2.2 mm.

== Distribution ==
This species occurs in the Atlantic Ocean off Mauritania.
