= Folinella ghisottii =

Scientific classification
- Kingdom: Animalia
- Phylum: Mollusca
- Class: Gastropoda
- Family: Pyramidellidae
- Genus: Folinella
- Species: F. ghisottii

Binomial name
- Folinella ghisottii van Aartsen, 1984

Synonyms
- Chrysallida ghisottii (van Aartsen, 1984); Odostomia intermedia Brusina, 1869 (Invalid: junior homonym of Odostomia intermedia Deshayes, 1861; Folinella ghisottii is a replacement name)

Species of gastropod

Folinella ghisottii is a species of sea snail, a marine gastropod mollusk in the family Pyramidellidae, the pyrams and their allies.

== Distribution ==
This marine species occurs in the following locations:

- European waters (ERMS scope)
- Greek Exclusive Economic Zone
- Portuguese Exclusive Economic Zone
- Spanish Exclusive Economic Zone
