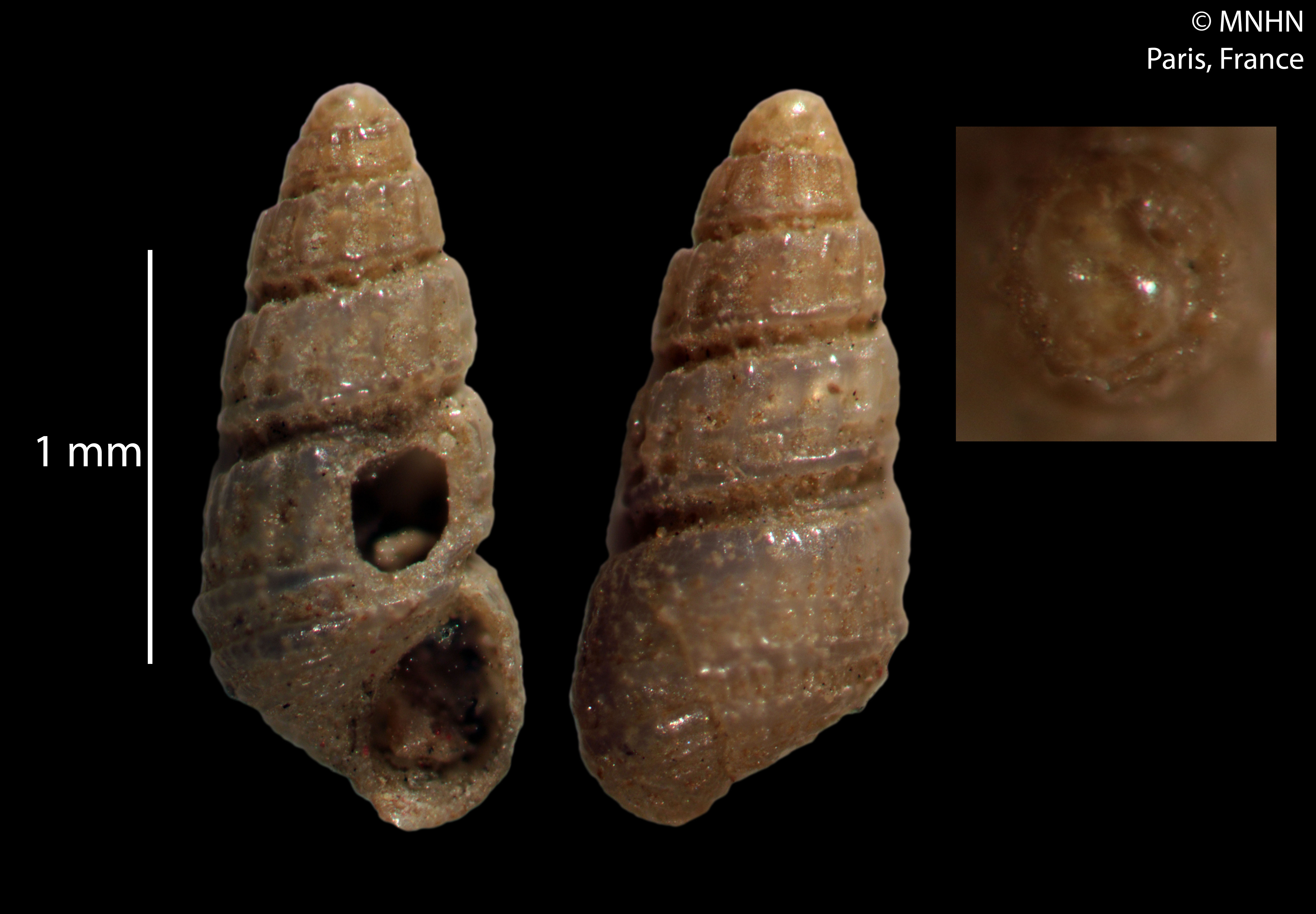
- Shell of Miralda superba (paratype at MNHN, Paris)

Scientific classification
- Kingdom: Animalia
- Phylum: Mollusca
- Class: Gastropoda
- Family: Pyramidellidae
- Genus: Miralda
- Species: M. superba

Binomial name
- Miralda superba Rolán & Fernandes, 1993

= Miralda superba =

Species of gastropod

Miralda superba is a species of sea snail, a marine gastropod mollusc in the family Pyramidellidae, the pyrams and their allies.

== Distribution ==
This species occurs in the Atlantic Ocean off Angola.
