= Oscilla somersi =

Scientific classification
- Kingdom: Animalia
- Phylum: Mollusca
- Class: Gastropoda
- Family: Pyramidellidae
- Genus: Oscilla
- Species: O. somersi

Binomial name
- Oscilla somersi (Verrill & Bush, 1900)

Synonyms
- Odostomia somersi Verrill & Bush, 1900 (basionym); Boonea somersi (Verrill & Bush, 1900)

Species of sea snail

Oscilla somersi is a species of sea snail, a marine gastropod mollusk in the family Pyramidellidae, the pyrams and their allies.

== Description ==
The shell grows to a length of approximately 3 mm. The shell is conical and has strong spiral cords and a distinctly visible columellar fold.

== Distribution ==
This marine species occurs in the Caribbean Sea, Gulf of Mexico, Bermuda, Bahamas, and southeast Brazil.
