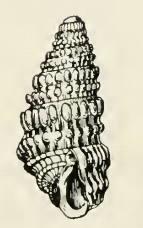
- Apertural view of the shell of Ividia armata

Scientific classification
- Kingdom: Animalia
- Phylum: Mollusca
- Class: Gastropoda
- Family: Pyramidellidae
- Genus: Ividia
- Species: I. armata

Binomial name
- Ividia armata Carpenter, 1856

Synonyms
- Odostomia armata Carpenter, 1856; Odostomia (Miralda) armata Carpenter, 1856; Parthenia armata Carpenter, 1856

= Ividia armata =

Species of gastropod

Ividia armata is a species of sea snail, a marine gastropod mollusk in the family Pyramidellidae, the pyrams and their allies.

== Description ==
The elongate-conic shell is white. Its length measures 2.5 mm. The two whorls of the protoconch are deeply, obliquely immersed in the first of the succeeding turns. The six whorls of the teleoconch are marked by two strongly elevated tuberculate keels between the sutures, the posterior one of which is about twice as wide as its neighbor. Of the crenulations about 20 appear upon the second and third, 22 upon the fourth, and 24 upon the penultimate turn. The sutures are strongly channeled. The periphery is marked by a slender keel, while the base has two a little weaker than the peripheral one which divides the space between this and the umbilical area into three equal parts. The aperture is ovate. The outer lip is thin. The columella is rather thick, reflected and provided with a slender fold at its insertion. The parietal wall is provided with a thin callus.

== Distribution ==
The type specimen was found in the Pacific Ocean off Mazatlán, Mexico.
