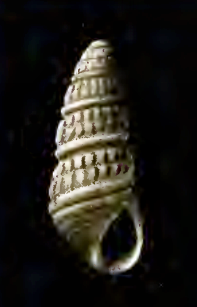
- Apertural view of Miralda gemma

Scientific classification
- Kingdom: Animalia
- Phylum: Mollusca
- Class: Gastropoda
- Family: Pyramidellidae
- Genus: Miralda
- Species: M. gemma

Binomial name
- Miralda gemma (A. Adams, 1861)

Synonyms
- Chrysallida gemma A. Adams, 1861 (basionym); Odostomia gemma (A. Adams, 1861)

= Miralda gemma =

Species of gastropod

Miralda gemma is a species of sea snail, a marine gastropod mollusc in the family Pyramidellidae, the pyrams and their allies.

== Description ==
The small, white shell grows to a length of 3 mm. It is elongate-conic, slender, slightly umbilicated. The at least two whorls of the protoconch are obliquely about half immersed in the first of the later whorls. The six whorls of the teleoconch are flattened, with strong tabulated and crenulated summits. They are crossed by three strong, rounded, subequally spaced, spiral keels and rounded axial ribs between the sutures. The latter extend from the summit to and over the second keel, but not over the sulcus separating this from the third. The junctions of the axial ribs and the spiral keels form strong tubercles. The sulcus between the second and the third keel is deep, decidedly deeper than the peripheral sulcus, both of which, as well as the sulci of the base, are crossed by minute closely placed, axial raised threads. The base of the body whorl is well rounded, somewhat attenuated. It is marked by live strong, rounded, subequal and subequally spaced spiral keels. The aperture is oval. The posterior angle is acute. The outer lip is wavy. The columella is short, curved and slightly revolute. It is provided with a quite strong oblique fold near its insertion. The parietal wall covered by a moderately thick callus.

== Distribution ==
This marine species occurs in the following locations:

- Madagascar
- Southeast Asia
- Japan
