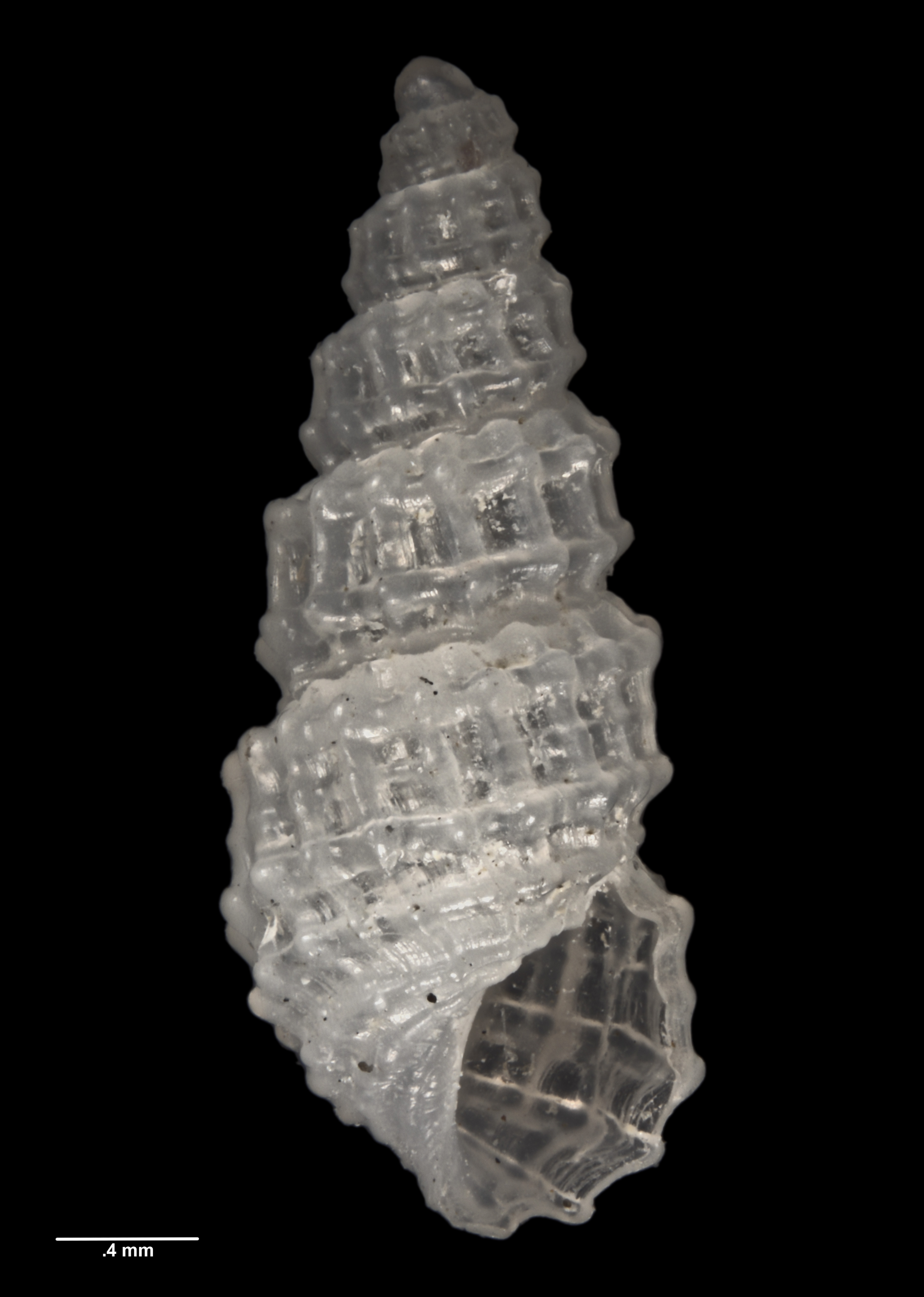
- Holotype from the Auckland War Memorial Museum

Scientific classification
- Kingdom: Animalia
- Phylum: Mollusca
- Class: Gastropoda
- Family: Pyramidellidae
- Genus: Ividella
- Species: I. maoria

Binomial name
- Ividella maoria (Powell, 1940)

= Ividella maoria =

Species of gastropod

Ividella maoria is a species of marine gastropod mollusc in the family Pyramidellidae. It was first described by Baden Powell in 1940. It is endemic to the waters of New Zealand. The mollusc was the first of its species to be identified in New Zealand, and as of 2022 remains the only endemic Ividella species in the country.

== Description ==
Ividella maoria has a small shell with a typical protoconch, and typically measures 3 millimetres in height and between one and three in diameter. The species looks very similar to the type species of the genus, Ividella navisa, but can be distinguished from its eastern Pacific counterpart by the presence of a narrow umbilical cleft.

== Distribution ==
The species is endemic to New Zealand. The first specimens were identified between Piwhane / Spirits Bay and Manawatāwhi / Three Kings Islands. Additional specimens have been found in the waters near Cape Maria van Diemen and the Poor Knights Islands.
