= Miralda austropacifica =

Scientific classification
- Kingdom: Animalia
- Phylum: Mollusca
- Class: Gastropoda
- Family: Pyramidellidae
- Genus: Miralda
- Species: M. austropacifica

Binomial name
- Miralda austropacifica Oliver, 1915

Species of gastropod

Miralda austropacifica is a species of sea snail, a marine gastropod mollusc in the family Pyramidellidae, the pyrams and their allies.
