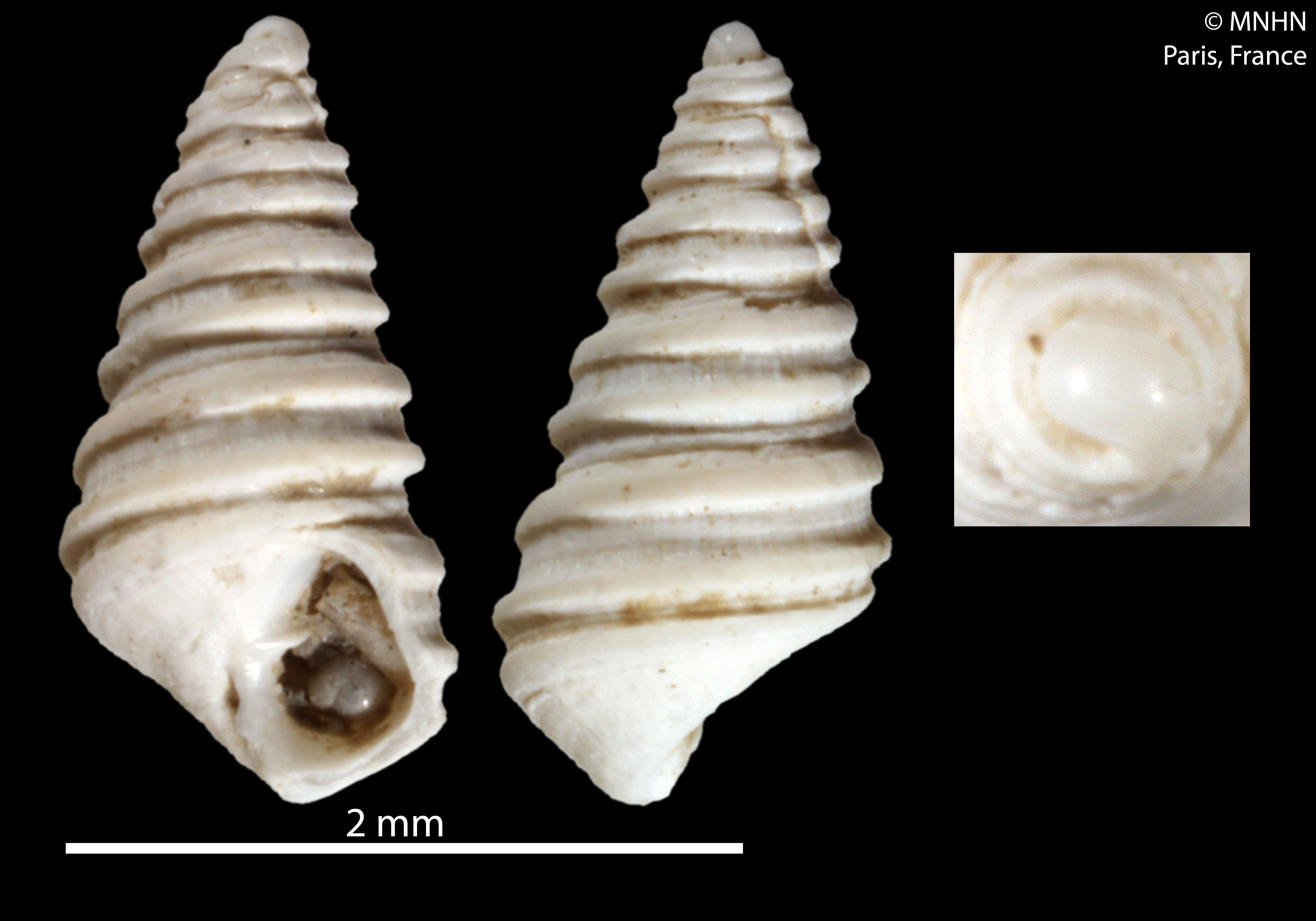
- Shell of Oscilla notialis (paratype at MNHN, Paris)

Scientific classification
- Kingdom: Animalia
- Phylum: Mollusca
- Class: Gastropoda
- Family: Pyramidellidae
- Genus: Oscilla
- Species: O. notialis

Binomial name
- Oscilla notialis Pimenta, Santos & Absalao, 2008

= Oscilla notialis =

Species of gastropod

Oscilla notialis is a species of sea snail, a marine gastropod mollusk in the family Pyramidellidae, the pyrams and their allies.

== Description ==
The length of the shell measures 1.9 mm.

== Distribution ==
This species occurs in the demersal zone of the Atlantic Ocean off Brazil at depths between 79 m and 327 m.
