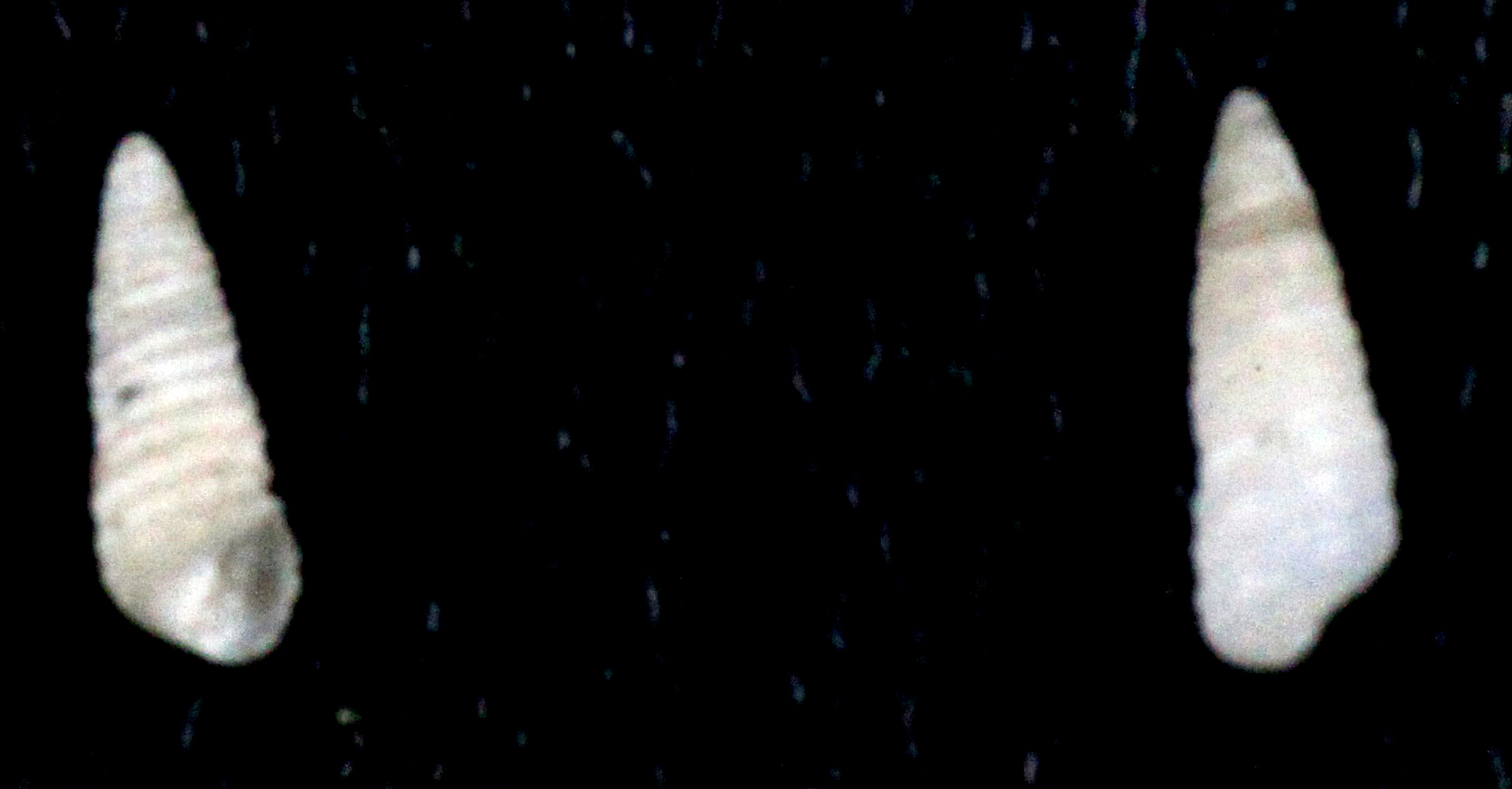
- Apertural and abapertural views of a shell of Oscilla tricordata

Scientific classification
- Kingdom: Animalia
- Phylum: Mollusca
- Class: Gastropoda
- Family: Pyramidellidae
- Genus: Oscilla
- Species: O. tricordata

Binomial name
- Oscilla tricordata (Nomura, 1938)

= Oscilla tricordata =

Species of gastropod

Oscilla tricordata is a species of sea snail, a marine gastropod mollusk in the family Pyramidellidae (the pyrams), which lives near Japan and Korea.
