= Miralda paulbartschi =

Scientific classification
- Kingdom: Animalia
- Phylum: Mollusca
- Class: Gastropoda
- Family: Pyramidellidae
- Genus: Miralda
- Species: M. paulbartschi

Binomial name
- Miralda paulbartschi (Pilsbry, 1918)

Species of gastropod

Miralda paulbartschi is a species of sea snail, a marine gastropod mollusc in the family Pyramidellidae, the pyrams and their allies.

== Distributions ==
This species occurs in the Pacific Ocean off Hawaii.
