= Miralda agana =

Scientific classification
- Kingdom: Animalia
- Phylum: Mollusca
- Class: Gastropoda
- Family: Pyramidellidae
- Genus: Miralda
- Species: M. agana

Binomial name
- Miralda agana Bartsch, 1915

Species of gastropod

Miralda agana is a species of sea snail, a marine gastropod mollusc in the family Pyramidellidae, the pyrams and their allies.

== Distribution ==
This marine species was found off Port Alfred, Eastern Cape, South Africa.
