= Odetta marci =

Scientific classification
- Kingdom: Animalia
- Phylum: Mollusca
- Class: Gastropoda
- Family: Pyramidellidae
- Genus: Odetta
- Species: O. marci

Binomial name
- Odetta marci van Aartsen, Gittenberger E. & Goud, 1998

Synonyms
- Odostomia marci (van Aartsen, Gittenberger E. & Goud, 1998)

Species of gastropod

Odetta marci is a species of sea snail, a marine gastropod mollusk in the family Pyramidellidae, the pyrams and their allies.

== Description ==
The shell attains a length of 3.8 mm

== Distribution ==
This species occurs in the Atlantic Ocean off Mauritania.
