= Miralda temperata =

Scientific classification
- Kingdom: Animalia
- Phylum: Mollusca
- Class: Gastropoda
- Family: Pyramidellidae
- Genus: Miralda
- Species: M. temperata

Binomial name
- Miralda temperata Rolán & Fernandes, 1993

Species of gastropod

Miralda temperata is a species of sea snail, a marine gastropod mollusc in the family Pyramidellidae, the pyrams and their allies.

== Distribution ==
This species occurs in the Atlantic Ocean off São Tomé and Principe.
