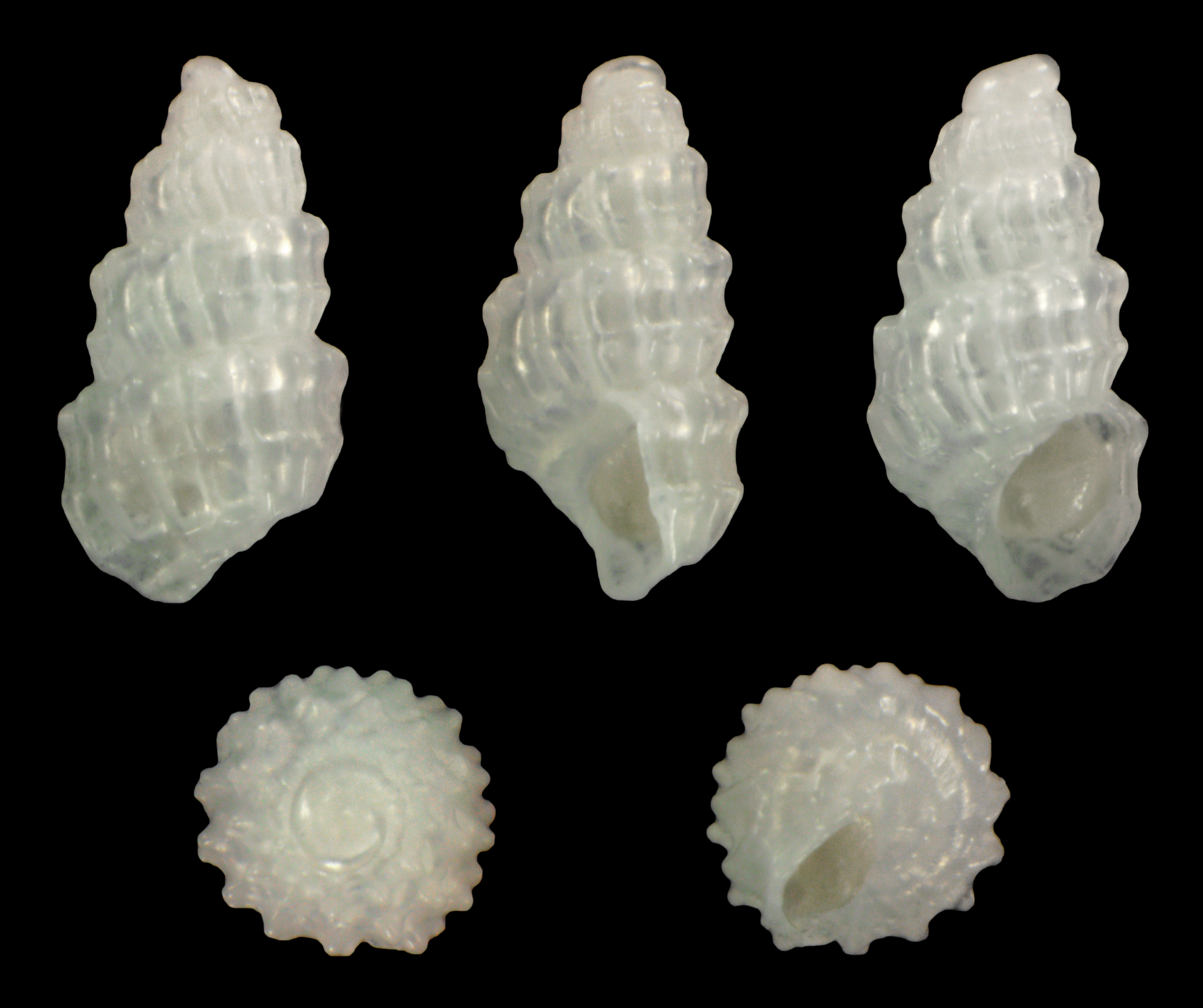
- A shell of Folinella excavata

Scientific classification
- Kingdom: Animalia
- Phylum: Mollusca
- Class: Gastropoda
- Family: Pyramidellidae
- Genus: Folinella
- Species: F. excavata

Binomial name
- Folinella excavata (Philippi, 1836)

Synonyms
- Chrysallida (Ividella) excavata (Philippi, 1836); Chrysallida excavata (Philippi, 1836); Ividella excavata (Philippi, 1836); Odostomia (Miralda) excavata Philippi, 1836; Odostomia deshayesiana Recluz, 1843; Odostomia harveyi Thompson W, 1840; Odostomia trinodosa de Rayneval & Ponzi, 1854; Odostomia turrita Thorpe, 1844; Phosinella deshayesiana (Récluz, 1843); Rissoa deshayesiana Récluz, 1843; Rissoa excavata Philippi, 1836; Rissoa harveyi Thompson W., 1840; Rissoa trinodosa de Rayneval & Ponzi, 1854

= Folinella excavata =

Species of gastropod

Folinella excavata is a species of sea snail, a marine gastropod mollusk in the family Pyramidellidae, the pyrams and their allies.

== Description ==
The white shell is solid, opaque and rather glossy. Its length measures 3.75 mm. The teleoconch contains six whorls. The suture is broad and very deep. The shell shows prominent spiral ridges, of which there are three on the main part of the body whorl, and two slighter ones at the base, and two ridges on the spire whorls. They are crossed obliquely by sharp longitudinal ribs, extending to the base. Their intersections with the spiral sculpture appear nodulous. The columellar tooth is small and remote. The umbilicus is narrow but distinct.

== Distribution ==
This marine species occurs in the following locations:

- European waters (ERMS scope)
- Greek Exclusive Economic Zone
- Irish Exclusive economic Zone
- Portuguese Exclusive Economic Zone
- South West Coast of Apulia
- Spanish Exclusive Economic Zone
- United Kingdom Exclusive Economic Zone
