= Odetta (gastropod) =

Scientific classification
- Kingdom: Animalia
- Phylum: Mollusca
- Class: Gastropoda
- Family: Pyramidellidae
- Genus: Odetta; Folin, 1869

Type species
- Odetta sulcata (de Folin, 1870)

Genus of gastropods

Odetta is a genus of small sea snails, marine gastropod molluscs in the subfamily Odostomiinae, which is a voluminous taxon of minute marine gastropods with a heterostrophic protoconch.

== Taxonomy ==
According to Gary Rosenberg's Malacolog however, "Odetta" is not a valid genus name. It is considered to be an unavailable name, because it was published as a "nomen nudum". However, by including the type species in Megastomia, Peñas & Rolán (1999) implicitly treated Odetta as a synonym of Megastomia, contra van Aartsen, Gittenberger & Goud (1998) who hold it as a valid genus and are followed by the database WoRMS.

== Species ==
- Odetta appeliusi (Hornung & Mermod, 1924)
- Odetta bosyuensis (Nomura, 1937)
- Odetta dekleini van Aartsen, Gittenberger E. & Goud, 1998
- Odetta lirata (A. Adams, 1860)
- Odetta marci van Aartsen, Gittenberger & Goud, 1998
- Odetta sulcata (de Folin, 1870)
- Odetta tenpeii (Nomura, 1937)
- Odetta zekiergeni Öztürk, 2013

Species brought into synonymy

- Odetta digitalis (Dall & Bartsch, 1906): synonym of Leucotina digitalis (Dall & Bartsch, 1906): synonym of Monotygma amoena (A. Adams, 1853)
- Odetta felix (Dall & Bartsch, 1906): synonym of Oscilla felix (Dall & Bartsch, 1906)
- Odetta lectissima (Dall & Bartsch, 1906): synonym of Iolaea lectissima (Dall & Bartsch, 1906)
