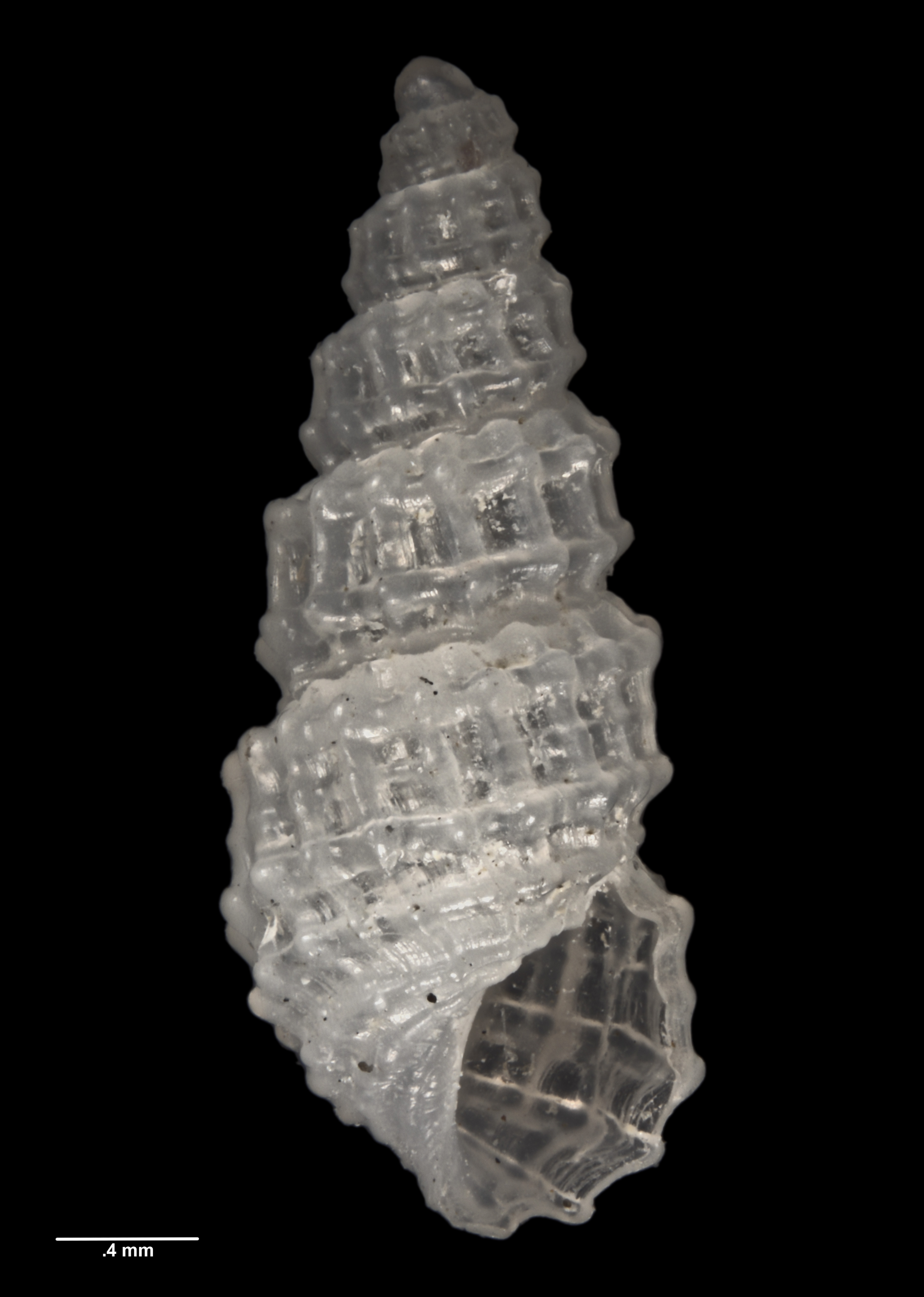
- Ividella maoria

Scientific classification
- Kingdom: Animalia
- Phylum: Mollusca
- Class: Gastropoda
- Family: Pyramidellidae
- Genus: Ividella; Dall & Bartsch, 1909

= Ividella =

Genus of gastropods

Ividella is a genus of sea snails, marine gastropod mollusks in the family Pyramidellidae, the pyrams and their allies.

== Species ==
Species within the genus Ividella include:

- Ividella abbotti (Olsson & McGinty, 1958)
- †Ividella guppyi Landau & LaFollette, 2015
- Ividella maoria Powell, 1940
- Ividella mariae (Bartsch, 1928)
- Ividella mendozae (Baker, Hanna & A. M. Strong, 1928)
- Ividella navisa (Dall & Bartsch, 1907)
- Ividella notabilis (C. B. Adams, 1852)
- Ividella quinquecincta (Carpenter, 1857)
- Ividella rhizophorae (Hertlein & A. M. Strong, 1951)
- Ividella ulloana (A. M. Strong, 1949)
