= Ividia havanensis =

Scientific classification
- Kingdom: Animalia
- Phylum: Mollusca
- Class: Gastropoda
- Family: Pyramidellidae
- Genus: Ividia
- Species: I. havanensis

Binomial name
- Ividia havanensis (Pilsbry & Aguayo, 1933)

Synonyms
- Miralda havanensis (Pilsbry & Aguayo, 1933); Odostomia havanensis Pilsbry & Aguayo, 1933

Species of gastropod

Ividia havanensis is a species of sea snail, a marine gastropod mollusk in the family Pyramidellidae, the pyrams and their allies.

== Description ==
The shell attains a length of 2 mm.

== Distribution ==
This species occurs in the following locations:

- Gulf of Mexico (Florida)
- Caribbean Sea (Colombia, Cuba, Virgin Islands)
- Atlantic Ocean (Northeast Brazil)
