= Ividella abbotti =

Scientific classification
- Kingdom: Animalia
- Phylum: Mollusca
- Class: Gastropoda
- Family: Pyramidellidae
- Genus: Ividella
- Species: I. abbotti

Binomial name
- Ividella abbotti (Olsson & McGinty, 1958)

Synonyms
- Miralda abbotti Olsson & McGinty, 1958

Species of gastropod

Ividella abbotti is a species of sea snail, a marine gastropod mollusk in the family Pyramidellidae, the pyrams and their allies.

== Description ==
The shell grows to a length of 2.6 mm.

== Distribution ==
This species occurs in the following locations:

- Caribbean Sea
- Colombia
- Costa Rica
- Gulf of Mexico
- Mexico
- Panama
