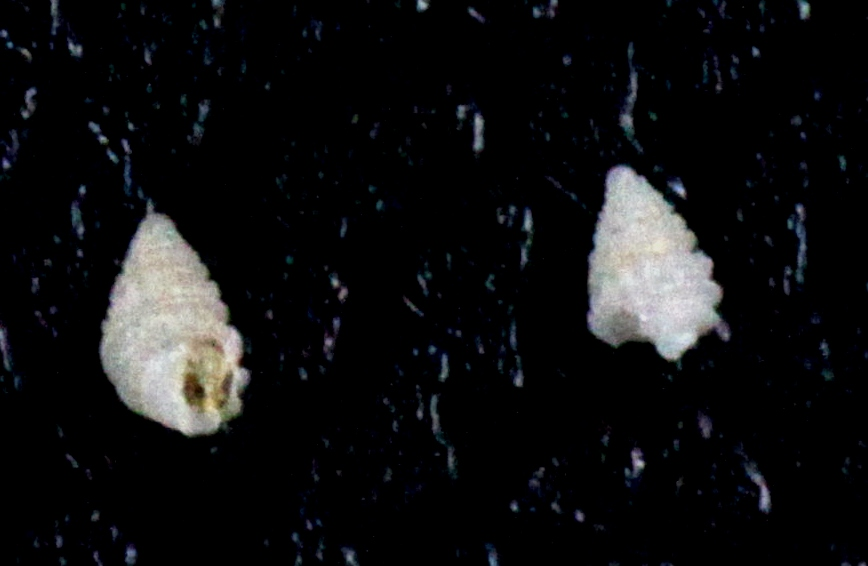

Scientific classification
- Kingdom: Animalia
- Phylum: Mollusca
- Class: Gastropoda
- Family: Pyramidellidae
- Genus: Ividia
- Species: I. aepynota

Binomial name
- Ividia aepynota (Dall & Bartsch, 1909)

Synonyms
- Miralda aepynota (Dall & Bartsch, 1909); Odostomia aepynota Dall & Bartsch, 1909

= Ividia aepynota =

Species of mollusk

Ividia aepynota is a species of sea snail, a marine gastropod mollusk in the family Pyramidellidae, the pyrams and their allies.

== Description ==
The pupiform shell is translucent. Its length measures 1 mm. The whorls of the protoconch are small, obliquely immersed in the first post-nuclear turns, marked by four spiral cords. The summits of the five whorls of the teleoconch are appressed. They are marked by two strong, spiral keels between the sutures, a third at the periphery, and a fourth on the middle of the base, the last two somewhat less strong than the rest. The posterior keel forms the strong tabulation at the summit of the whorls and is strongly tuberculated, 14 tubercles appearing upon the second and 20 upon the remaining whorls. The space between the keels is marked by rather strong lines of growth. The greatest convexity coincides at the superperipheral keel. The aperture is irregularly ovate and somewhat effuse anteriorly. The posterior angle is obtuse. The thin outer lip is angulated by the keels, showing the external markings within. The columella is strong, curved, without visible fold in the aperture. The shell is reinforced by the base. The parietal wall is covered by a thin callus.

== Distribution ==
This species occurs in the Pacific Ocean off California.

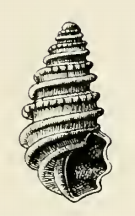
Apertural view of a shell of Ividia aepynota
