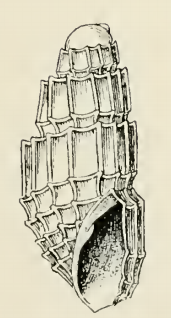
- Apertural view of the shell of Ividella quinquecincta

Scientific classification
- Kingdom: Animalia
- Phylum: Mollusca
- Class: Gastropoda
- Family: Pyramidellidae
- Genus: Ividella
- Species: I. quinquecincta

Binomial name
- Ividella quinquecincta (Carpenter, 1857)

Synonyms
- Folinella quinquecincta (Carpenter, 1857); Odostomia quinquecincta (Carpenter, 1857); Odostomia (Ividella) quinquecincta Carpenter, 1857; Odostomia (Parthenia) quinquecincta Carpenter, 1857 (basionym); Parthenia quinquecincta Carpenter, 1857 (original combination)

= Ividella quinquecincta =

Species of gastropod

Ividella quinquecincta is a species of sea snail, a marine gastropod mollusk in the family Pyramidellidae, the pyrams and their allies.

== Description ==
The shell has an elongate-ovate shape. Its length measures 1.8 mm. The whorls of the protoconch are tumid, obliquely immersed. The four whorls of the teleoconch are flattened, strongly tabulated, shouldered at the summit, and strongly contracted at the periphery. They are marked by strong lamellar ribs, of which 12 occur upon the first, 14 upon the second, and 16 upon the penultimate turn. In addition to the axial ribs, the whorls are marked by six strong spiral cords, one of which is at the angle of the shoulder and another at the periphery, the third falls a little anterior to the suture, while the other three divide the remainder of the base into four almost equal parts. The aperture is oval. The posterior angle is obtuse. The outer lip is thin, rendered angulated by the spiral cords. The columella is slender, curved, and somewdiat revolute. It is provided with an oblique fold at its insertion. The parietal wall is covered with a strong callus.

== Distribution ==
This species occurs in the Pacific Ocean off Mazatlán, Mexico
