= Hinemoa forticingulata =

Scientific classification
- Kingdom: Animalia
- Phylum: Mollusca
- Class: Gastropoda
- Family: Pyramidellidae
- Genus: Hinemoa
- Species: H. forticingulata

Binomial name
- Hinemoa forticingulata Bozzetti, 2008

Synonyms
- Miralda (Hinemoa) forticingulata (Bozzetti, 2008)

Species of gastropod

Hinemoa forticingulata is a species of sea snail, a marine gastropod mollusk in the family Pyramidellidae, the pyrams and their allies.

== Description ==
The shell grows to a length of 4 mm.

== Distribution ==
This species occurs in the Indian Ocean off Madagascar.
