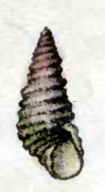
- Drawing of a shell of Oscilla ligata

Scientific classification
- Kingdom: Animalia
- Phylum: Mollusca
- Class: Gastropoda
- Family: Pyramidellidae
- Genus: Oscilla
- Species: O. ligata

Binomial name
- Oscilla ligata Angas, 1877

Synonyms
- Hinemoa ligata (Angas, 1877); Hinemoa rubra Laseron, 1959; Miralda ligata (Angas, 1877); Parthenia tasmanica Tenison-Woods, 1877; Pyramidella (Oscilla) ligata Angas, 1877 (basionym)

= Oscilla ligata =

Species of gastropod

Oscilla ligata is a species of sea snail, a marine gastropod mollusk in the family Pyramidellidae, the pyrams and their allies.

== Description ==
The rather thin shell has a rosy-white color and measures 2 mm. The six whorls of the teleoconch have prominent spiral ribs. The outer lip is simple. The columella has a small transverse plait.

== Distribution ==
This marine species occurs off New South Wales, Australia.
