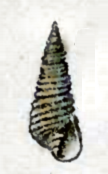
- Drawing of a shell of Oscilla annulata

Scientific classification
- Kingdom: Animalia
- Phylum: Mollusca
- Class: Gastropoda
- Family: Pyramidellidae
- Genus: Oscilla
- Species: O. annulata

Binomial name
- Oscilla annulata (A. Adams 1855)

Synonyms
- Miralda annulata (A. Adams, 1854); Pyramidella (Oscilla) annulata A. Adams 1855 (basionym)

= Oscilla annulata =

Species of gastropod

Oscilla annulata is a species of sea snail, a marine gastropod mollusk in the family Pyramidellidae, the pyrams and their allies.

== Description ==
The length of the whitish shell measures 5 mm. The numerous whorls of the teleoconch are flattened, and spirally ribbed. Their interstices are longitudinally striated. The columella has a single posterior plication. The lip is subcrenulated, the interior lirate.

== Distribution ==
This marine species occurs in the demersal zone off the Philippines, Singapore and Japan.
