= Iolaea scitula =

Iole scitula

Scientific classification
- Kingdom: Animalia
- Phylum: Mollusca
- Class: Gastropoda
- Family: Pyramidellidae
- Genus: Iolaea
- Species: I. scitula

Binomial name
- Iolaea scitula (A. Adams, 1860)

Synonyms
- Iolea scitula A. Adams, 1860 (preoccupied genus name); Turbonilla scitula (A. Adams, 1860)

Species of gastropod

Iolaea scitula is a species of sea snail, a marine gastropod mollusk in the family Pyramidellidae, the pyrams and their allies.

== Description ==
The shell size varies between 1.5 mm and 4 mm.

== Distribution ==
This marine species occurs off China, New Caledonia and the Solomon Islands.
