= Odostomia azteca =

Scientific classification
- Kingdom: Animalia
- Phylum: Mollusca
- Class: Gastropoda
- Family: Pyramidellidae
- Genus: Odostomia
- Species: O. azteca

Binomial name
- Odostomia azteca Strong & Hertlein, 1939

Synonyms
- Miralda azteca (Strong & Hertlein, 1939)

Species of gastropod

Odostomia azteca is a species of sea snail, a marine gastropod mollusc in the family Pyramidellidae, the pyrams and their allies.

== Distribution ==
This species is distributed in the Pacific Ocean off Central Americas.
