= Odetta bosyuensis =

Scientific classification
- Kingdom: Animalia
- Phylum: Mollusca
- Class: Gastropoda
- Family: Pyramidellidae
- Genus: Odetta
- Species: O. bosyuensis

Binomial name
- Odetta bosyuensis (Nomura, 1937)

Synonyms
- Oscilla bosyuensis (Nomura, 1937)

Species of gastropod

Odetta bosyuensis is a species of sea snail, a marine gastropod mollusk in the family Pyramidellidae, the pyrams and their allies.

== Distribution ==
This marine species occurs in the benthic zone off the Philippines, Korea, Japan.
