= Iolaea neofelixoides =

Scientific classification
- Kingdom: Animalia
- Phylum: Mollusca
- Class: Gastropoda
- Family: Pyramidellidae
- Genus: Iolaea
- Species: I. neofelixoides

Binomial name
- Iolaea neofelixoides (Nomura, 1936)

Species of gastropod

Iolaea neofelixoides is a species of sea snail, a marine gastropod mollusk in the family Pyramidellidae, the pyrams and their allies.

== Distribution ==
This species occurs in the following locations:

- European waters (ERMS scope)
- Mediterranean Sea
