= Oscilla punicea =

Scientific classification
- Kingdom: Animalia
- Phylum: Mollusca
- Class: Gastropoda
- Family: Pyramidellidae
- Genus: Oscilla
- Species: O. punicea

Binomial name
- Oscilla punicea (W. R. B. Oliver, 1915)

Synonyms
- Hinemoa punicea W. R. B. Oliver, 1915

Species of gastropod

Oscilla punicea is a species of sea snail, a marine gastropod mollusk in the family Pyramidellidae, the pyrams and their allies.
