= Iolaea robertsoni =

Scientific classification
- Kingdom: Animalia
- Phylum: Mollusca
- Class: Gastropoda
- Family: Pyramidellidae
- Genus: Iolaea
- Species: I. robertsoni

Binomial name
- Iolaea robertsoni (van Regteren Altena, 1975)

Synonyms
- Folinella robertsoni (van Regteren Altena, 1975); Ividia robertsoni (van Regteren Altena, 1975); Miralda robertsoni van Regteren Altena, 1975

Species of gastropod

Iolaea robertsoni is a species of sea snail, a marine gastropod mollusk in the family Pyramidellidae, the pyrams and their allies.

== Description ==
The shell grows to a length of 2.1 mm.

== Distribution ==
This species occurs in the Atlantic Ocean off Northeast Brazil.
