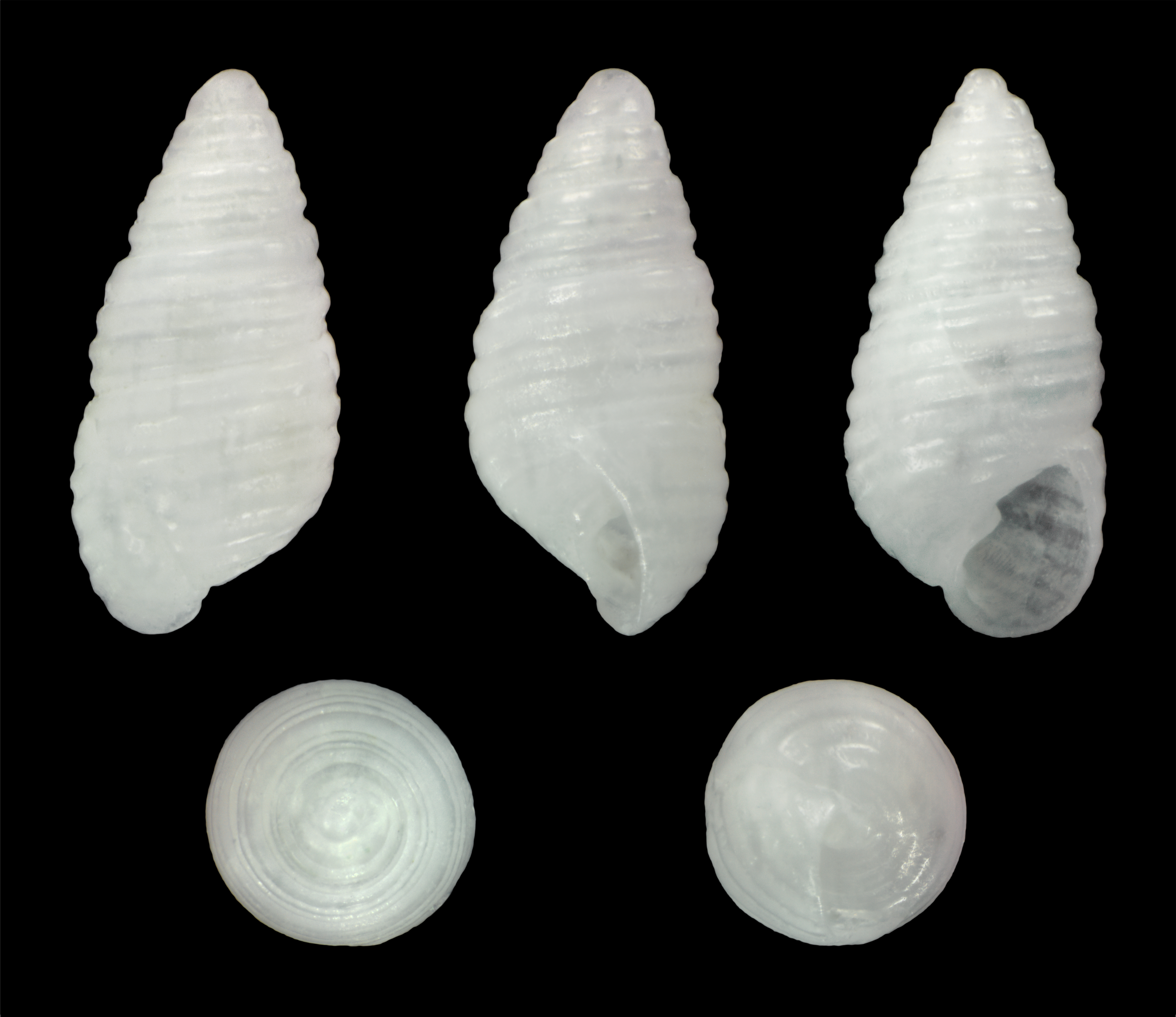

Scientific classification
- Kingdom: Animalia
- Phylum: Mollusca
- Class: Gastropoda
- Family: Pyramidellidae
- Genus: Hinemoa
- Species: H. indica

Binomial name
- Hinemoa indica (Melvill, 1896)

Synonyms
- Miralda pupu Pilsbry, 1918: Odostomia pupu Pilsbry, 1918

= Hinemoa indica =

Species of gastropod

Hinemoa indica is a species of sea snail, a marine gastropod mollusk in the family Pyramidellidae, the pyrams and their allies.
