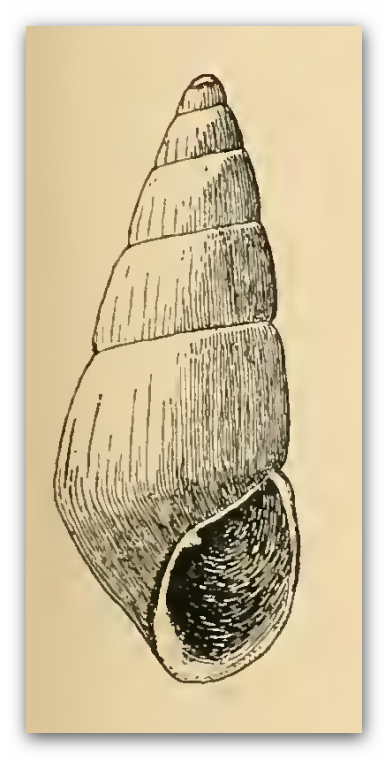
- Apertural view of a shell of Odostomia limpida

Scientific classification
- Kingdom: Animalia
- Phylum: Mollusca
- Class: Gastropoda
- Family: Pyramidellidae
- Genus: Odostomia
- Species: O. limpida

Binomial name
- Odostomia limpida Dall & Bartsch, 1906

Synonyms
- Odostomia (Odostomia) limpida Dall & Bartsch, 1906

= Odostomia limpida =

Species of gastropod

Odostomia limpida is a species of small sea snail, a marine gastropod mollusc or micromollusk in the family Pyramidellidae, the pyrams and their allies.

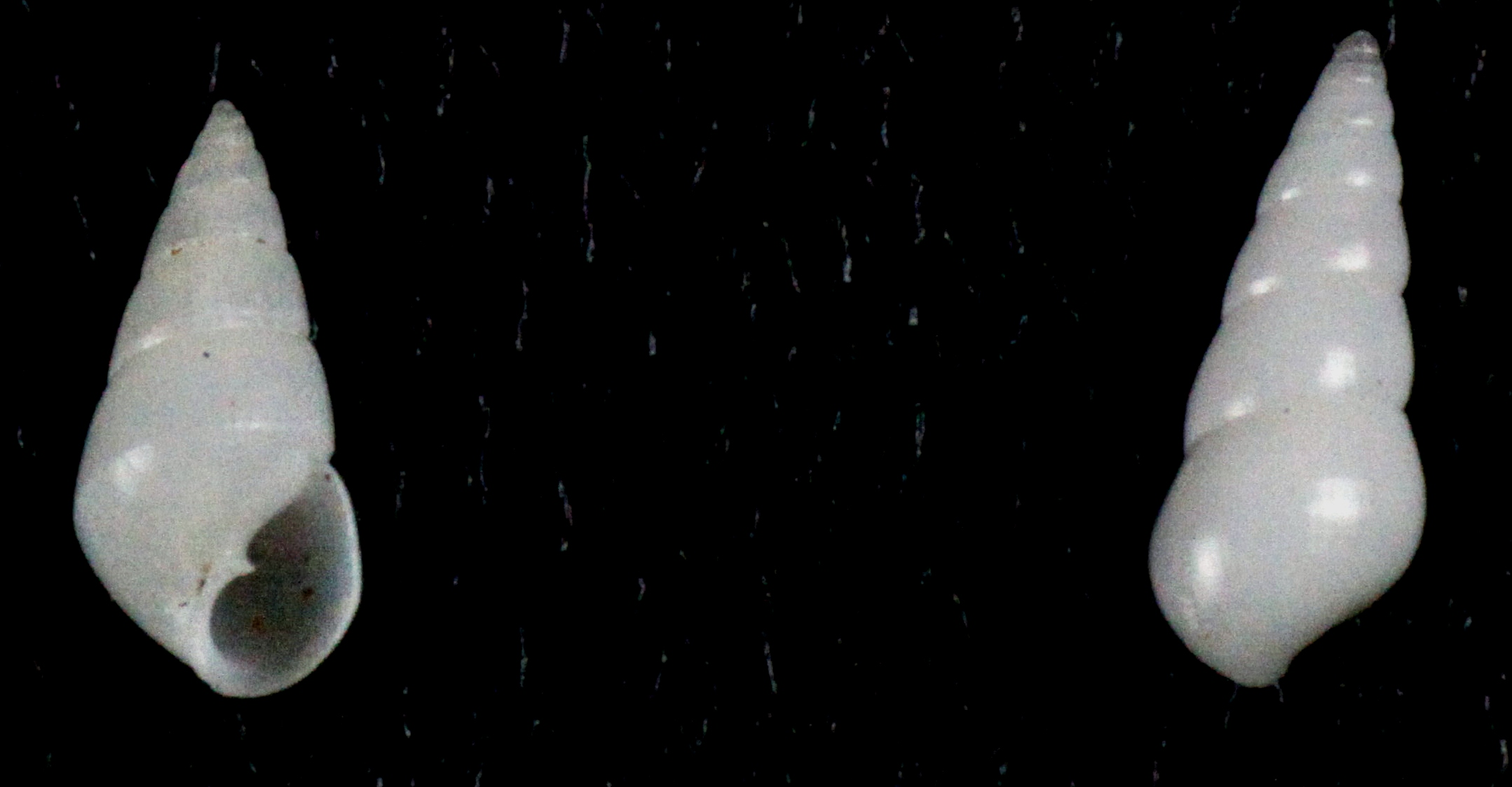
Two shells of Odostomia limpida

== Description ==
The slender shell is elongate-conic, semitranslucent and shining. It measures 3.6 mm. The nuclear whorls are moderately large, almost completely obliquely immersed in the first of the succeeding whorls; the peripheral edge only of the last volution is visible above this. The six post-nuclear whorls are situated rather high between the sutures, slightly rounded (almost flattened), faintly shouldered at the summit, apparently without axial or spiral sculpture. The whorls are feebly angulated at the periphery, and the summits of succeeding turns fall a little anterior to it, which renders the sutures well impressed. The base of the body whorl is large, rounded, very narrowly umbilicated. The aperture is large, subovate, somewhat produced at the junction of the outer lip and columella. The posterior angle is acute. The outer lip is thin. The columella slender, decidedly curved and somewhat revolute, provided with a prominent lamellar fold at its insertion. The parietal wall is covered by a thin callus.

== Distribution ==
This species occurs in the Pacific Ocean off Japan and Vietnam.
