= Herviera =

Scientific classification
- Kingdom: Animalia
- Phylum: Mollusca
- Class: Gastropoda
- Family: Pyramidellidae
- Genus: Herviera; Melvill & Standen, 1899

Genus of gastropods

Herviera is a genus of sea snails, marine gastropod mollusks in the family Pyramidellidae, the pyrams and their allies.

== Species ==
Species within the genus Herviera include:

- Herviera gliriella (Melvill & Standen, 1896)
- Herviera isidella (Melvill & Standen, 1898)
- Herviera patricia (Pilsbry, 1918)
