= Herviera isidella =

Scientific classification
- Kingdom: Animalia
- Phylum: Mollusca
- Class: Gastropoda
- Family: Pyramidellidae
- Genus: Herviera
- Species: H. isidella

Binomial name
- Herviera isidella (Melvill & Standen, 1898)

Species of gastropod

Herviera isidella is a species of sea snail, a marine gastropod mollusk in the family Pyramidellidae, the pyrams and their allies.
