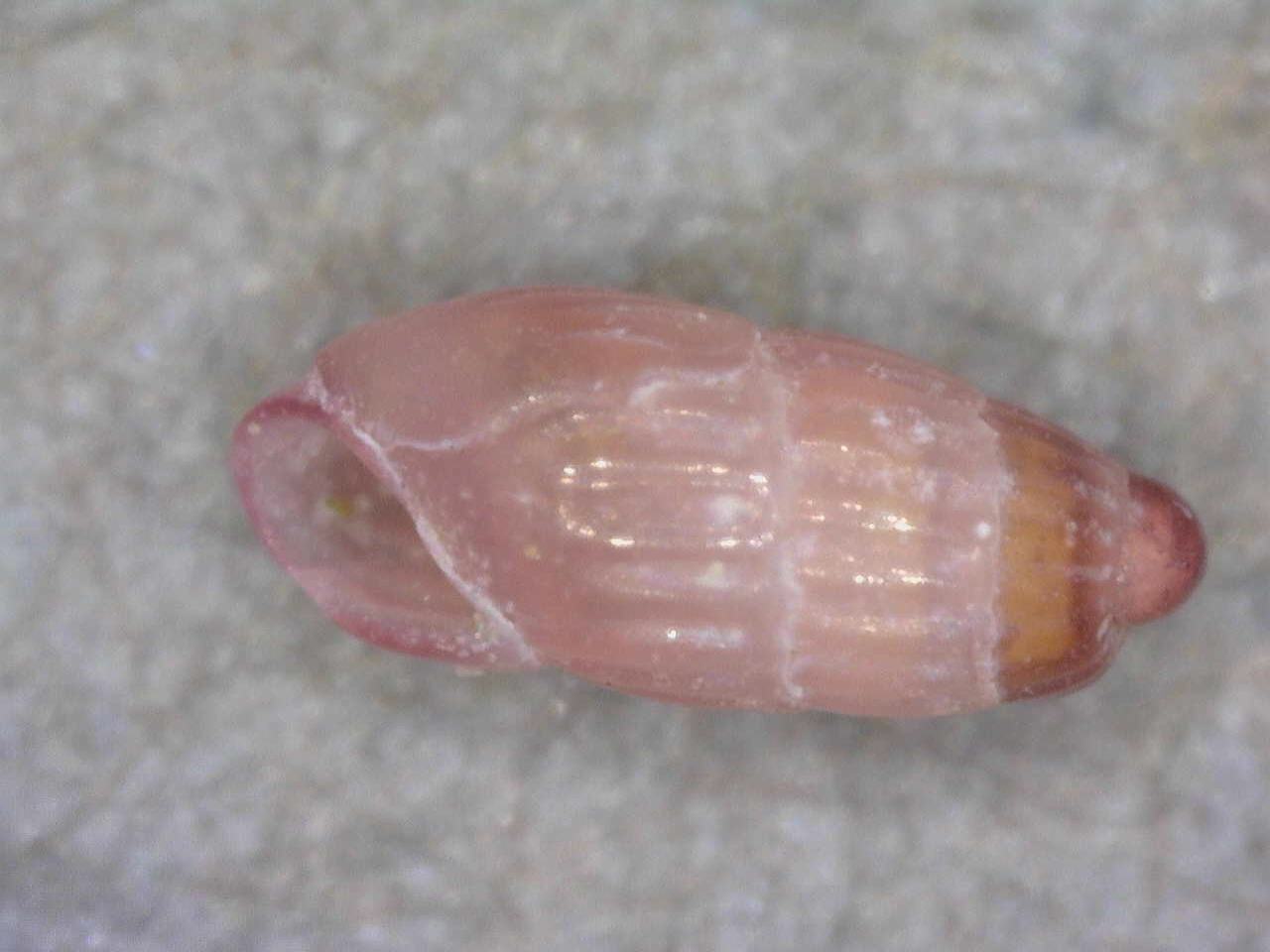

Scientific classification
- Kingdom: Animalia
- Phylum: Mollusca
- Class: Gastropoda
- Family: Pyramidellidae
- Genus: Herviera
- Species: H. gliriella

Binomial name
- Herviera gliriella (Melvill & Standen, 1896)

Synonyms
- Pyrgulina gliriella Melvill & Standen, 1896

= Herviera gliriella =

Species of gastropod

Herviera gliriella is a species of sea snail, a marine gastropod mollusc in the family Pyramidellidae, the pyrams and their allies.

== Description ==
The ovate shell is light brown with darker brown color at the apex and at the base. Its length measures 2.5 mm. The five whorls of the teleoconch show prominent axial ribs that increase gradually in size at the transition between the protoconch and teleoconch. The live animal is cream-colored with white flecks.

== Distribution ==
This species occurs in shallow waters (less than 200 m deep) in the Indian Ocean off East Africa and also in the Eastern Pacific Ocean, off Hawaii and off the Galapagos Islands.
