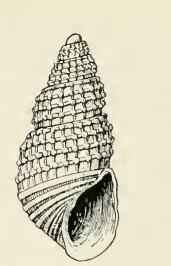
- Apertural view of the shell of Odostomia cooperi

Scientific classification
- Kingdom: Animalia
- Phylum: Mollusca
- Class: Gastropoda
- Family: Pyramidellidae
- Genus: Odostomia
- Species: O. cooperi

Binomial name
- Odostomia cooperi Dall & Bartsch, 1907

Synonyms
- Odostomia (Chrysallida) cooperi Dall & Bartsch, 1907

= Odostomia cooperi =

Species of gastropod

Odostomia cooperi is a species of sea snail, a marine gastropod mollusk in the family Pyramidellidae, the pyrams and their allies.

According to the Integrated Taxonomic Information System (ITIS), Odostomia cooperi is a synonym of Odostomia astricta Dall and Bartsch, 1907

== Description ==
The white shell has a broadly conic shape. Its length measures 3.1 mm. The whorls of the protoconch are smooth, largely obliquely immersed in the first of the succeeding turns above, which only about half of the last turn projects. The five whorls of the teleoconch are moderately rounded, slopingly shouldered at the summit.

The shoulder bears the first of the four stronger tuberculate spiral ridges. Connections that join the tubercles in the spiral series are a little more strongly developed than those that link them vertically—the spaces enclosed between them being deep squarish pits. The tubercles are very prominent and rounded; there are about 16 upon the second, 20 upon the third, and 26 upon the penultimate turn.

The axial series slants retractively from the posterior suture. The sutures are deep and broad, considerably wider than the spaces between the keels. The periphery of the body whorl is deeply channeled, the channel marked by a weak extension of the axial bars that terminate at the first supraperipheral keel.

The base of the shell is prolonged, well-rounded. It is marked by seven strong moderately raised spiral keels that, like the channels that separate them, diminish regularly in width from the periphery to the umbilical area; the last, the eighth, immediately behind the columella, being less distinct and considerably broader than the rest.

The channels between the keels are about equal to the keels in width and are crossed by numerous very slender raised threads, which extend up on the sides of the keels but do not cross them. About five of these threads fall in the space between two tubercles on the spire, in the first supra-peripheral groove.

The oval aperture is large, effuse anteriorly. The posterior angle is obtuse. The outer lip is rather thick, not showing the external sculpture within. The columella is somewhat twisted, revolute anteriorly, re-enforced by the attenuated base, and provided with a weak fold at its insertion. The parietal wall is covered by a callus—which joins the columella with the posterior angle of the aperture and renders the periostracum almost complete.

== Distribution ==
The type specimen was found in the Pacific Ocean off Monterey, California.
