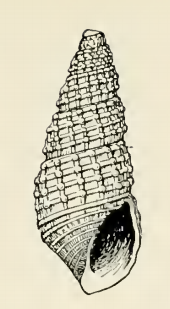
- Apertural view of the shell of Odostomia astricta

Scientific classification
- Kingdom: Animalia
- Phylum: Mollusca
- Class: Gastropoda
- Family: Pyramidellidae
- Genus: Odostomia
- Species: O. astricta

Binomial name
- Odostomia astricta Dall & Bartsch, 1907

Synonyms
- Chrysallida astricta Dall & Bartsch, 1907; Odostomia (Chrysallida) astricta Dall & Bartsch, 1907; Odostomia (Chrysallida) montereyensis Dall & Bartsch, 1907

= Odostomia astricta =

Species of gastropod

Odostomia astricta is a species of sea snail, a marine gastropod mollusc in the family Pyramidellidae, the pyrams and their allies.

== Description ==
The elongate-conic shell is bluish-white. It measures 2.9 mm. The whorls of the protoconch are decollated. The seven whorls of the teleoconch are very slightly rounded, separated by deeply channeled sutures. In this species the axial ribs exceed the four spiral keels in strength, their junction forming elongated tubercles the long axis of which coincides with the spiral keels. The axial ribs, of which there are 16 upon all of the turns, slant decidedly backward near the aperture. They are rather distantly spaced and the spaces enclosed between them and the spiral keels are deep oblong pits, the long axis of which coincides with the spiral sculpture. The periphery of the body whorl is marked by a deep, wide channel across which the ribs extend feebly to the first subperipheral keel. The base of the shell is rather long and well rounded, marked by seven rather narrow, slender spiral keels which successively decrease in strength from the periphery to the umbilical area, the anterior ones being only faintly indicated. The spaces which separate the keels are about twice as wide as the keels and are crossed by many slender raised axial threads. The aperture is oval. The outer lip is rather thick. The columella is twisted, reinforced by the attenuated base and provided with a moderately strong fold at its insertion. The parietal wall is covered by a strong callus.

== Distribution ==
This species occurs in the Pacific Ocean off California.
