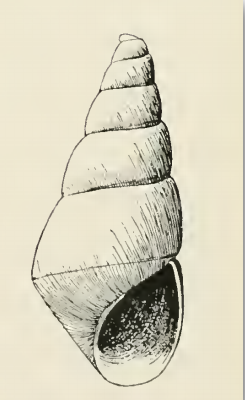
- Apertural view of a shell of Odostomia raymondi

Scientific classification
- Kingdom: Animalia
- Phylum: Mollusca
- Class: Gastropoda
- Family: Pyramidellidae
- Genus: Odostomia
- Species: O. raymondi

Binomial name
- Odostomia raymondi Dall & Bartsch, 1909

Synonyms
- Evalea raymondi (Dall & Bartsch, 1909); Odostomia (Evalea) minutissima Dall & Bartsch, 1909; Odostomia (Evalea) raymondi Dall & Bartsch, 1909

= Odostomia raymondi =

Species of gastropod

Odostomia raymondi is a species of sea snail, a marine gastropod mollusc in the family Pyramidellidae, the pyrams and their allies.

== Description ==
The milk-white shell has a regularly conic shape. Its length measures 3.6 mm. The whorls of the protoconch are very obliquely deeply immersed in the first of the succeeding turns, above which only the tilted edge of the last volution projects, which gives the spire a decidedly truncated aspect. The six whorls of the teleoconch are well rounded, slightly shouldered at the summit. They are marked by a raised spiral thread at the decidedly angulated periphery. The summits of the whorls fall a little anterior to the periphery, and cause the sutures to appear subchanneled. The base of the shell is short and well rounded. The entire surface of base and spire are marked by strongly retractive lines of growth and numerous closely spaced spiral striations. The aperture is oval. The posterior angle is acute. The outer lip is thin. The columella is curved, reflected, reinforced by the base and provided with a moderately strong fold at its insertion.

== Distribution ==
This species occurs in the Pacific Ocean off Catalina Island, California.
