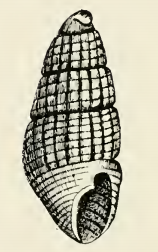
- Apertural view of the shell of Odostomia proxima

Scientific classification
- Kingdom: Animalia
- Phylum: Mollusca
- Class: Gastropoda
- Family: Pyramidellidae
- Genus: Odostomia
- Species: O. proxima

Binomial name
- Odostomia proxima (de Folin, 1872)

Synonyms
- Odostomia (Chrysallida) proxima (de Folin, 1872); Noevila proxima de Folin, 1872 (basionym)

= Odostomia proxima =

Species of gastropod

Odostomia proxima is a species of sea snail, a marine gastropod mollusc in the family Pyramidellidae, the pyrams and their allies.

== Description ==
The crystalline shell has an ovate, conic, shape. Its length measures 2.5 mm. The 1½ whorls of the protoconch are obliquely immersed in the first of the succeeding turns. The four whorls of the teleoconch are strongly constricted at the sutures, and moderately shouldered at the summit. They are marked by strong vertical axial ribs, of which 20 occur upon the second and third and 22 upon the penultimate turn. These ribs disappear at the periphery. The spaces between the ribs are marked by spiral cords a little less strong than the ribs; four of these occur between the sutures on the second and third, and seven upon the penultimate turn. Their intersections with the ribs form nodules. The sutures are channeled. The base of the shell is somewhat attenuated. It is marked by eleven spiral cords, the spaces between which are axially lirate. The aperture is almost pear-shaped. The posterior angle is obtuse. The outer lip is thin, showing the external sculpture within. The columella is slender, somewhat curved and reflected, and provided with a strong fold at its insertion. The parietal wall is covered with a thin callus.

== Distribution ==
This species occurs in the Pacific Ocean off Margarita Island, Bay of Panama.
