= Odostomia recta =

Scientific classification
- Kingdom: Animalia
- Phylum: Mollusca
- Class: Gastropoda
- Family: Pyramidellidae
- Genus: Odostomia
- Species: O. recta

Binomial name
- Odostomia recta (de Folin, 1872)

Synonyms
- Menestho recta (de Folin, 1872); Odetta recta de Folin, 1872 (basionym); Odostomia (Menestho) recta (de Folin, 1872)

Species of gastropod

Odostomia recta is a species of sea snail, a marine gastropod mollusc in the family Pyramidellidae, the pyrams and their allies.

== Description ==
The robust shell is conic, ventricose, subcrystalline and has a straight spire. Its length measures 2.2 mm. The three whorls of the protoconch form an acute apex, having their axis at right angles to that of the succeeding turn. The four whorls of the teleoconch are marked by three broad, strong, somewhat rounded, spiral keels between the sutures, the spaces between which are less wide than the keels. The sutures are ill defined. The body whorl is almost equal to half the length of the shell. The base of the shell is marked by less developed spiral cords. The aperture is oval. The columella is provided with a strong fold.

There is no image as the type species was crushed by de Folin, while being drawn.

== Distribution ==
This species occurs in the Pacific Ocean off Margarita Island, Bay of Panama.
