= Odostomia citrina =

Scientific classification
- Kingdom: Animalia
- Phylum: Mollusca
- Class: Gastropoda
- Family: Pyramidellidae
- Genus: Odostomia
- Species: O. citrina

Binomial name
- Odostomia citrina de Folin, 1869

Species of gastropod

Odostomia citrina is a species of sea snail, a marine gastropod mollusk in the family Pyramidellidae, the pyrams and their allies.

== Description ==
The shell grows to a length of 2 mm.

== Distribution ==
This species occurs in the following locations:

- Cape Verde
