= Nesiodostomia =

Scientific classification
- Kingdom: Animalia
- Phylum: Mollusca
- Class: Gastropoda
- Family: Pyramidellidae
- Genus: Nesiodostomia; Pilsbry, 1918

Type species
- Odostomia prima Pilsbry, 1918

Genus of gastropods

Nesiodostomia is a genus of sea snails, marine gastropod mollusks in the family Pyramidellidae, the pyrams and their allies.

== Species ==
Species within the genus Nesiodostomia include:

- Nesiodostomia montforti Corgan, 1972
- Nesiodostomia quarta (Pilsbry, 1918)
- Nesiodostomia tertia (Pilsbry, 1918)

The following species were brought into synonymy:

- Nesiodostomia quinta (Pilsbry, 1944) accepted as Nesiodostomia tertia (Pilsbry, 1918)
