= Nesiodostomia quarta =

Scientific classification
- Kingdom: Animalia
- Phylum: Mollusca
- Class: Gastropoda
- Family: Pyramidellidae
- Genus: Nesiodostomia
- Species: N. quarta

Binomial name
- Nesiodostomia quarta (Pilsbry, 1918)

Synonyms
- Odostomia quarta Pilsbry, 1918

Species of gastropod

Nesiodostomia quarta is a species of sea snail, a marine gastropod mollusk in the family Pyramidellidae, the pyrams and their allies.

== Description ==
The cylindric shell is tapering towards its apex. Its length measures 3.4 mm. The smooth and glossy shell has a cinnamon color. The protoconch is large and hemispherical. The 5½ whorls of the teleoconch are nearly flat. The sutures are narrowly impressed. The subsutural margin is defined by an indistinct line in the color of the shell. The body whorl is tapering below. The aperture is almost shaped like a pear. The columella is very short and concave. The outer lip is tapering outward in the middle.

== Distribution ==
This species occurs in the Pacific Ocean off Hawaii.
