= Nesiodostomia tertia =

Scientific classification
- Kingdom: Animalia
- Phylum: Mollusca
- Class: Gastropoda
- Family: Pyramidellidae
- Genus: Nesiodostomia
- Species: N. tertia

Binomial name
- Nesiodostomia tertia (Pilsbry, 1918)

Synonyms
- Nesiodostomia quinta (Pilsbry, 1944); Odostomia prima Pilsbry, 1918; Odostomia quinta Pilsbry, 1918

Species of gastropod

Nesiodostomia tertia is a species of sea snail, a marine gastropod mollusk in the family Pyramidellidae, the pyrams and their allies.
