= Nesiodostomia montforti =

Scientific classification
- Kingdom: Animalia
- Phylum: Mollusca
- Class: Gastropoda
- Family: Pyramidellidae
- Genus: Nesiodostomia
- Species: N. montforti

Binomial name
- Nesiodostomia montforti Corgan, 1972

Synonyms
- Odostomia secunda Pilsbry, 1918

Species of gastropod

Nesiodostomia montforti is a species of sea snail, a marine gastropod mollusk in the family Pyramidellidae, the pyrams and their allies.

Nesiodostomia montforti as a replacement name for Odostomia secunda, itself a synonym of Eulimella secunda (Pilsbry, 1918)
