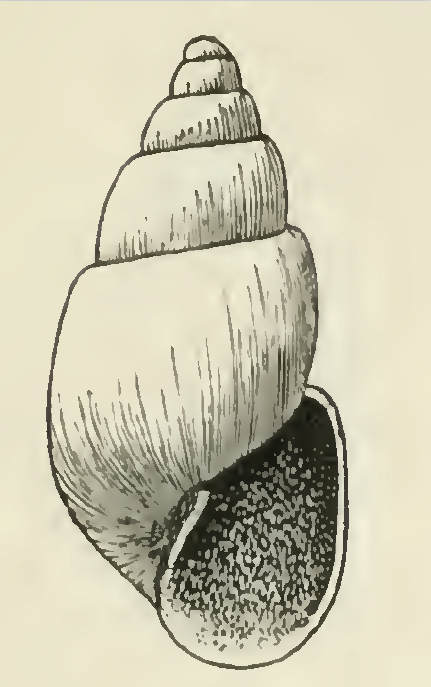
- Drawing of a shell of Odostomia vancouverensis

Scientific classification
- Kingdom: Animalia
- Phylum: Mollusca
- Class: Gastropoda
- Family: Pyramidellidae
- Genus: Odostomia
- Species: O. vancouverensis

Binomial name
- Odostomia vancouverensis Dall & Bartsch, 1910

Synonyms
- Evalea vancouverensis (Dall & Bartsch, 1910); Odostomia (Evalea) vancouverensis Dall & Bartsch, 1910

= Odostomia vancouverensis =

Species of gastropod

Odostomia vancouverensis is a species of sea snail, a marine gastropod mollusc in the family Pyramidellidae, the pyrams and their allies.

== Description ==
The yellowish-white shell has an elongate-ovate shape. Its length measures 4.7 mm. It is very narrowly umbilicated, and turreted. The whorls of the protoconch are small, obliquely immersed in the first of the succeeding turns, above which only half of the last volution projects and extends beyond the outline of the spire. The five whorls of the teleoconch are broadly, tabulatedly shouldered at the summit, and moderately rounded. They are marked by almost vertical lines of growth and numerous exceedingly fine spiral striations. The sutures are rendered very conspicuous by the tabulated shoulder. The periphery of the body whorl is well rounded. The base of the shell is moderately long, well rounded, and marked like the spire. The aperture is large, elongate-ovate, and somewhat effuse anteriorly. The posterior angle is decidedly obtuse. The outer lip is thin. The inner lip is slender, oblique, and somewhat revolute. It is provided with an oblique fold a little anterior to its insertion. The parietal wall is glazed with a thin callus.

== Distribution ==
The type specimens were found in the Pacific Ocean off Vancouver Island, British Columbia.
