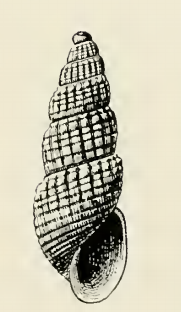
- Original image of a shell of Odostomia virginalis

Scientific classification
- Kingdom: Animalia
- Phylum: Mollusca
- Class: Gastropoda
- Family: Pyramidellidae
- Genus: Odostomia
- Species: O. virginalis

Binomial name
- Odostomia virginalis Dall & Bartsch, 1909

Synonyms
- Chrysallida virginalis (Dall & Bartsch, 1909); Evalea gracilienta (Carpenter); Odostomia (Chrysallida) virginalis Dall & Bartsch, 1909

= Odostomia virginalis =

Species of mollusc

Odostomia virginalis is a species of sea snail, a marine gastropod mollusc in the family Pyramidellidae, the pyrams and their allies.

== Description ==
The thin, semitranslucent shell has an elongate-conic shape. Its length measures 3 mm. The whorls of the protoconch are obliquely immersed in the first of the succeeding turns, above which only the tilted edge of the last volution projects, which is marked by three strongly elevated spiral threads. The six whorls of the protoconch are well-rounded, moderately contracted at the sutures, and strongly slopingly shouldered. They are marked by weak rounded axial ribs which are best developed near the edges of the shoulder. Of these ribs about 24 are indicated on the. first turn, 18 upon the second to fourth, and 20 upon the penultimate turn. In addition to the axial sculpture the whorls are marked between the sutures by a number of spiral keels of diverse strength, of which 4 occur upon the first and second, 5 upon the third, 6 upon the fourth and the penultimate whorl. Of these spiral ridges the second one below the summit is the strongest and marks the angle of the shoulder. The junction of the ribs and cords form feeble nodules best shown at the shoulder. The sutures are strongly constricted. The periphery of the body whorl is marked by a low cord. The base of the shell is well rounded. It is marked by four low, broad cords and seven exceedingly fine incised lines, the latter about the umbilical area. The narrow, strongly incised grooves which separate the cords are crossed by numerous fine axial threads, which give them a pitted appearance. The aperture is oval, and slightly effuse anteriorly. The posterior angle is acute;. The thin outer lip is rendered slightly wavy by the external cords. It shows the external sculpture within. The columella is slender, curved, and provided with a deep-seated fold at its insertion.

== Distribution ==
The type specimen was found in the Pacific Ocean off Todos Santos Bay, California.
