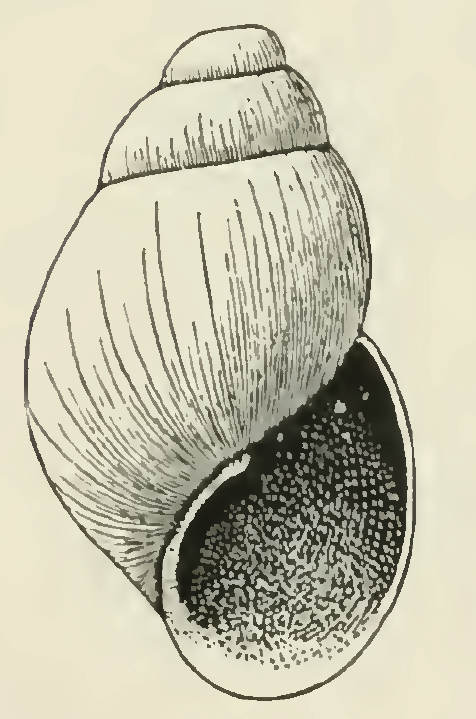
- Apertural view of Odostomia cookeana

Scientific classification
- Kingdom: Animalia
- Phylum: Mollusca
- Class: Gastropoda
- Family: Pyramidellidae
- Genus: Odostomia
- Species: O. cookeana

Binomial name
- Odostomia cookeana Bartsch, 1910

= Odostomia cookeana =

Species of gastropod

Odostomia cookeana is a species of sea snail, a marine gastropod mollusc in the family Pyramidellidae, the pyrams and their allies.

The epithet in this species refers to Mss J. M. Cooke, of San Diego,

== Description ==
The shell is elongate-ovate, very narrowly umbilicated, yellowish-white. It measures 3.2 mm. The nuclear whorls are very obliquely immersed in the first of the succeeding turns. The four post-nuclear whorls are very high between the sutures where they are very moderately rounded. They are marked by rather strong incremental lines and very numerous fine spiral striations. The periphery and the base of the body whorl are somewhat inflated, the latter strongly rounded and marked like the spire. The oval aperture is large. The posterior angle is acute. The outer lip is thin. The inner lipis decidedly oblique, quite strongly curved in the middle and somewhat reflected. It is provided with an oblique fold at its insertion, which is strong within and tapers to a vanishing point at the free edge of the columella. The parietal wall glazed with a thin callus.

== Distribution ==
This species occurs in the Pacific Ocean off Alaska.
