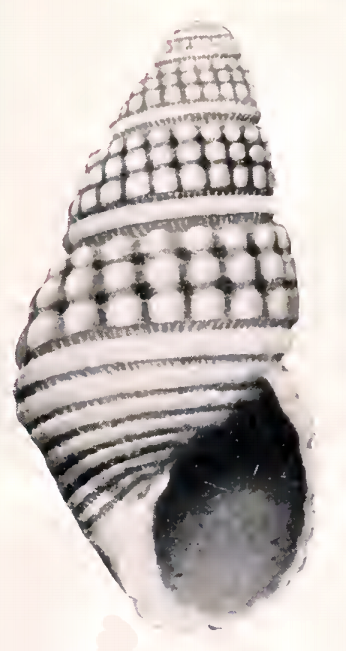
- Drawing of a shell of Odostomia fia

Scientific classification
- Kingdom: Animalia
- Phylum: Mollusca
- Class: Gastropoda
- Family: Pyramidellidae
- Genus: Odostomia
- Species: O. fia

Binomial name
- Odostomia fia Bartsch, 1927

Synonyms
- Odostomia (Chrysallida) fia Bartsch, 1927

= Odostomia fia =

Species of gastropod

Odostomia fia is a species of sea snail, a marine gastropod mollusc in the family Pyramidellidae, the pyrams and their allies.

== Description ==
The length of this yellow shell measures 3 mm. Its shape is elongate-ovate. The whorls of the protoconch are immersed in the first whorl of the teleoconch. The teleoconch contains 4½ moderately rounded whorls. They are shouldered at their summit and constricted at their sutures, which are deeply channeled. These whorls show three tuberculated spiral ridges and a smooth fourth ridge between their summit and the suture. Across these ridges lay slanting axial ribs: 18 on the second turn, 20 upon the third and 18 upon the penultimate turn. The junction of the ridges and the ribs form strong nodules. The spaces between them form rounded pits. The body whorl has a rounded periphery. Its base is strongly rounded and shows six strong spiral cords that diminish from the periphery to the tip of the base of the shell. These cords are crossed by numerous fine threadlike axial riblets. The large aperture is effuse anteriorly. The posterior angle is obtuse. The outer lip is rendered sinuous by the external sculpture. The reflected inner lip is appressed to the base of the shell for almost its entire length. It has a rather strong fold at its insertion. The parietal wall is covered with a thin callus.

== Distribution ==
The type specimen was found in the Pacific Ocean off Todos Santos Bay, California.
