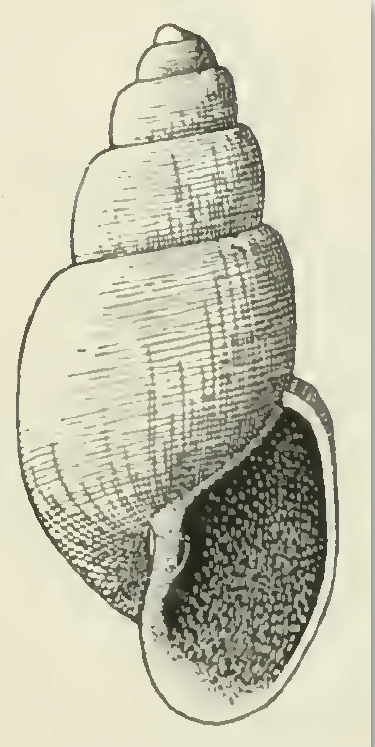
- Apertural view of Odostomia calliope

Scientific classification
- Kingdom: Animalia
- Phylum: Mollusca
- Class: Gastropoda
- Family: Pyramidellidae
- Genus: Odostomia
- Species: O. calliope

Binomial name
- Odostomia calliope Bartsch, 1912

Synonyms
- Evalea calliope Bartsch, 1912; Odostomia (Evalea) calliope Bartsch, 1912

= Odostomia calliope =

Species of gastropod

Odostomia calliope is a species of sea snail, a marine gastropod mollusc in the family Pyramidellidae, the pyrams and their allies.

== Description ==
The elongate-ovate shell is turreted, narrowly umbilicated, and creamy-white. The nuclear whorls are small, obliquely immersed in the first of the succeeding turns, above which only the tilted edge of the last volution projects. The five post-nuclear whorls are rather high between the sutures, shouldered at the summit, almost flattened below the shoulder. The spaces between the shoulders and the sutures appear as cylindrical elements. The whorls are marked by rather strong, incremental lines and by numerous strong, wavy, incised, spiral striations. The periphery and the moderately long base of the body whorl are well rounded, marked like the spire. The oval aperture is large. The posterior angle is decidedly obtuse. The outer lip is thin. The inner lip is moderately strong, oblique, somewhat sinuous, slightly reflected, and provided with a fold some little distance anterior to its insertion. The parietal wall is glazed with a moderately thick callus.

== Distribution ==
This species occurs in the Pacific Ocean off California.
