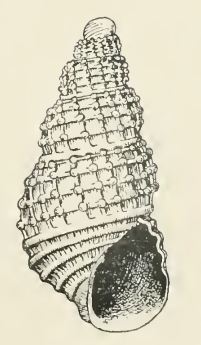
- Apertural view of the shell of Odostomia lucca

Scientific classification
- Kingdom: Animalia
- Phylum: Mollusca
- Class: Gastropoda
- Family: Pyramidellidae
- Genus: Odostomia
- Species: O. lucca

Binomial name
- Odostomia lucca Dall & Bartsch, 1909

Synonyms
- Odostomia (Chrysallida) lucca Dall & Bartsch, 1909 (basionym)

= Odostomia lucca =

Species of gastropod

Odostomia lucca is a species of sea snail, a marine gastropod mollusc in the family Pyramidellidae, the pyrams and their allies.

== Description ==
The broadly conic shell is milk-white. Its length measures 4 mm. The whorls of the protoconch are large, obliquely immersed in the first of the succeeding turns, above which the tilted edge of the last volution only projects, which shows five strong spiral threads. The five whorls of the teleoconch are well rounded, strongly contracted at the sutures, appressed at the summits with a sloping shoulder that extends from the summit to the second spiral keel. They are marked by narrow decidedly elevated, retractive axial ribs, of which 16 occur upon the first and second, 18 upon the third, and 22 upon the penultimate turn. In addition to the ribs, the whorls are marked between the sutures by four spiral keels, which equal the ribs in strength and render them decidedly nodulous at their junction. The spaces enclosed by the ribs and cords are well impressed rectangular pits whose axis coincides with the spiral sculpture. The sutures are subchanneled, showing a portion of the first basal keel in the last two volutions. The periphery of the body whorl is marked by a broad channel, crossed by the axial ribs which terminate at the posterior edge of the first basal keel. The base of the body whorl is well rounded. It is marked by five subequal and subequally spaced spiral lirations, separated by broad spaces which are marked by numerous prominent axial threads. The aperture is broadly oval. The posterior angle is obtuse. The outer lip is thin, showing the external sculpture within. The columella is moderately strong, curved, reinforced by the base. It is provided with a weak fold at its insertion. The parietal wall is covered with a thin callus.

== Distribution ==
The type species was found in the Pacific Ocean off San Diego, California.
