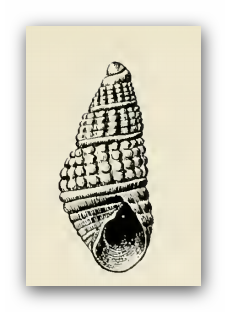
- Apertural view of a shell of Odostomia promeces

Scientific classification
- Kingdom: Animalia
- Phylum: Mollusca
- Class: Gastropoda
- Family: Pyramidellidae
- Genus: Odostomia
- Species: O. promeces

Binomial name
- Odostomia promeces Dall & Bartsch, 1909

Synonyms
- Chrysallida cincta Carpenter, 1864; Odostomia (Chrysallida) promeces Dall & Bartsch, 1909 (basionym)

= Odostomia promeces =

Species of gastropod

Odostomia promeces is a species of sea snail, a marine gastropod mollusc in the family Pyramidellidae, the pyrams and their allies.

== Description ==
The vitreous shell has an elongate-ovate shape. Its length measures 2.5 mm. The whorls of the protoconch are deeply obliquely immersed in the first of the succeeding turns, above which only the tilted edge of the last volution projects, which is marked by five slender spiral threads. The fiver whorls of the teleoconch are well rounded, strongly contracted at the periphery and slightly shouldered at the summit. They are marked on all but the first whorl, which is but feebly sculptured, by strong, rounded, decidedly retractive axial ribs, of which 14 occur upon the second, 16 upon the third, and 20 upon the penultimate turn. In addition to the ribs, the whorls are marked between the sutures, by four low, broad, spiral bands, separated by narrow channels which render their junction with the ribs decidedly nodulous. On the last two whorls the peripheral cord is apparent in the strongly constricted suture. The periphery of the body whorl is marked by a strong cord. The base of the shell is well rounded. It is marked by three subequal spiral cords and a plain area about the umbilicus. The grooves separating these cords are marked by many slender axial threads. The aperture is ovate. The posterior angle is obtuse. The outer lip is thin, showing the external sculpture within. The columella is moderately strong, slightly reflected, reinforced by the base, and provided with a fold at its insertion.

== Distribution ==
This species occurs in the Pacific Ocean off Baja California.
