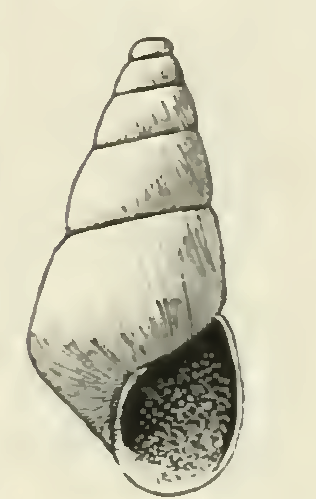
- Apertural view of Odostomia barkleyensis

Scientific classification
- Kingdom: Animalia
- Phylum: Mollusca
- Class: Gastropoda
- Family: Pyramidellidae
- Genus: Odostomia
- Species: O. barkleyensis

Binomial name
- Odostomia barkleyensis Dall & Bartsch, 1910

Synonyms
- Evalea barkleyensis Dall & Bartsch, 1910; Odostomia (Evalea) barkleyensis Dall & Bartsch, 1910

= Odostomia barkleyensis =

Species of gastropod

Odostomia barkleyensis is a species of sea snail, a marine gastropod mollusc in the family Pyramidellidae, the pyrams and their allies.

== Description ==
The shell is small, measuring 3.1 mm. It is regularly conic, bluish-white. The nuclear whorls are deeply and obliquely immersed in the first of the succeeding turns, above which only the tilted edge of the last volution projects. The 5½ post-nuclear whorls are slightly rounded. They are marked by fine retractive lines of growth and numerous fine, spiral striations. The sutures are strongly impressed. The periphery of the body whorl is subangulated. The base of the shell is rather short, sloping from the subangulated periphery to its anterior margin, with a tumid area bounding the narrow umbihcus, marked like the spire. The aperture is oval. The posterior angle is acute. The outer lip is thin. The inner lip is decidedly curved and reflected. The columella is provided with a strong oblique fold at its insertion. The parietal wall is glazed with a moderately thick callus.

== Distribution ==
This species occurs in the Pacific Ocean off British Columbia, Canada.
