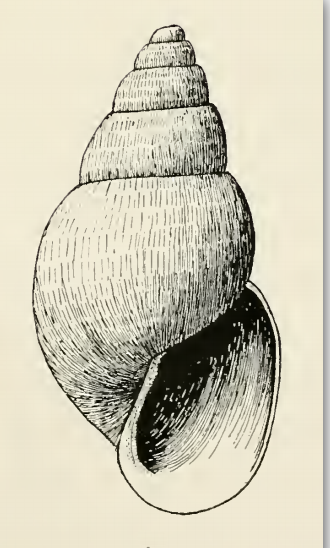
- Apertural view of a shell of Odostomia moratora

Scientific classification
- Kingdom: Animalia
- Phylum: Mollusca
- Class: Gastropoda
- Family: Pyramidellidae
- Genus: Odostomia
- Species: O. moratora

Binomial name
- Odostomia moratora Dall & Bartsch, 1909

Synonyms
- Aartsenia moratora (Dall & Bartsch, 1909); Odostomia (Amaura) moratora Dall & Bartsch, 1909

= Odostomia moratora =

Species of gastropod

Odostomia moratora is a species of sea snail, a marine gastropod mollusc in the family Pyramidellidae, the pyrams and their allies.

== Description ==
The elongate-ovate, yellowish-white shell is imperforate. Its length measures 9.5 mm. The whorls of the protoconch are decollated. The six whorls of the teleoconch are strongly rounded, moderately contracted at the sutures and narrowly flatly shouldered at the summit. They are marked by strong lines of growth and subobsolete fine spiral lirations which lend the surface a somewhat reticulated appearance. The spaces between the feeble lirations are marked by numerous very fine spiral striations. The periphery of the last whorl and base is inflated, strongly rounded and marked like the spire. The aperture is oval. The posterior angle is obtuse. The outer lip is thin. The columella is stout, oblique, revolute and provided with a strong fold a little below its insertion.

== Distribution ==
This species occurs in the Pacific Ocean off California.
