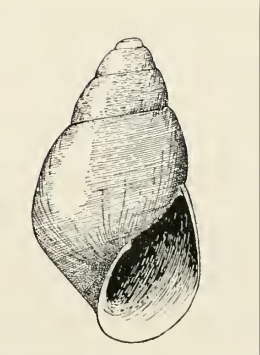
- Apertural view of the shell of Odostomia tacomaensis

Scientific classification
- Kingdom: Animalia
- Phylum: Mollusca
- Class: Gastropoda
- Family: Pyramidellidae
- Genus: Odostomia
- Species: O. tacomaensis

Binomial name
- Odostomia tacomaensis Dall & Bartsch, 1907

Synonyms
- Evalea tacomaensis (Dall & Bartsch, 1907); Odostomia (Evalea) tacomaensis Dall & Bartsch, 1907

= Odostomia tacomaensis =

Species of gastropod

Odostomia tacomaensis is a species of sea snail, a marine gastropod mollusc in the family Pyramidellidae, the pyrams and their allies.

== Description ==
The yellowish shell has an ovate shape. Its length measures 4.3 mm. The whorls of the protoconch are small, deeply immersed in the first of the succeeding turns. The five whorls of the teleoconch are well rounded, faintly roundly shouldered at the extreme summits. The periphery of the body whorl is rounded. The base of the shell is inflated, well rounded, and somewhat attenuated anteriorly. The surface is covered by numerous equal and equally closely spaced slender wavy spiral striations, of which there are about forty between the summit and the periphery of the body whorl. The base is marked like the space posterior to it. In addition to the spiral sculpture the entire surface of the shell is crossed by numerous fine lines of growth. The oval aperture is moderately large, and well rounded anteriorly. The posterior angle is acute. The outer lip is thin. The columella is curved, slightly reflected, reinforced, except at its extreme anterior end, by the attenuated base and provided with a strongly oblique fold at its insertion.

== Distribution ==
The type specimen was found in the Pacific Ocean off Tacoma, Washington.
