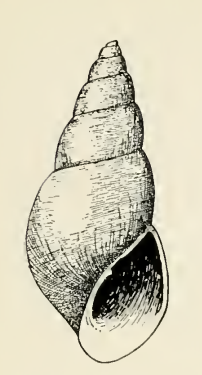
- Apertural view of a shell of Odostomia columbiana

Scientific classification
- Kingdom: Animalia
- Phylum: Mollusca
- Class: Gastropoda
- Family: Pyramidellidae
- Genus: Odostomia
- Species: O. columbiana

Binomial name
- Odostomia columbiana Dall & Bartsch, 1907

Synonyms
- Odostomia (Evalea) columbiana Dall and Bartsch, 1907

= Odostomia columbiana =

Species of gastropod

Odostomia columbiana is a species of sea snail, a marine gastropod mollusc in the family Pyramidellidae, the pyrams and their allies.

== Description ==
The white shell is large and has an elongate-conic shape. Its length measures 8.3 mm. The whorls of the protoconch are small, vitreous, planorboid, deeply obliquely immersed in the first of the succeeding turns, above which only the tilted edge of the last volution is visible. The six whorls of the teleoconch are increasing regularly in size, well rounded, very narrowly roundly shouldered at the summits, which renders the sutures well marked. The periphery of the body whorl is somewhat inflated. The base of the shell is well rounded, attenuated anteriorly to reenforce the columella. The entire surface is covered by numerous somewhat wavy, subequal and subequally closely placed spiral lirations, of which about 40 occur between the summit and the periphery and about an equal number on the base of the last whorl. The aperture is large, decidedly patulous anteriorly. The posterior angle is acute. The outer lip is thin at the edge but very thick within. The columella is curved and strongly reflected, free only at its anterior extremity, and provided with a strong oblique fold at its insertion.

== Distribution ==
This species occurs in the Pacific Ocean off Vancouver Island, British Columbia, Canada.
