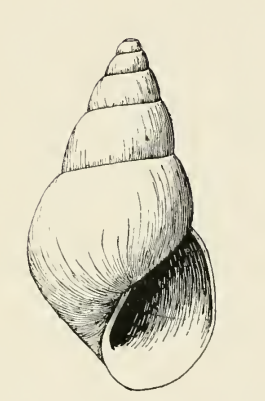
- Apertural view of a shell of Odostomia aleutica

Scientific classification
- Kingdom: Animalia
- Phylum: Mollusca
- Class: Gastropoda
- Family: Pyramidellidae
- Genus: Odostomia
- Species: O. aleutica

Binomial name
- Odostomia aleutica Dall & Bartsch, 1909

Synonyms
- Evalea aleutica Dall & Bartsch, 1909; Odostomia (Evalea) aleutica Dall & Bartsch, 1909 (basionym)

= Odostomia aleutica =

Species of gastropod

Odostomia aleutica is a species of sea snail, a marine gastropod mollusc in the family Pyramidellidae, the pyrams and their allies.

== Description ==
The broadly conic shell is light green. Its length is 4.4 mm. The nuclear whorls are small and deeply obliquely immersed in the first of the succeeding turns. The six post-nuclear whorls somewhat inflatedly rounded, with well-rounded summits. The entire surface is marked by fine lines of growth and numerous very fine, closely spaced, wavy, spiral striations. The sutures are strongly impressed. The periphery of the body whorl and the base of the shell are well rounded, the latter quite strongly inflated. The aperture is broadly ovate, somewhat effuse anteriorly. The posterior angle is acute. The thin outer lip is broadly curved. The columella is slender, curved, and reflected, free from the base, forming a suggestion of an umbilicus;. Thecolumellar fold is slender, situated a little below the insertion of the columella. The parietal wall is covered by a thin callus.

== Distribution ==
This marine species is found in the Bering Sea off Alaska.
