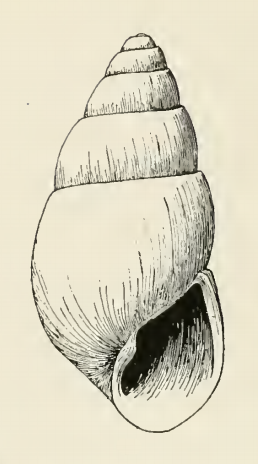
- Apertural view of a shell of Odostomia pesa

Scientific classification
- Kingdom: Animalia
- Phylum: Mollusca
- Class: Gastropoda
- Family: Pyramidellidae
- Genus: Odostomia
- Species: O. pesa

Binomial name
- Odostomia pesa Dall & Bartsch, 1909

Synonyms
- Aartsenia pesa (Dall & Bartsch, 1909); Odostomia (Amaura) pesa Dall & Bartsch, 1909

= Odostomia pesa =

Species of gastropod

Odostomia pesa is a species of sea snail, a marine gastropod mollusc in the family Pyramidellidae, the pyrams and their allies.

== Description ==
The very coarse and heavy shell has an elongate-ovate shape. Its length measures 9.3 mm. The whorls of the protoconch are small, deeply, obliquely immersed in the first of the succeeding turns. The six whorls of the teleoconch are rather high between the sutures, well rounded with narrowly tabulate summits. They are marked by somewhat retractive lines of growth and numerous, closely laced, wavy spiral striations. The sutures are well marked. The periphery of the body whorl is well rounded and marked like the spire. The base of the shell is slightly prolonged and well rounded. The aperture is ovate, somewhat effuse anteriorly. The posterior angle acute;. The outer lip is very heavy. The columella is strong, flexuose with a strong, broad fold somewhat anterior to its insertion. The parietal wall is covered by a thin callus.

== Distribution ==
This marine species occurs off Kodiak Island, Alaska.
