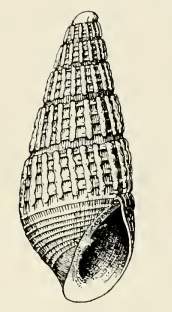
- Apertural view of the shell of Odostomia acrybia

Scientific classification
- Kingdom: Animalia
- Phylum: Mollusca
- Class: Gastropoda
- Family: Pyramidellidae
- Genus: Odostomia
- Species: O. acrybia

Binomial name
- Odostomia acrybia Dall & Bartsch, 1909

Synonyms
- Chrysallida acrybia Dall & Bartsch, 1909; Odostomia (Chrysallida) acrybia Dall & Bartsch, 1909

= Odostomia acrybia =

Species of gastropod

Odostomia acrybia is a species of sea snail, a marine gastropod mollusc in the family Pyramidellidae, the pyrams and their allies.

== Description ==
The elongate-conic shell is milk-white. Its length is 3.2 mm. The seven whorls of the teleoconch are very slightly rounded, somewhat contracted at the sutures, feebly shouldered at the summits. They are marked by strong, almost vertical axial ribs, of which 14 occur upon the second, 16 upon the third, 18 upon the fourth, 20 upon the fifth, and 22 upon the penultimate turn. The intercostal spaces are a little wider than the ribs, crossed by four slender spiral cords, the junction of which with the ribs renders them feebly nodulous. The sutures are strongly impressed but not channeled. The periphery and base of the body whorl are well rounded, the latter marked by nine slender spiral cords, the spaces between which are crossed by fine axial threads. The oval aperture is slightly effuse anteriorly The posterior angle is acute. The outer lip is thin, showing the external sculpture within. The columella is twisted, decidedly reflected anteriorly and provided with a strong fold at its insertion. The parietal wall is covered with a thick callus.

== Distribution ==
This species occurs in the Pacific Ocean off Baja California.
