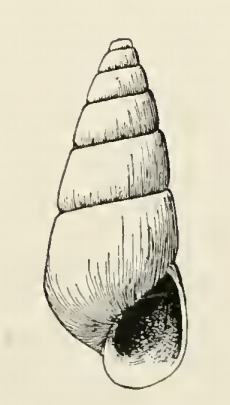
- Apertural view of the gastropod shell of Odostomia nemo

Scientific classification
- Kingdom: Animalia
- Phylum: Mollusca
- Class: Gastropoda
- Family: Pyramidellidae
- Genus: Odostomia
- Species: O. nemo

Binomial name
- Odostomia nemo Dall & Bartsch, 1909

Synonyms
- Evalea nemo (Dall & Bartsch, 1909); Odostomea (Evalea) nemo Dall & Bartsch, 1909

= Odostomia nemo =

Species of gastropod

Odostomia nemo is a species of sea snail, a marine gastropod mollusc in the family Pyramidellidae, the pyrams and their allies.

== Description ==
The elongate-conic shell is milk-white. Its length is 4.8 mm. The whorls of the protoconch are deeply obliquely immersed in the first of the succeeding turns, above which only the edge of the last volution projects. The seven whorls of the teleoconch are flattened in the middle (in this, it differs from O. tenuis and O. valdesi), moderately contracted at the suture, and roundly shouldered at the summit. The sutures are strongly impressed. The periphery and base of the body whorl is somewhat inflated, well rounded, the latter very frequently narrowly umbilicated. The entire surface of the spire and base is marked by vertical lines of growth and numerous exceedingly fine, spiral striations. The aperture is ovate, somewhat effuse anteriorly. The posterior angle is acute. The outer lip is thin. The columella is thin, curved, strongly reflected, provided with a fold at its insertion. The parietal wall is glazed with a thin callus.

== Distribution ==
This species occurs in the Pacific Ocean off California.
