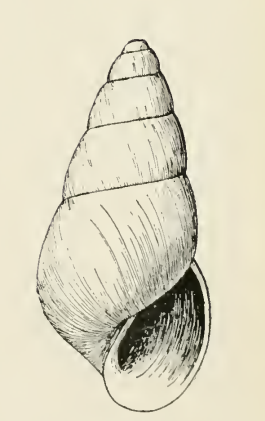
- Apertural view of a shell of Odostomia kadiakensis

Scientific classification
- Kingdom: Animalia
- Phylum: Mollusca
- Class: Gastropoda
- Family: Pyramidellidae
- Genus: Odostomia
- Species: O. kadiakensis

Binomial name
- Odostomia kadiakensis Dall & Bartsch, 1909

Synonyms
- Odostomia (Evalea) kadiakensis Dall & Bartsch, 1909

= Odostomia kadiakensis =

Species of gastropod

Odostomia kadiakensis is a species of sea snail, a marine gastropod mollusc in the family Pyramidellidae, the pyrams and their allies.

== Description ==
The very regularly elongate conic shell is umbilicated, yellowish white. It measures 5.2 mm. The whorls of the protoconch are decollated. The six whorls of the teleoconch are moderately rounded. The spiral sculpture is marked by vertical lines of growth and numerous, exceedingly fine, wavy, spiral striations. The sutures are deeply impressed and not strongly contracted (as in O. aleutica). The periphery of the body whorl is rounded. The base of the shell is strongly inflated and marked like the spire. The umbilicus is narrow, partly covered by the strongly reflected columella. The aperture is ovate, effuse anteriorly. The posterior angle is acute. The outer lip is thin. The columella is thin, very oblique, strongly curved anteriorly and decidedly reflected, provided with a weak fold a little anterior to its insertion.

== Distribution ==
The type specimen of this species was found off Kodiak Island, Gulf of Alaska.
