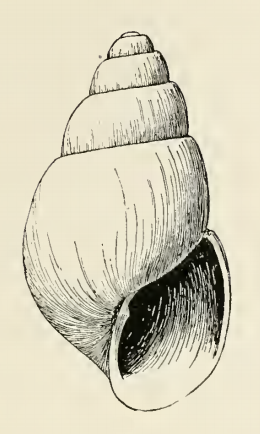
- Apertural view of a shell of Odostomia elsa

Scientific classification
- Kingdom: Animalia
- Phylum: Mollusca
- Class: Gastropoda
- Family: Pyramidellidae
- Genus: Odostomia
- Species: O. elsa

Binomial name
- Odostomia elsa Dall & Bartsch, 1909

Synonyms
- Aartsenia elsa (Dall & Bartsch, 1909); Odostomia (Amaura) elsa Dall & Bartsch, 1909

= Odostomia elsa =

Species of gastropod

Odostomia elsa iya nya sebansa tekuyung tasik tauka marine gastropod mollusc ba raban family Pyramidellidae, the pyrams and their allies.

== Penerang ==
The yellowish-white shell is ovate and umbilicated. Its length measures 6.1 mm. The whorls of the protoconch are very small and deeply immersed in the first of the succeeding turns. The six whorls of the teleoconch are well-rounded, with strongly concave summits, forming deeply channelled sutures. They are marked by slightly retractive lines of growth, and exceedingly fine, closely placed, wavy spiral striations. The periphery of the body whorl is well-rounded. The base of the shell is short, inflated, andmoderately umbilicated. The aperture is ovate. The posterior angle is obtuse. The columella is curved, slightly reflected, not reinforced by the base and provided with an oblique fold at some little distance anterior to its insertion. A thin callus covers the parietal wall.

== Distribution ==
This species occurs in the Pacific Ocean off Alaska.
