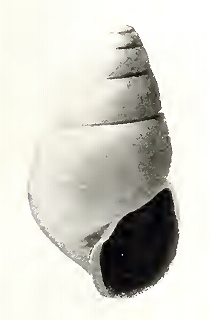
- Drawing of a shell of Odostomia valeroi

Scientific classification
- Kingdom: Animalia
- Phylum: Mollusca
- Class: Gastropoda
- Family: Pyramidellidae
- Genus: Odostomia
- Species: O. valeroi

Binomial name
- Odostomia valeroi Bartsch, 1917

Synonyms
- Evalea valeroi (Bartsch, 1917); Odostomia (Evalea) valeroi Bartsch, 1917

= Odostomia valeroi =

Species of gastropod

Odostomia valeroi is a species of sea snail, a marine gastropod mollusc in the family Pyramidellidae, the pyrams and their allies.

== Description ==
The thin, bluish white shell has an ovate shape and is narrowly umbilicated. Its length measures 3 mm. The whorls of the protoconch are small, completely, deeply, obliquely immersed in the first of the succeeding turns. The five whorls of the teleoconch are inflated, strongly rounded, and appressed at the summit. They are crossed by numerous very fine, closely spaced spiral striations. The suture is moderately constricted. The periphery of the body whorl is inflated, and well rounded. The base of the shell is short, inflated, strongly rounded, and narrowly umbilicated. The aperture is broadly oval. The posterior angle is obtuse. The outer lip is thin. It is protracted between the summit and periphery to form a claw-like element. The inner lip is decidedly curved, slender, and somewhat revolute. It is provided with a strong oblique fold at its insertion. The parietal wall is glazed with a thin callus.

== Distribution ==
The type specimen was found in the Pacific Ocean off Magdalena Bay, Lower California.
