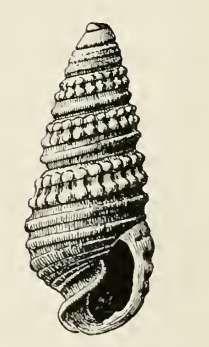
- Apertural view of the shell of Odostomia hemphilli

Scientific classification
- Kingdom: Animalia
- Phylum: Mollusca
- Class: Gastropoda
- Family: Pyramidellidae
- Genus: Odostomia
- Species: O. hemphilli

Binomial name
- Odostomia hemphilli Dall & Bartsch, 1909

Synonyms
- Odostomia (Miralda) hemphilli Dall & Bartsch, 1909

= Odostomia hemphilli =

Species of sea snail

Odostomia hemphilli is a species of sea snail, a marine gastropod mollusc in the family Pyramidellidae, the pyrams and their allies.

== Description ==
The broadly conic shell is milk-white and measures 3.5 mm. The whorls of the protoconch are deeply obliquely immersed, apparently smooth. The six whorls of the teleoconch are well rounded. They are marked with three strong, equal spiral keels, the posterior two of which are tuberculate, the third one smooth. The tubercles are connected axially by slender riblets, which extend to the third keel. There are about twenty tubercles on the latter whorls, while on the early whorls they are ill defined. The sutures are deeply channeled. The periphery of the body whorl is marked by a smooth spiral keel, equal to the one posterior to it. The base of the shell is moderately long, well rounded and marked by four spiral keels which grow successively weaker anteriorly. The aperture is irregularly ovate. The posterior angle is obtuse. The outer lip is thin, showing the external sculpture within. The columella is stout, provided with a strong fold at its insertion.

== Distribution ==
This species occurs in the Pacific Ocean off Lower California.
