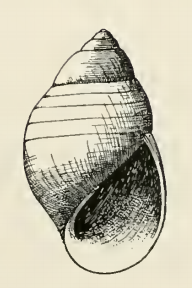
- Apertural view of a shell of Odostomia atossa

Scientific classification
- Kingdom: Animalia
- Phylum: Mollusca
- Class: Gastropoda
- Family: Pyramidellidae
- Genus: Odostomia
- Species: O. atossa

Binomial name
- Odostomia atossa Dall, 1908

Synonyms
- Evalea atossa Dall, 1908; Odostomia (Evalea) atossa Dall, 1908 (basionym)

= Odostomia atossa =

Species of gastropod

Odostomia atossa is a species of sea snail, a marine gastropod mollusc in the family Pyramidellidae, the pyrams and their allies.

== Description ==
The large, ovate shell is bluish-white. Its length measures 6.5 mm. The whorls of the protoconch are small, deeply obliquely immersed in the first of the succeeding turns, above which only the tilted edge of the last volution projects. The five whorls of the teleoconch are inflated, well rounded and feebly contracted at the sutures. They are very weakly shouldered at the summit, marked by fine, slightly retractive lines of growth, and by 7 incised spiral lines on the first, 10 on the second, and 20 on the third. On the last whorl they are very feeble between the sutures, where they are replaced by four slender, spiral threads. The periphery of the body whorl is inflated. The base of the shell is inflated, well rounded and marked by numerous, closely spaced, fine spiral striations. The aperture is large, ovate. The postenor angle is acute. The outer lip is thin. The columella is moderately strong, strongly curved, decidedly reflected, partly reinforced by the base and provided with a fold at its insertion.

== Distribution ==
This species occurs in the Pacific Ocean off California.
