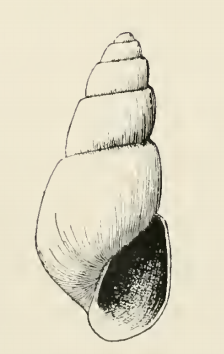
- Apertural view of a shell of Odostomia profundicola

Scientific classification
- Kingdom: Animalia
- Phylum: Mollusca
- Class: Gastropoda
- Family: Pyramidellidae
- Genus: Odostomia
- Species: O. profundicola

Binomial name
- Odostomia profundicola Dall & Bartsch, 1909

Synonyms
- Evalea profundicola Dall & Bartsch, 1909; Odostomia (Evalea) profundicola Dall & Bartsch, 1909

= Odostomia profundicola =

Species of gastropod

Odostomia profundicola is a species of sea snail, a marine gastropod mollusc in the family Pyramidellidae, the pyrams and their allies.

== Description ==
The milk-white shell has a turreted shape. Its length measures 4.5 mm. The whorls of the protoconch are deeply obliquely immersed in the first of the succeeding turns, above which only the tilted edge of the last volution projects. The six whorls of the teleoconch are moderately rounded, slightly contracted at the sutures, broadly tabulately shouldered at the summit. The periphery and the base of the body whorl are somewhat inflated and strongly rounded. The entire surface of the spire and the base are marked by numerous vertical lines of growth and exceedingly fine microscopic, closely spaced, spiral striations. The ovate aperture is very large. The posterior angle is obtuse. The outer lip is thin. The columella is slender, somewhat twisted, oblique, slightly revolute, and provided with a deep-seated fold.

== Distribution ==
The type specimen was found in the Pacific Ocean off San Diego, California.
