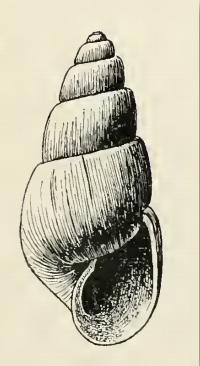
- Apertural view of a shell of Odostomia farallonensis

Scientific classification
- Kingdom: Animalia
- Phylum: Mollusca
- Class: Gastropoda
- Family: Pyramidellidae
- Genus: Odostomia
- Species: O. farallonensis

Binomial name
- Odostomia farallonensis Dall & Bartsch, 1909

Synonyms
- Aartsenia farallonensis Dall & Bartsch, 1909

= Odostomia farallonensis =

Species of gastropod

Odostomia farallonensis is a species of sea snail, a marine gastropod mollusc in the family Pyramidellidae, the pyrams and their allies.

== Description ==
The shell is very elongate-ovate, deeply umbilicated, light yellow. Its length measures 5.5 mm. The whorls of the protoconch are very deeply immersed. The five whorls of the teleoconch are very slightly rounded in the middle between the sutures, more strongly so near the anterior end and toward the summit. The summit is strongly narrowly tabulate. The periphery of the body whorl is inflated. The base of the shell is very strongly suddenly rounded, widely and deeply umbilicated. The entire surface is marked by numerous fine, closely spaced, spiral striations. The aperture is broadly ovate. The posterior angle is obtuse. The outer lip is thin. The columella is very slender, strongly curved, revolute, and provided with a deep fold a little below its insertion. The parietal wall is glazed with a thin callus.

== Distribution ==
This species occurs in the Pacific Ocean off the Farallon Islands, California.
