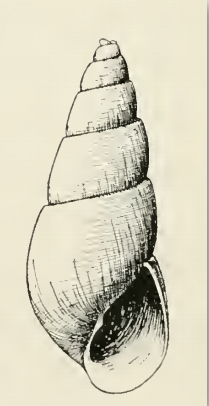
- Apertural view of a shell of Odostomia serilla

Scientific classification
- Kingdom: Animalia
- Phylum: Mollusca
- Class: Gastropoda
- Family: Pyramidellidae
- Genus: Odostomia
- Species: O. serilla

Binomial name
- Odostomia serilla Dall & Bartsch, 1909

Synonyms
- Evalea serilla (Dall & Bartsch, 1909); Odostomia (Evalea) serilla Dall & Bartsch, 1909

= Odostomia serilla =

Species of gastropod

Odostomia serilla is a species of sea snail, a marine gastropod mollusc in the family Pyramidellidae, the pyrams and their allies.

== Description ==
The white shell has an elongate-conic shape. Its length measures 4.8 mm. The whorls of the protoconch are deeply obliquely immersed in the first of the succeeding turns, above which only the titled edge of the last volution projects. The six whorls of the teleoconch are well rounded, rather high between the sutures, contracted at the periphery. They are strongly, narrowly tabulately shouldered at the summit. The sutures are strongly marked. The periphery of the body whorl and the rather long base are well rounded. The entire surface of the spire and the base are marked by numerous lines of growth and well-incised spiral striations. The aperture is ovate. The posterior angle is acute. The outer lip is thin. The columella is strongly curved, slightly revolute, and provided with a fold at its insertion.

== Distribution ==
This species occurs in the Pacific Ocean off San Diego, California.
