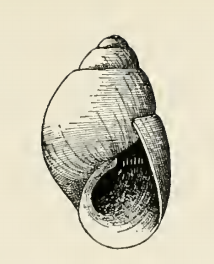
- Apertural view of a shell of Odostomia lucasana

Scientific classification
- Kingdom: Animalia
- Phylum: Mollusca
- Class: Gastropoda
- Family: Pyramidellidae
- Genus: Odostomia
- Species: O. lucasana

Binomial name
- Odostomia lucasana Dall & Bartsch, 1909

Synonyms
- Evalea lucasana Dall & Bartsch, 1909; Odostomia (Evalea) lucasana Dall & Bartsch, 1909 (basionym)

= Odostomia lucasana =

Species of gastropod

Odostomia lucasana is a species of sea snail, a marine gastropod mollusc in the family Pyramidellidae, the pyrams and their allies.

== Description ==
The light yellow shell has a broadly oval shape. Its length measures 4.7 mm. The whorls of the protoconch are deeply obliquely immersed in the first of the succeeding turns. The five whorls of the teleoconch are inflated, weakly contracted at the sutures, appressed at the summits. The first whorl is marked by several slender strongly incised spiral lines, the remaining with numerous very fine closely crowded, wavy, spiral striations. The sutures are well impressed. The periphery and the base of the body whorl are well inflated. They are marked like the space between the sutures. The aperture is very large and very broadly ovate. The posterior angle is acute. The outer lip is thin. The columella is stout, strongly curved, reflected, reinforced by the base and provided with a strong fold at its insertion.

== Distribution ==
This species occurs in the Pacific Ocean off Baja California peninsula.
