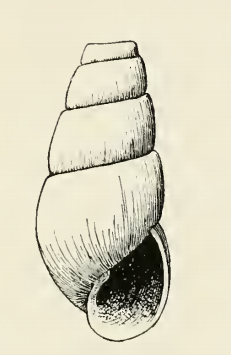
- Apertural view of a shell of Odostomia parella

Scientific classification
- Kingdom: Animalia
- Phylum: Mollusca
- Class: Gastropoda
- Family: Pyramidellidae
- Genus: Odostomia
- Species: O. parella

Binomial name
- Odostomia parella Dall & Bartsch, 1909

Synonyms
- Evalea parella Dall & Bartsch, 1909; Odostomia (Evalea) parella Dall & Bartsch, 1909

= Odostomia parella =

Species of gastropod

Odostomia parella is a species of sea snail, a marine gastropod mollusc in the family Pyramidellidae, the pyrams and their allies.

== Description ==
The pale yellow shell has an elongate-conic shape. (The whorls of the protoconch are decollated). The five to seven whorls of the teleoconch are flattened in the middle between the sutures, strongly contracted at the periphery, moderately roundly shouldered at the summit. They are marked by rather strong lines of growth and exceedingly fine, closely spaced, microscopic spiral striations. The sutures are strongly contracted. The periphery and the base of the body whorl are well rounded, the latter slightly inflated, marked like the spire. The aperture is ovate. The posterior angle is acute. The outer lip is thin. The columella is very strongly curved, somewhat revolute, reinforced by the base, and provided with a fold at its insertion.

== Description ==
This species occurs in the Pacific Ocean off the Galapagos Islands.
