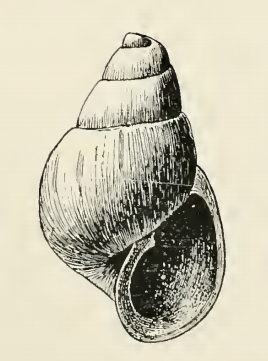
- Apertural view of a shell of Odostomia beringi

Scientific classification
- Kingdom: Animalia
- Phylum: Mollusca
- Class: Gastropoda
- Family: Pyramidellidae
- Genus: Odostomia
- Species: O. beringi

Binomial name
- Odostomia beringi Dall, 1871

Synonyms
- Aartsenia beringi Dall, 1871; Odostomia (Amaura) beringi Dall, 1871

= Odostomia beringi =

Species of gastropod

Odostomia beringi is a species of sea snail, a marine gastropod mollusc in the family Pyramidellidae, the pyrams and their allies.

== Description ==
The ovate, umbilicated shell is bluish white. Its length measures 5.7 mm. The whorls of the protoconch are small, obliquely immersed in the first of the succeeding turns. The five whorls of the teleoconch are moderately rounded, slightly shouldered at the summits, marked by retractive lines of growth. The periphery of the body whorl is well rounded. The base of the shell is short and strongly umbilicated. The aperture is oval;. The posterior angle is obtuse. The outer lip is thin. The columella is strong, sinuous, decidedly reflected and is provided with a strong fold a little below its insertion. The parietal wall is glazed by a callus.

== Distribution ==
This species occurs in the Pacific Ocean off Alaska at the Norton Sound.
