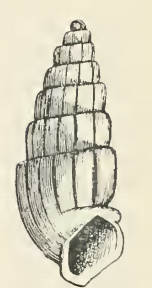
- Drawing of a shell of Odostomia tropidita

Scientific classification
- Kingdom: Animalia
- Phylum: Mollusca
- Class: Gastropoda
- Family: Pyramidellidae
- Genus: Odostomia
- Species: O. tropidita

Binomial name
- Odostomia tropidita Dall & Bartsch, 1909

Synonyms
- Salassia carinata De Folin, 1872

= Odostomia tropidita =

Species of gastropod

Odostomia tropidita is a species of sea snail, a marine gastropod mollusc in the family Pyramidellidae, the pyrams and their allies.

== Description ==
The white shell has a pupiform shape. Its length measures 2.5 mm. The 1 1/2 whorls of the protoconch form a moderately elevated helicoid spire, whose axis is at right angles to that of the succeeding turns, in the first of which it is about one-third immersed. The seven whorls of the teleoconch are moderately rounded, somewhat contracted at the sutures, and strongly tabulated on the summits. They are marked by rounded, weak, axial ribs of which eight occur upon the first and second, ten upon the third, twelve upon the fourth and fifth, and fourteen upon the penultimate turn. The intercostal spaces are broad and shallow. The periphery of the body whorl and base are well rounded. They are marked by the continuation of the ribs. The aperture is broadly oval. The outer lip is thin. The columella is slender and slightly curved.

== Distribution ==
The type species was found off the Isle of Pearls, Bay of Panama.
