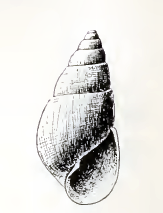
- Apertural view of the shell of Odostomia nota

Scientific classification
- Kingdom: Animalia
- Phylum: Mollusca
- Class: Gastropoda
- Family: Pyramidellidae
- Genus: Odostomia
- Species: O. nota

Binomial name
- Odostomia nota Dall & Bartsch, 1909

Synonyms
- Odostomia (Amaura) nota Dall & Bartsch, 1909

= Odostomia nota =

Species of gastropod

Odostomia nota is a species of sea snail, a marine gastropod mollusc in the family Pyramidellidae, the pyrams and their allies.

McLean (2007) considers this species a synonym of Aartsenia pupiformis (Carpenter, 1865)

== Description ==
The light yellow shell has a very elongate-ovate shape. Its length measures 7.5 mm (0.30 in). The whorls of the protoconch are deeply obliquely immersed in the first of the succeeding turns, above which only the tilted edge of the last volution projects. The seven whorls of the teleoconch are moderately rounded and slightly contracted at the sutures, narrowly tabulately shouldered at the summits. They are marked by numerous closely spaced, wavy spiral striations. The periphery and the base of the body whorl are somewhat inflated and well rounded. They are marked like the spire. The aperture is ovate. The posterior angle is obtuse. The outer lip is thin. The columella is short, strongly curved and reflected. It is provided with a moderately strong fold a little anterior to its insertion.

== Distribution ==
This species occurs in the Pacific Ocean off California.
