= Odostomia schrami =

Scientific classification
- Kingdom: Animalia
- Phylum: Mollusca
- Class: Gastropoda
- Family: Pyramidellidae
- Genus: Odostomia
- Species: O. schrami

Binomial name
- Odostomia schrami van Aartsen, Gittenberger E. & Goud, 1998

Synonyms
- Odostomia (Odostomia) schrami van Aartsen, Gittenberger E. & Goud, 1998

Species of gastropod

Odostomia schrami is a species of sea snail, a marine gastropod mollusc in the family Pyramidellidae, the pyrams and their allies.

== Description ==
The slender, white shell has an oval shape and is glossy and transparent. Its length measures 3 mm, of which 2/3 are occupied by the body whorl. The whorls of the protoconch are intorted, somewhat obliquely immersed in the first turn of the teleoconch. The 4 1/2 to 5 1/2 whorls of the teleoconch are slightly convex with a smooth sculpture. The growth lines are directed at right angles to the growth direction of the cone, but become flexuous or sinuous on the lower whorls. The base of the body whorl is well rounded. The sutures are well impressed. The narrowly oval aperture is rather large and occupies about 1/3 of the total length, and is somewhat effuse anteriorly The posterior angle is obtuse. The outer lip is thin. The base of the shell is quite short, rounded, and lacking an umbilicus. The columellar tooth is conspicuous and in a rather high position on the columella.

== Distribution ==
This species occurs in the Atlantic Ocean off Mauritania at depths between 15 mm and 75 m.
