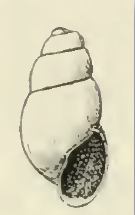
- Apertural view of Odostomia palmeri

Scientific classification
- Kingdom: Animalia
- Phylum: Mollusca
- Class: Gastropoda
- Family: Pyramidellidae
- Genus: Odostomia
- Species: O. palmeri

Binomial name
- Odostomia palmeri Bartsch, 1912

Synonyms
- Odostomia (Evalea) palmeri Bartsch, 1912

= Odostomia palmeri =

Species of gastropod

Odostomia palmeri is a species of sea snail, a marine gastropod mollusc in the family Pyramidellidae, the pyrams and their allies.

== Description ==
The shell is very small, measuring 1.4 mm. It is elongate-ovate, semitranslucent, bluish-white. The nuclear whorls are deeply, obliquely immersed in the first of the succeeding turns, above which only the tilted edge of the last volution projects. The four post-nuclear whorls are well rounded, feebly shouldered at the summit. They are marked by exceedingly fine, almost vertical lines of growth and microscopic spiral striations. The sutures are strongly impressed. The periphery and the rather long base of the body whorl are well rounded, marked like the spire. The aperture is very large, regularly ovate. The posterior angle is obtuse. The outer lip is thin. The inner lipis very oblique, almost straight, very slender and very slightly revolute. The parietal wall is glazed with a thin callus.

== Distribution ==
This species occurs off the head of the Gulf of California.
