= Odostomia romburghi =

Scientific classification
- Kingdom: Animalia
- Phylum: Mollusca
- Class: Gastropoda
- Family: Pyramidellidae
- Genus: Odostomia
- Species: O. romburghi

Binomial name
- Odostomia romburghi van Aartsen, Gittenberger & Goud, 1998

Species of gastropod

Odostomia romburghi is a species of sea snail, a marine gastropod mollusk in the family Pyramidellidae, the pyrams and their allies.

== Description ==
The bluish-white shell has a conic shape with straight sides. Its length measures 4 mm. The whorls of the protoconch have a depressed helicoid shape. There are six to seven whorls in the teleoconch showing an almost smooth sculpture. The growth lines lean forward with respect to the direction of the cone. The aperture is pyriform. The upper part of the outer lip is straight up to the middle where it forms a strong angle and then the lower part curves gently toward the columella. The periphery of the body whorl forms an acute angle. The sutures are channeled. The umbilicus shows a narrow chink; The columellar tooth is situated high on the parietal shield.

== Distribution ==
This species occurs in the following locations:

- Cape Verde at depths between 18 m and 400 m.
