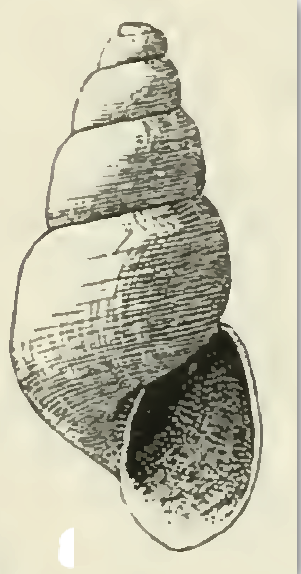
- Apertural view of Odostomia spreadboroughi

Scientific classification
- Kingdom: Animalia
- Phylum: Mollusca
- Class: Gastropoda
- Family: Pyramidellidae
- Genus: Odostomia
- Species: O. spreadboroughi

Binomial name
- Odostomia spreadboroughi Dall & Bartsch, 1910

= Odostomia spreadboroughi =

Species of gastropod

Odostomia spreadboroughi is a species of sea snail, a marine gastropod mollusc in the family Pyramidellidae, the pyrams and their allies.
