= Odostomia dalsumi =

Scientific classification
- Kingdom: Animalia
- Phylum: Mollusca
- Class: Gastropoda
- Family: Pyramidellidae
- Genus: Odostomia
- Species: O. dalsumi

Binomial name
- Odostomia dalsumi van Aartsen, Gittenberger & Goud, 1998

Species of gastropod

Odostomia dalsumi is a species of sea snail, a marine gastropod mollusk in the family Pyramidellidae, the pyrams and their allies.

== Description ==
Odostomia dalsumi is a species of sea snail, a marine gastropod mollusk in the family Pyramidellidae, commonly referred to as pyrams and their allies. The shell of this micromollusc is minute, growing to a length of approximately 1 mm. It is characterized by its conical shape and smooth surface, typical of the genus Odostomia. The species was first described by van Aartsen, Gittenberger, and Goud in 1998.

== Distribution ==
This species occurs in the following locations:

- Cape Verde
