= Odostomia occultidens =

Scientific classification
- Kingdom: Animalia
- Phylum: Mollusca
- Class: Gastropoda
- Family: Pyramidellidae
- Genus: Odostomia
- Species: O. occultidens

Binomial name
- Odostomia occultidens May, 1915

Species of gastropod

Odostomia occultidens, common name the hidden-toothed pyramid-shell, is a species of sea snail, a marine gastropod mollusc in the family Pyramidellidae, the pyrams and their allies.

== Description ==
The length of the shell measures 1.5 mm. The minute, white shell is translucent, shining, and smooth. The shell contains three whorls plus a prominent heterostrophe pullus. The adult whorls are rounded, regularly increasing. The aperture is ovately-pyriform. The columella is arched, thin, with a minute plication, rather above the centre, which is invisible from a front view.

== Distribution ==
This species is found in the littoral zone and offshore off New South Wales, the Bass Strait and Tasmania
