= Odostomia bernardi =

Scientific classification
- Kingdom: Animalia
- Phylum: Mollusca
- Class: Gastropoda
- Family: Pyramidellidae
- Genus: Odostomia
- Species: O. bernardi

Binomial name
- Odostomia bernardi (van Aartsen, Gittenberger & Goud, 1998)

Species of gastropod

Odostomia bernardi is a species of sea snail, a marine gastropod mollusc in the family Pyramidellidae, the pyrams and their allies.

== Description ==
The length of the gradually tapering shell varies between 1.4 mm and 1.6 mm. It is white and slightly transparent.

== Distribution ==
This species occurs in the Azores Exclusive Economic Zone and in European waters (ERMS scope).
