= Odostomia virginica =

Scientific classification
- Kingdom: Animalia
- Phylum: Mollusca
- Class: Gastropoda
- Family: Pyramidellidae
- Genus: Odostomia
- Species: O. virginica

Binomial name
- Odostomia virginica Henderson & Bartsch, 1914

Synonyms
- Evalea virginica (Henderson & Bartsch, 1914)

Species of gastropod

Odostomia virginica, common name the Virginia odostome, is a species of sea snail, a marine gastropod mollusc in the family Pyramidellidae, the pyrams and their allies.

== Description ==
The shell reaches a length of 2.7 mm.

== Distribution ==
This species occurs in the Atlantic Ocean off Virginia, USA.
