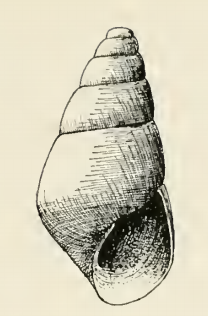

Scientific classification
- Kingdom: Animalia
- Phylum: Mollusca
- Class: Gastropoda
- Family: Pyramidellidae
- Genus: Odostomia
- Species: O. californica

Binomial name
- Odostomia californica Dall & Bartsch, 1909

= Odostomia californica =

Species of gastropod

Odostomia californica is a species of sea snail, a marine gastropod mollusc in the family Pyramidellidae, the pyrams and their allies.
