= Odostomia acutidens =

Scientific classification
- Kingdom: Animalia
- Phylum: Mollusca
- Class: Gastropoda
- Family: Pyramidellidae
- Genus: Odostomia
- Species: O. acutidens

Binomial name
- Odostomia acutidens Dall, 1884

Species of gastropod

Odostomia acutidens (common name: the sharp-tooth odostome) is a species of sea snail, a marine gastropod mollusc in the family Pyramidellidae, the pyrams and their allies.

== Description ==
The shell grows to a length of 4 mm.

== Distribution ==
This species occurs in the Gulf of Mexico (Florida).
