= Odostomia bachia =

Scientific classification
- Kingdom: Animalia
- Phylum: Mollusca
- Class: Gastropoda
- Family: Pyramidellidae
- Genus: Odostomia
- Species: O. bachia

Binomial name
- Odostomia bachia Bartsch, 1927

Synonyms
- Evalea bachia Bartsch, 1927

Species of gastropod

Odostomia bachia is a species of sea snail, a marine gastropod mollusc in the family Pyramidellidae, the pyrams and their allies.

== Distribution ==
This species occurs in the Pacific Ocean off California.
