= Odostomia gittenbergeri =

Scientific classification
- Kingdom: Animalia
- Phylum: Mollusca
- Class: Gastropoda
- Family: Pyramidellidae
- Genus: Odostomia
- Species: O. gittenbergeri

Binomial name
- Odostomia gittenbergeri van Aartsen & Corgan, 1996

Synonyms
- Odostomia dulcis W.H. Turton, 1932

Species of gastropod

Odostomia gittenbergeri is a species of sea snail, a marine gastropod mollusc in the family Pyramidellidae, the pyrams and their allies.
