= Odostomia nova =

Scientific classification
- Kingdom: Animalia
- Phylum: Mollusca
- Class: Gastropoda
- Family: Pyramidellidae
- Genus: Odostomia
- Species: O. nova

Binomial name
- Odostomia nova Castellanos, 1982

Species of gastropod

Odostomia nova is a species of sea snail, a marine gastropod mollusc in the family Pyramidellidae, the pyrams and their allies.

== Description ==
The shell grows to a length of 3 mm.

== Distribution ==
This species occurs in the Atlantic Ocean off Argentina.
