= Odostomia fujitanii =

Scientific classification
- Kingdom: Animalia
- Phylum: Mollusca
- Class: Gastropoda
- Family: Pyramidellidae
- Genus: Odostomia
- Species: O. fujitanii

Binomial name
- Odostomia fujitanii Yokoyama, 1927

Species of gastropod

Odostomia fujitanii is a species of sea snail, a marine gastropod mollusc in the family Pyramidellidae, the pyrams and their allies.

== Habitat ==
This species is found in the following habitats:

- Brackish
- Marine
