= Odostomia strongi =

Scientific classification
- Kingdom: Animalia
- Phylum: Mollusca
- Class: Gastropoda
- Family: Pyramidellidae
- Genus: Odostomia
- Species: O. strongi

Binomial name
- Odostomia strongi Bartsch, 1927

Synonyms
- Evalea strongi (Bartsch, 1927)

Species of gastropod

Odostomia strongi is a species of sea snail, a marine gastropod mollusc in the family Pyramidellidae, the pyrams and their allies.

This species was named for A. M. Strong.
