= Odostomia kergueleae =

Scientific classification
- Kingdom: Animalia
- Phylum: Mollusca
- Class: Gastropoda
- Family: Pyramidellidae
- Genus: Odostomia
- Species: O. kergueleae

Binomial name
- Odostomia kergueleae van Aartsen & Corgan, 1996

Synonyms
- Odostomia peregrina Thiele, 1912

Species of gastropod

Odostomia kergueleae is a species of sea snail, a marine gastropod mollusk in the family Pyramidellidae, the pyrams and their allies.
