= Odostomia tomlini =

Scientific classification
- Kingdom: Animalia
- Phylum: Mollusca
- Class: Gastropoda
- Family: Pyramidellidae
- Genus: Odostomia
- Species: O. tomlini

Binomial name
- Odostomia tomlini W. H. Turton, 1933

Synonyms
- Odostomia obtusa W.H. Turton, 1932

Species of gastropod

Odostomia tomlini is a species of sea snail, a marine gastropod mollusc in the family Pyramidellidae, the pyrams and their allies.
