= Odostomia dyma =

Scientific classification
- Kingdom: Animalia
- Phylum: Mollusca
- Class: Gastropoda
- Family: Pyramidellidae
- Genus: Odostomia
- Species: O. dyma

Binomial name
- Odostomia dyma van Aartsen & Corgan, 1996

Synonyms
- Odostomia didyma W.H. Turton, 1932

Species of gastropod

Odostomia dyma is a species of sea snail, a marine gastropod mollusc in the family Pyramidellidae, the pyrams and their allies.
