= Odostomia sordida =

Scientific classification
- Kingdom: Animalia
- Phylum: Mollusca
- Class: Gastropoda
- Family: Pyramidellidae
- Genus: Odostomia
- Species: O. sordida

Binomial name
- Odostomia sordida (Lea, 1842)

Synonyms
- Pasithea sordida Lea, 1842

Species of gastropod

Odostomia sordida is a species of sea snail, a marine gastropod mollusc in the family Pyramidellidae, the pyrams and their allies.
