= Odostomia chitonicola =

Scientific classification
- Kingdom: Animalia
- Phylum: Mollusca
- Class: Gastropoda
- Family: Pyramidellidae
- Genus: Odostomia
- Species: O. chitonicola

Binomial name
- Odostomia chitonicola E. A. Smith, 1899

Species of gastropod

Odostomia chitonicola is a species of sea snail, a marine gastropod mollusc in the family Pyramidellidae, the pyrams and their allies.
