= Odostomia clementensis =

Scientific classification
- Kingdom: Animalia
- Phylum: Mollusca
- Class: Gastropoda
- Family: Pyramidellidae
- Genus: Odostomia
- Species: O. clementensis

Binomial name
- Odostomia clementensis Bartsch, 1927

Species of gastropod

Odostomia clementensis is a species of sea snail, a marine gastropod mollusc in the family Pyramidellidae, the pyrams and their allies.
