= Odostomia puelchana =

Scientific classification
- Kingdom: Animalia
- Phylum: Mollusca
- Class: Gastropoda
- Family: Pyramidellidae
- Genus: Odostomia
- Species: O. puelchana

Binomial name
- Odostomia puelchana Castellanos, 1982

Species of gastropod

Odostomia puelchana is a species of sea snail, a marine gastropod mollusc in the family Pyramidellidae, the pyrams and their allies.
