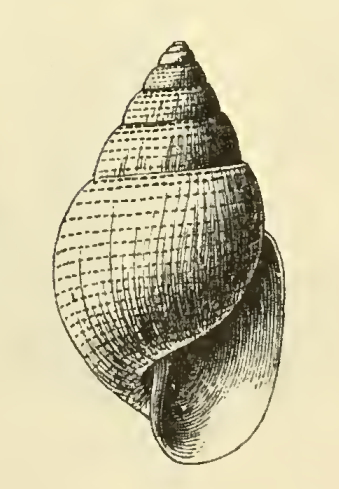
- Drawing of a shell of Acteon danaida

Scientific classification
- Kingdom: Animalia
- Phylum: Mollusca
- Class: Gastropoda
- Superfamily: Acteonoidea
- Family: Acteonidae
- Genus: Acteon
- Species: A. danaida

Binomial name
- Acteon danaida Dall, 1881

Synonyms
- Actaeon danaida Dall, 1881

= Acteon danaida =

Species of marine gastropod

Acteon danaida, common name Rehder's baby bubble, is a species of sea snail, a marine gastropod mollusc in the family Acteonidae.

== Description ==
The length of the shell varies between 5 mm and 10 mm.

(Original description) The elongated, white shell is moderately pointed and is polished. It has about six whorls. The spiral sculpture consists of (on the spire) six, or (on the body whorl) over twenty-five punctate grooves, more crowded anteriorly, but with two or three coarser than the rest, just in advance of the suture. Between these original grooves in the latter half of the body whorl intercalary single or double grooves appear, which are seldom quite as deep as the originals, and at first are not punctate, but at last, and especially near the anterior extreme of the shell, become nearly as well marked as the original series. The transverse sculpture consists only of lines of growth, by a peculiar thickening of certain of which when they cross the grooves the punctate appearance is produced. The minute protoconch is eroded. The suture is appressed and distinct, but the thin appressed anterior margin seems peculiarly liable to erosion, which, in some cases takes place so as to produce the appearance of a channelled suture. The whorls are slightly rounded. The outer lip is thin, simple, somewhat produced in the middle, passing imperceptibly into the thin twisted columella, which is slightly reflected, and bears one inconspicuous, very oblique fold. The body of the shell has a thin layer of callus. The aperture is rounded in front, rather narrow and pointed behind. There is no umbilical chink in this species.

== Distribution ==
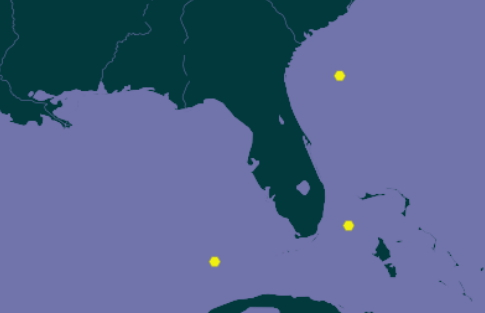
Distribution

This marine species occurs in the Western Atlantic Ocean off North Carolina; in the Caribbean Sea off Cuba.
