= Acteon baracoensis =

Scientific classification
- Kingdom: Animalia
- Phylum: Mollusca
- Class: Gastropoda
- Superfamily: Acteonoidea
- Family: Acteonidae
- Genus: Acteon
- Species: A. baracoensis

Binomial name
- Acteon baracoensis Espinosa & Ortea, 2014

Species of marine gastropod

Acteon baracoensis is a species of sea snail, a marine gastropod mollusc in the family Acteonidae.

== Distribution ==
This marine species occurs in the Caribbean Sea off Cuba.
