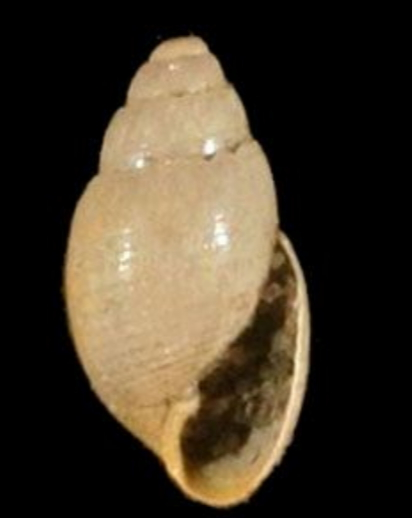
- Shell of † Acteon arnumensis (specimen at the Natural History Museum, Rotterdam)

Scientific classification
- Kingdom: Animalia
- Phylum: Mollusca
- Class: Gastropoda
- Family: Acteonidae
- Genus: Acteon
- Species: †A. arnumensis

Binomial name
- †Acteon arnumensis Sorgenfrei, 1958
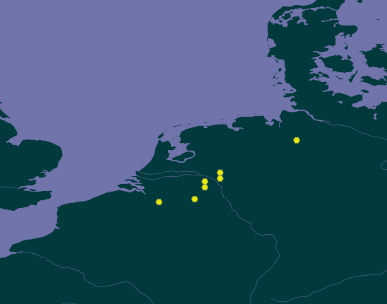

= Acteon arnumensis =

Extinct species of gastropods

Acteon arnumensis is an extinct species of sea snail, a marine gastropod mollusc in the family Acteonidae.

== Description ==
The length of the shell attains 3 mm.

== Distribution ==
Fossils of this marine species have been found in strata of the Middle Miocene strata of South Jutland, Danmark; also in the Netherlands, Belgium and Germany.
