= Acteon fortis =

Scientific classification
- Kingdom: Animalia
- Phylum: Mollusca
- Class: Gastropoda
- Superfamily: Acteonoidea
- Family: Acteonidae
- Genus: Acteon
- Species: A. fortis

Binomial name
- Acteon fortis Thiele, 1925

Synonyms
- Actaeon fortis Thiele, 1925 (incorrect spelling of genus name)

Species of marine gastropod

Acteon fortis is a species of sea snail, a marine gastropod mollusc in the family Acteonidae.

== Description ==
The length of the shell varies between 7 mm and 17 mm.

== Distribution ==
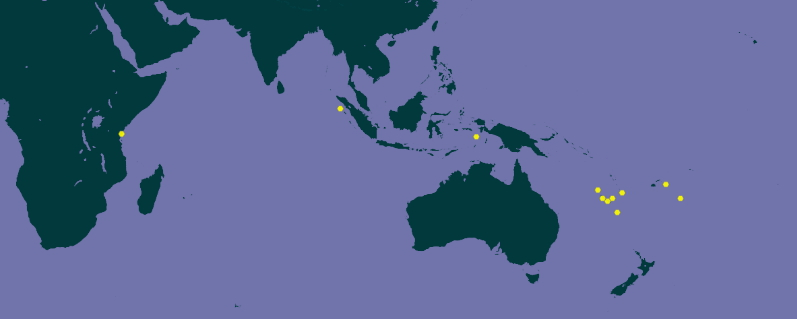
Distribution

This marine species occurs off South Africa and the Philippines, Indonesia, Tonga, Fiji, Vanuatu, and New Caledonia.
