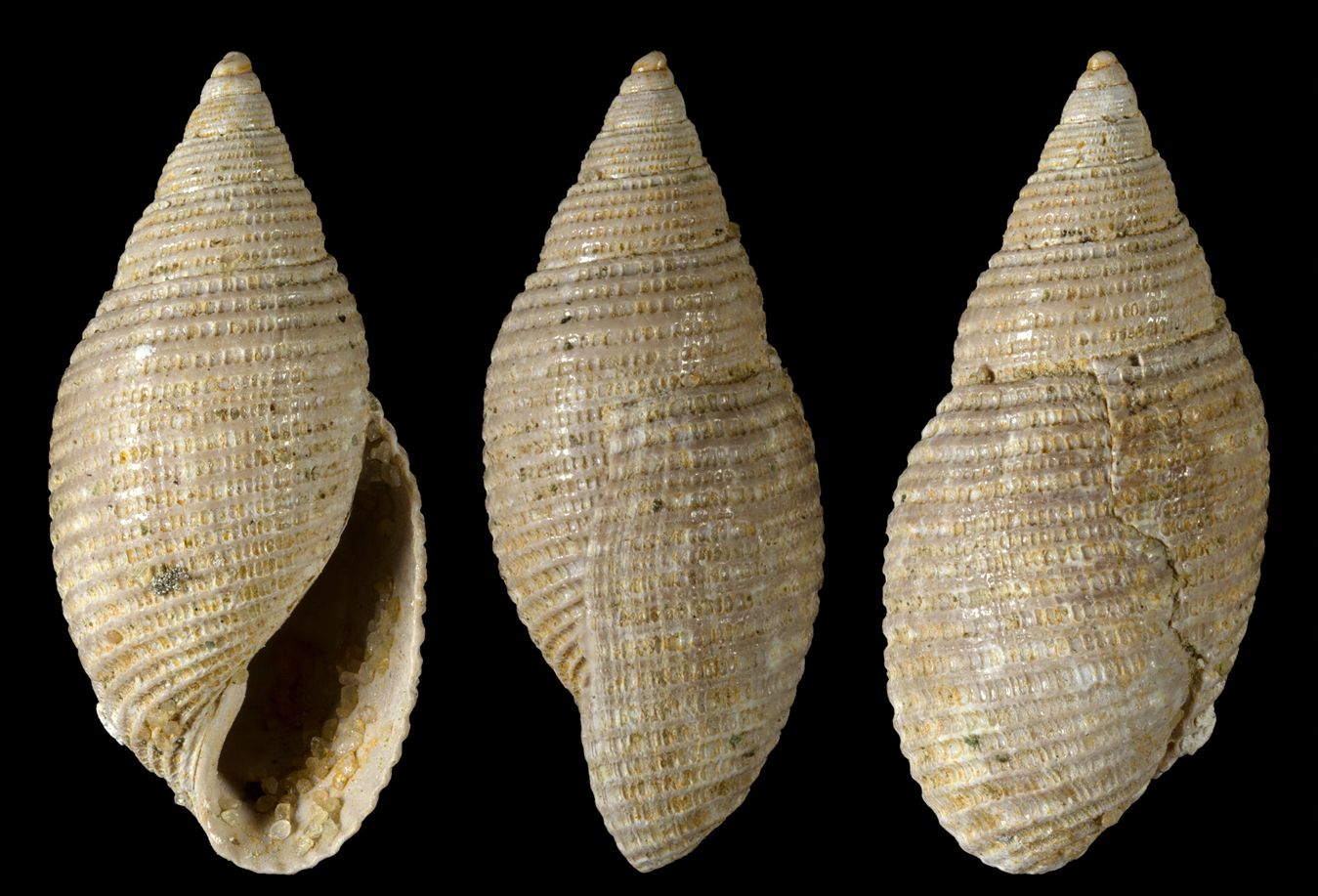
- Shell of † Acteon subinflatus (specimen at MNHN, Paris)

Scientific classification
- Kingdom: Animalia
- Phylum: Mollusca
- Class: Gastropoda
- Superfamily: Acteonoidea
- Family: Acteonidae
- Genus: Acteon
- Species: †A. subinflatus

Binomial name
- †Acteon subinflatus A. d'Orbigny, 1850

Synonyms
- † Acteon laetus (Deshayes, 1862); † Tornatella ferussaci Deshayes, 1862 junior objective synonym; † Tornatella laeta Deshayes, 1862 junior subjective synonym

= Acteon subinflatus =

Extinct species of gastropods

Acteon subinflatus is an extinct species of sea snail, a marine gastropod mollusc in the family Acteonidae.

== Distribution ==
Fossils of this marine species have been found in Eocene strata in Picardy, France.
