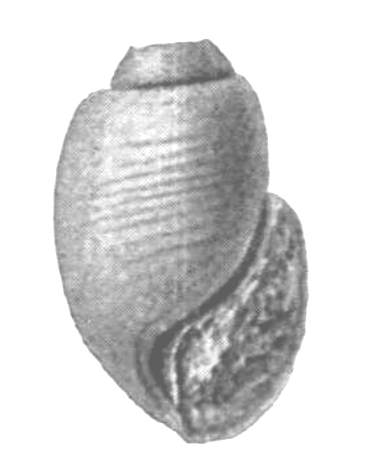
- Shell of † Acteon gabbana (holotype)

Scientific classification
- Kingdom: Animalia
- Phylum: Mollusca
- Class: Gastropoda
- Superfamily: Acteonoidea
- Family: Acteonidae
- Genus: Acteon
- Species: †A. gabbana

Binomial name
- †Acteon gabbana Whitfield, 1892

Synonyms
- † Actaeon gabbana Whitfield, 1892; † Acteon biplicatus (Gabb, 1860) (treated by Gabb as a junior secondary homonym of Acteon biplicatus (Melleville, 1843); Acteon gabbana is a replacement name); † Acteonina biplicata Gabb, 1860

= Acteon gabbana =

Extinct species of gastropods

Acteon gabbana is an extinct species of sea snail, a marine gastropod mollusc in the family Acteonidae.

== Description ==
(Original description) The longitudinally subovate shell has a very short, obtuse spire. The imperfection of the specimen makes the number of whorls undeterminable. The whorls are gently convex and constitute the greater bulk of the specimen. The aperture is elongate elliptical and fully three times as long as wide. It is rounded below and acute above. The columella apparently contains two folds, both of which are rather obscure and seen only as slight impressions on the surface of the columellar cavity and are situated quite high. The surface is marked by rather fine, spiral lines, coarser on the lower part than above and the surface of the cast is marked by a rather broad depressed spiral band or groove, a little below the suture. Indications of transverse lines of growth are extremely faint.

== Distribution ==
Fossils of this marine species have been found in Cretaceous strata in New Jersey, USA.
