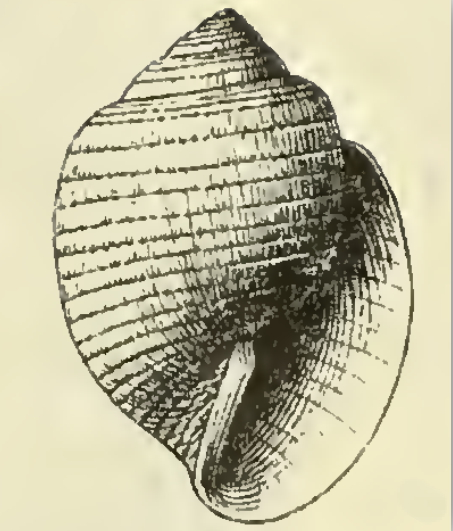
- Drawing of a shell of Acteon melampoides

Scientific classification
- Kingdom: Animalia
- Phylum: Mollusca
- Class: Gastropoda
- Superfamily: Acteonoidea
- Family: Acteonidae
- Genus: Acteon
- Species: A. melampoides

Binomial name
- Acteon melampoides Dall, 1881

Synonyms
- Actaeon melampoides Dall, 1881

= Acteon melampoides =

Species of marine gastropod

Acteon melampoides is a species of sea snail, a marine gastropod mollusc in the family Acteonidae.

== Description ==
The length of the shell attains 6 mm, its diameter 4 mm.

(Original description) The short, stout shell is white. It has a depressed spire and shouldered body whorl. It contains five whorls. They are sculptured with punctate spiral lines. The protoconch is small and eroded. The other whorls show two, three, or (on the body whorl) twenty to twenty-five spiral lines, which are distinctly punctate, with about ten punctations in the length of a millimeter. The spirals are crowded just in advance of the suture and near the columella, and especially distant on the shoulder of the body whorl. The suture is distinct, with the anterior margin finely crenulate in the body whorl. The other sculpture consists of fine lines of growth and microscopic revolving striae. The outer lip is hardly oblique, joining the body at a wider angle than usual, owing to the shouldering of the body whorl. It is thin, simple, passing imperceptibly into the short, twisted columella, which bears a single distinct fold. The body whorl shows only a glaze, columella hardly or not at all thickened. The aperture is approximately lunate.

== Distribution ==
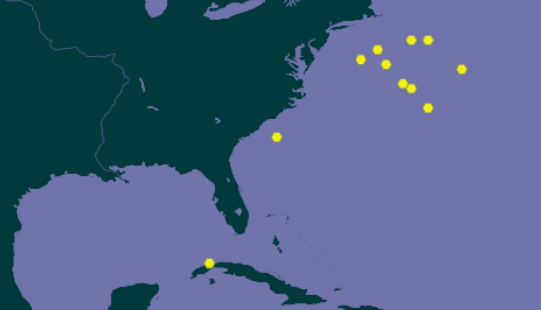
Distribution

This marine species occurs in the Western Atlantic Ocean off Virginia, USA; in the Caribbean Sea off Saint Lucia.
