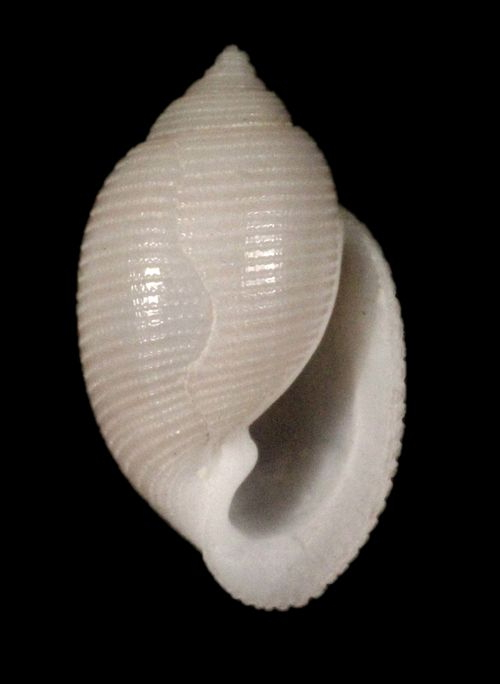
- Shell of Acteon finlayi (specimen at Naturalis Biodiversity Center)

Scientific classification
- Kingdom: Animalia
- Phylum: Mollusca
- Class: Gastropoda
- Superfamily: Acteonoidea
- Family: Acteonidae
- Genus: Acteon
- Species: A. finlayi

Binomial name
- Acteon finlayi McGinty, 1955
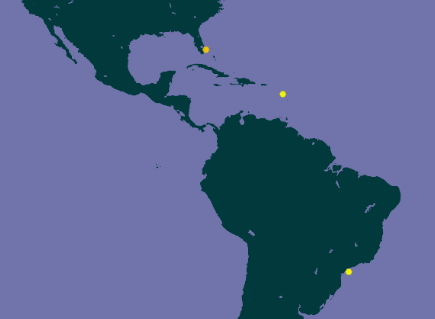

= Acteon finlayi =

Species of marine gastropod

Acteon finlayi is a species of sea snail, a marine gastropod mollusc in the family Acteonidae.

== Description ==
The length of the shell attains 15 mm.

== Distribution ==
This marine species occurs in the Atlantic Ocean off Eastern Florida and Brazil; in the Caribbean Sea off Cuba, the Virgin Islands, Guadeloupe and the Grenadines.
