= Acteon ionfasciatus =

Scientific classification
- Kingdom: Animalia
- Phylum: Mollusca
- Class: Gastropoda
- Superfamily: Acteonoidea
- Family: Acteonidae
- Genus: Acteon
- Species: A. ionfasciatus

Binomial name
- Acteon ionfasciatus Á. Valdés, 2008

Species of marine gastropod

Acteon ionfasciatus is a species of sea snail, a marine gastropod mollusc in the family Acteonidae.

== Description ==
The length of the shell attains 30 mm.

== Distribution ==
This marine species occurs in the Philippines at depths between 448 m and 466 m.
