= Acteon problematicus =

Scientific classification
- Kingdom: Animalia
- Phylum: Mollusca
- Class: Gastropoda
- Family: Acteonidae
- Genus: Acteon
- Species: †A. problematicus

Binomial name
- †Acteon problematicus Landau, Harzhauser, İslamoğlu & C. M. Silva, 2013

Extinct species of gastropods

Acteon problematicus is an extinct species of sea snail, a marine gastropod mollusc in the family Acteonidae.

== Distribution ==
Fossils of this marine species were found in middle Miocene strata in the Karaman Basin, Turkey
