= Acteon nakayamai =

Scientific classification
- Kingdom: Animalia
- Phylum: Mollusca
- Class: Gastropoda
- Superfamily: Acteonoidea
- Family: Acteonidae
- Genus: Acteon
- Species: A. nakayamai

Binomial name
- Acteon nakayamai T. Habe, 1952
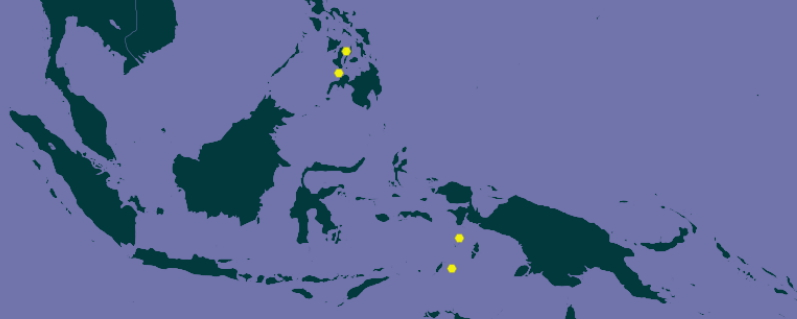

Species of marine gastropod

Acteon nakayamai is a species of sea snail, a marine gastropod mollusc in the family Acteonidae.

== Distribution ==
This marine species occurs off Japan, the Philippines and Indonesia
