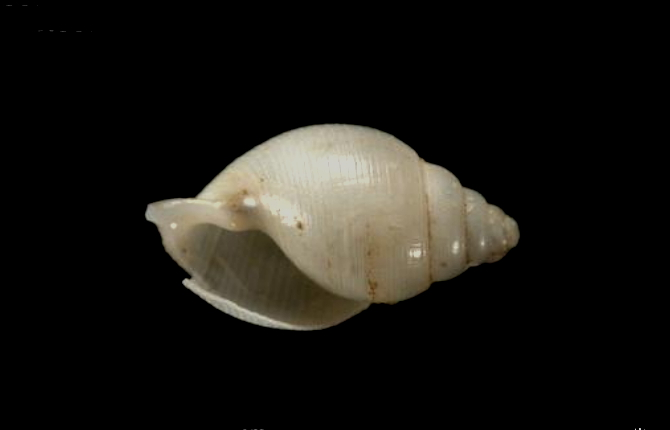
- Shell of Acteon fructuosus (specimen at the Australian Museum)

Scientific classification
- Kingdom: Animalia
- Phylum: Mollusca
- Class: Gastropoda
- Superfamily: Acteonoidea
- Family: Acteonidae
- Genus: Acteon
- Species: A. fructuosus

Binomial name
- Acteon fructuosus Iredale, 1936
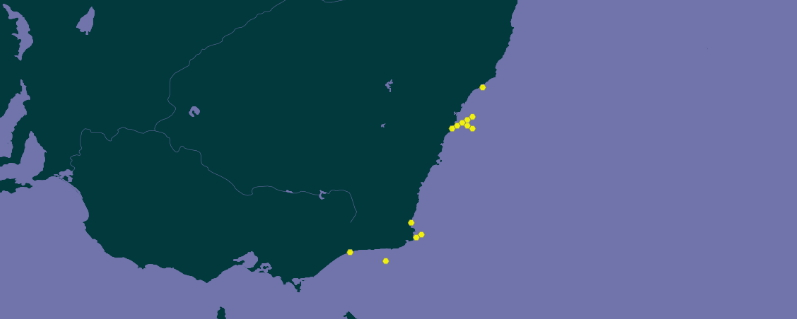

= Acteon fructuosus =

Species of marine gastropod

Acteon fructuosus is a species of sea snail, a marine gastropod mollusc in the family Acteonidae.

== Description ==
The length of the shell attains 6 mm.

== Distribution ==
This marine species is endemic to Australia and occurs off New South Wales and Victoria at depths between 100 m and 150 m.
