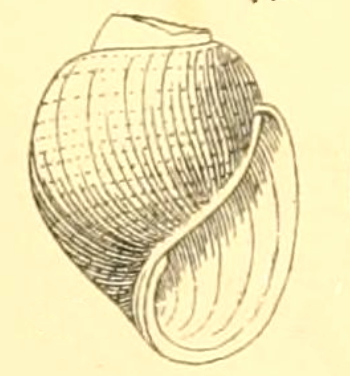
- Shell of Acteon hebes (holotype)

Scientific classification
- Kingdom: Animalia
- Phylum: Mollusca
- Class: Gastropoda
- Superfamily: Acteonoidea
- Family: Acteonidae
- Genus: Acteon
- Species: A. hebes

Binomial name
- Acteon hebes A. E. Verrill, 1885
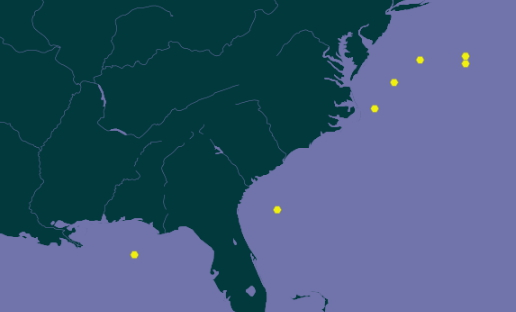

Synonyms
- Actaeon hebes A. E. Verrill, 1885 superseded combination

= Acteon hebes =

Species of marine gastropod

Acteon hebes is a species of sea snail, a marine gastropod mollusc in the family Acteonidae.

== Description ==
The length of the shell attains 8 mm.

(Original description) The white shell is not very small. It is short, stout and swollen. It is broad-ovate in form, with a short spire, (the apex is eroded in both our specimens). The body whorl is large, swollen, and constitutes the greater part of the shell. The suture is deeply impressed or slightly channeled. The whorl just below rises abruptly with a convex outline. The penultimate whorl is short, convex, and is surrounded by about three or four punctate grooves. The body whorl is strongly convex, but very slightly flattened in the middle, its upper portion decidedly swollen. It is covered by about twenty well-marked, revolving grooves, which are closely and very distinctly punctate, the punctations arranged very close together or in contact, and nearly uniform in size. The intervals between the grooves are rather broad and even, with a somewhat lustrous, nearly smooth surface, crossed by slightly sinuous lines of growth. The aperture is ear-shaped, rather broad, narrowed and rounded at the posterior angles, broadly rounded in front, with the inner margin sinuous and strongly excavated at the base of the columella, on which there is an oblique, slightly elevated, obtuse fold.

== Distribution ==
This marine species occurs in the Atlantic Ocean off North Carolina and Georgia, USA. This is a deep-sea species, found at depths between 800 m and 4700 m.
