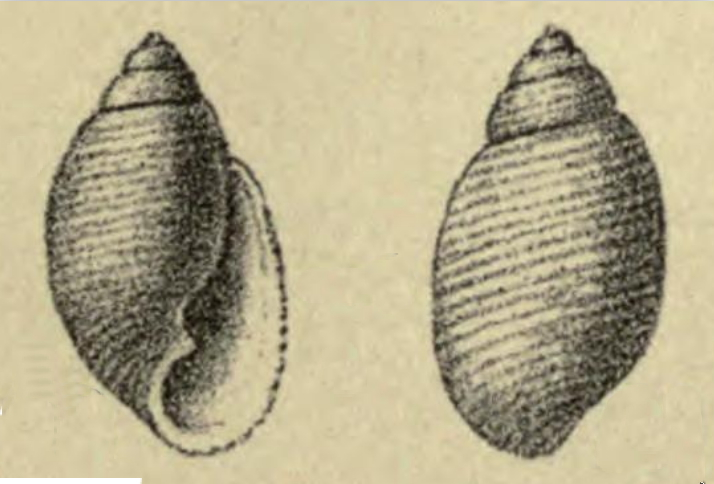
- Drawing of a shell of Acteon pudicus

Scientific classification
- Kingdom: Animalia
- Phylum: Mollusca
- Class: Gastropoda
- Superfamily: Acteonoidea
- Family: Acteonidae
- Genus: Acteon
- Species: A. pudicus

Binomial name
- Acteon pudicus A. Adams, 1855
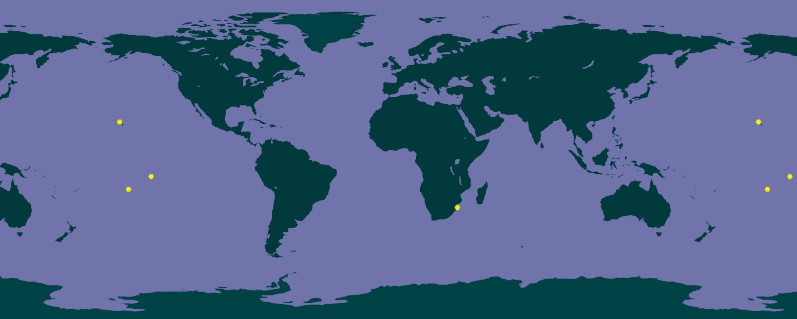

Synonyms
- Actaeon pudicus A. Adams, 1855superseded combination; Pupa pudica (A. Adams, 1855)

= Acteon pudicus =

Species of marine gastropod

Acteon pudicus is a species of sea snail, a marine gastropod mollusc in the family Acteonidae.

== Description ==
The oval shell is subcylindrical, subumbilicate and solid. it is dull whitish, a little flesh tinted. The spire is a little elevated. The whorls are convex, transversely grooved, the grooves equal, punctate. The aperture is oblong. The columella is strongly uniplicate.

== Distribution ==
This marine species has a wide distribution and occurs off South Africa, the Philippines, Guam and in French Polynesia.
