= Acteon sorgenfreii =

Scientific classification
- Kingdom: Animalia
- Phylum: Mollusca
- Class: Gastropoda
- Superfamily: Acteonoidea
- Family: Acteonidae
- Genus: Acteon
- Species: †A. sorgenfreii

Binomial name
- †Acteon sorgenfreii Glibert, 1962

Extinct species of gastropods

Acteon sorgenfreii is an extinct species of sea snail, a marine gastropod mollusc in the family Acteonidae.

== Distribution ==
Fossils of this marine species have been found in Miocene strata in Werder, Lower Saxony, Germany.
