= Acteon retusus =

Scientific classification
- Kingdom: Animalia
- Phylum: Mollusca
- Class: Gastropoda
- Superfamily: Acteonoidea
- Family: Acteonidae
- Genus: Acteon
- Species: A. retusus

Binomial name
- Acteon retusus Verco, 1907

Species of marine gastropod

Acteon retusus, common name the notched acteon, is a species of sea snail, a marine gastropod mollusc in the family Acteonidae.

== Description ==
The length of the shell attains 9.4 mm, its diameter 6.1 mm.

(Original description) The thin, oval shell is shining and translucent. It is yellowish-white. It contains six whorls. The protoconch consists of one whorl. The immersed apex is convex, quite smooth, and ends abruptly in an oblique retrocurrent scar. The whorls of the spire are roundly shouldered immediately below the suture, then convexly sloping. The suture is deeply narrowly channelled. The body whorl is roundly-obliquely cylindrical. The aperture is obliquely arcuately pyriform. The outer lip is simple, smooth inside, finely-crinkled outside and very slightly compressed above its centre. The basal lip is well-rounded, its inner half distinctly everted. The columella has a wide, simple oblique fold just below the base of the body whorl, over which the thin inner lip is applied to join the labrum at the suture. The umbilicus is small.

There are six spiral incisions in the penultimate whorl, forty in the body whorl, extending to the columella, where they become crowded and fine. Very delicate, close-set, axial striae cross the incisions, which they punctate, climb, and crenulate their sides, and traverse the intervening fiat spiral bands.

== Distribution ==
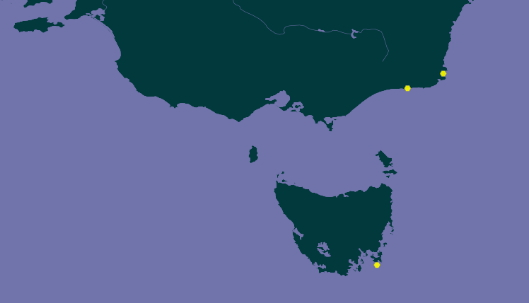
Distribution

This marine species is endemic to Australia and lives in offshore waters off South Australia Tasmania and Victoria at depths between 150 m and 200 m.
