= Acteon petricolus =

Scientific classification
- Kingdom: Animalia
- Phylum: Mollusca
- Class: Gastropoda
- Superfamily: Acteonoidea
- Family: Acteonidae
- Genus: Acteon
- Species: †A. petricolus

Binomial name
- †Acteon petricolus Darragh, 1997

Species of marine gastropod

Acteon petricolus is an extinct species of sea snail, a marine gastropod mollusc in the family Acteonidae.

== Description ==
The length of the shell attains 9.5 mm, its diameter 5 mm.

== Distribution ==
Fossils of this marine species is have been found in Paleocene strata in Victoria, Australia.
