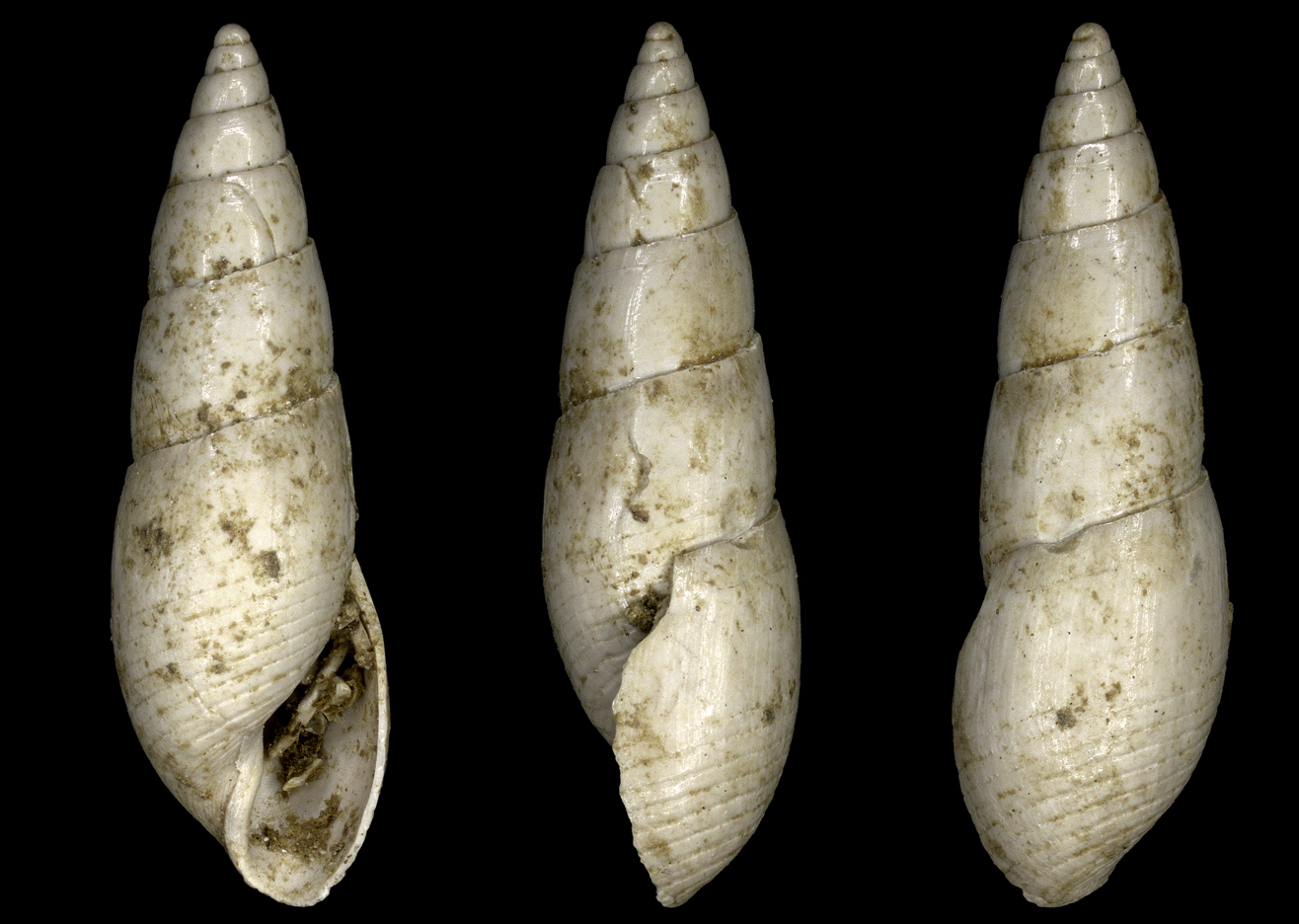
- Shell of Acteon olivellaeformis (syntype)

Scientific classification
- Kingdom: Animalia
- Phylum: Mollusca
- Class: Gastropoda
- Family: Acteonidae
- Genus: Acteon
- Species: †A. olivellaeformis

Binomial name
- †Acteon olivellaeformis (Tate, 1893)

Synonyms
- † Actaeon olivellaeformiss (Tate, 1893)

= Acteon olivellaeformis =

Extinct species of gastropods

Acteon olivellaeformis is an extinct species of sea snail, a marine gastropod mollusc in the family Acteonidae.

== Distribution ==
Fossils of this marine species have been found in Miocene strata in Victoria, Australia
