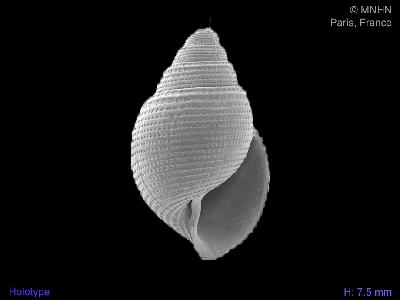

Scientific classification
- Kingdom: Animalia
- Phylum: Mollusca
- Class: Gastropoda
- Superfamily: Acteonoidea
- Family: Acteonidae
- Genus: Acteon
- Species: A. cohibilis

Binomial name
- Acteon cohibilis Á. Valdés, 2008

= Acteon cohibilis =

Species of marine gastropod

Acteon cohibilis is a species of sea snail, a marine gastropod mollusc in the family Acteonidae.

== Description ==
The length of the shell attains 7.5 mm. It has a cone like structure at the top with 3 rings at one end and an aperture at the other end.

== Distribution ==
This marine species occurs in the Pacific Ocean, off New Caledonia at depths between 400 m and 685 m.
