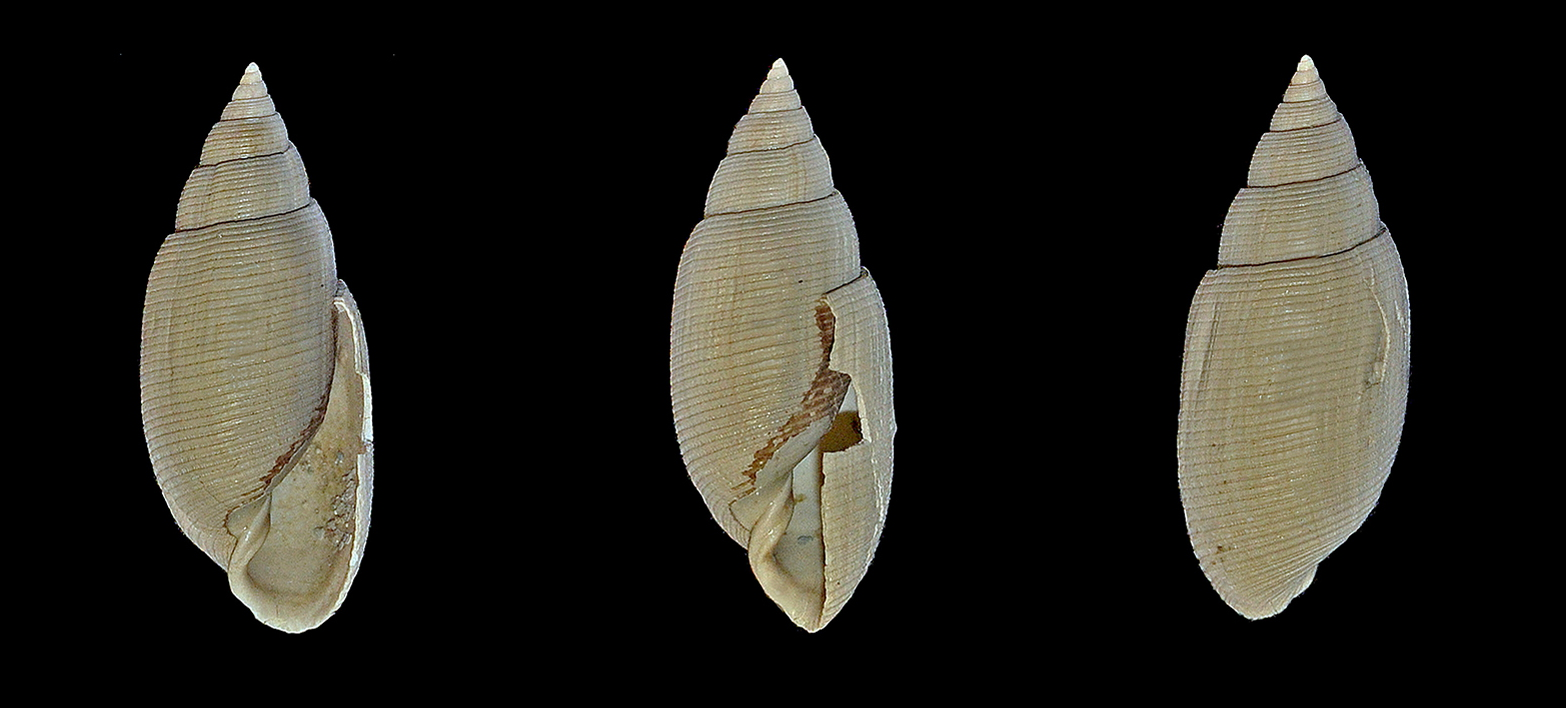
- Shell of Acteon octavii (syntype)

Scientific classification
- Kingdom: Animalia
- Phylum: Mollusca
- Class: Gastropoda
- Family: Acteonidae
- Genus: Acteon
- Species: †A. octavii

Binomial name
- †Acteon octavii (Vasseur, 1882)

Synonyms
- † Actaeon octavii Vasseur, 1882 superseded combination; † Tornatella octavii Vasseur, 1882

= Acteon octavii =

Extinct species of gastropods

Acteon octavii is an extinct species of sea snail, a marine gastropod mollusc in the family Acteonidae.

== Distribution ==
Fossils of this marine species have been found in Eocene strata in Loire-Atlantique, France.
