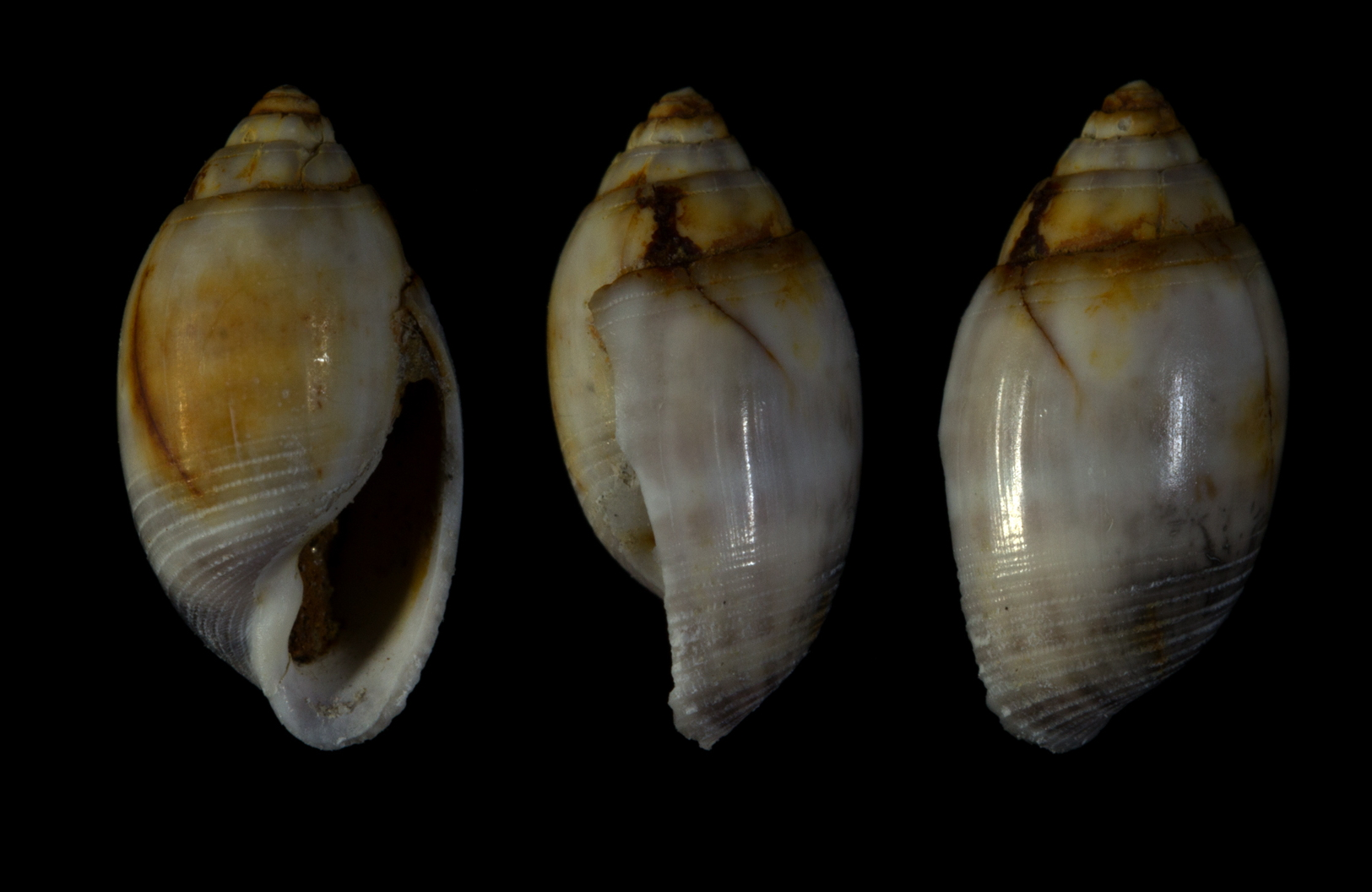
- Shell of † Acteon semistriatus (specimen at MNHN, Paris)

Scientific classification
- Kingdom: Animalia
- Phylum: Mollusca
- Class: Gastropoda
- Superfamily: Acteonoidea
- Family: Acteonidae
- Genus: Acteon
- Species: †A. semistriatus

Binomial name
- †Acteon semistriatus (Basterot, 1825)

Synonyms
- † Acteon clathratus Millet, 1865; † Tornatella semistriata Basterot, 1825 (original combination)

= Acteon semistriatus =

Extinct species of gastropods

Acteon semistriatus is an extinct species of sea snail, a marine gastropod mollusc in the family Acteonidae.

== Distribution ==
Fossils of this marine species have been found in Pliocene strata in the Alpes-Maritimes, France
