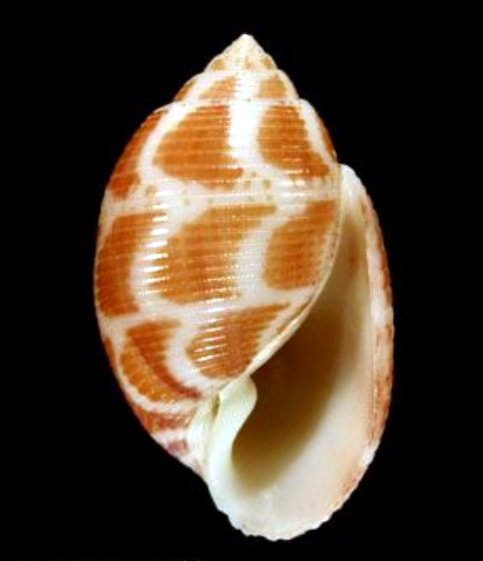
- Shell of Acteon cebuanus (specimen at the Natural History Museum, Rotterdam)

Scientific classification
- Kingdom: Animalia
- Phylum: Mollusca
- Class: Gastropoda
- Superfamily: Acteonoidea
- Family: Acteonidae
- Genus: Acteon
- Species: A. cebuanus

Binomial name
- Acteon cebuanus T. C. Lan, 1985

= Acteon cebuanus =

Species of marine gastropod

Acteon cebuanus is a species of sea snail, a marine gastropod mollusc in the family Acteonidae.

== Distribution ==
This marine species occurs off the Philippines.
