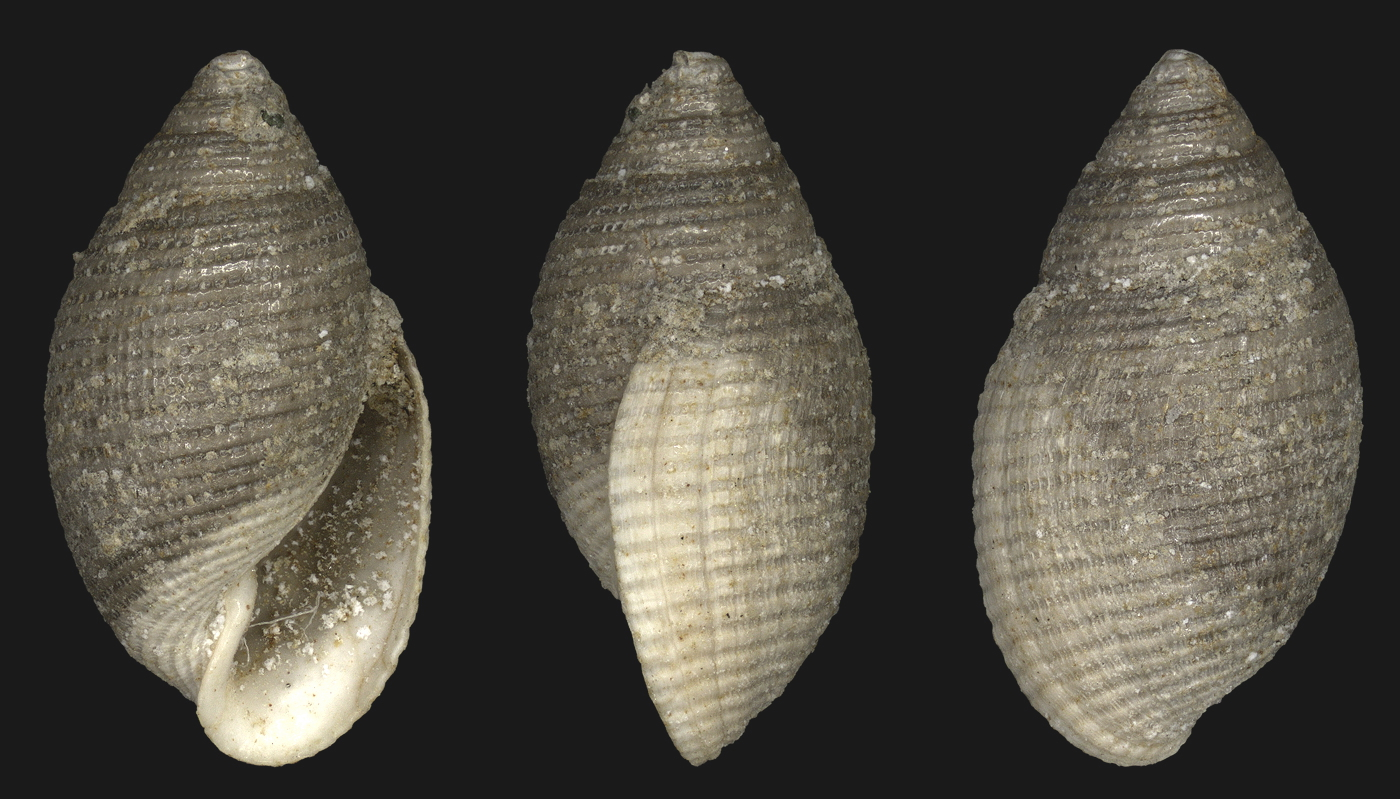
- Shell of † Acteon scrobiculatus (specimen at MNHN, Paris)

Scientific classification
- Kingdom: Animalia
- Phylum: Mollusca
- Class: Gastropoda
- Superfamily: Acteonoidea
- Family: Acteonidae
- Genus: Acteon
- Species: †A. scrobiculatus

Binomial name
- †Acteon scrobiculatus Tenison Woods, 1877

Synonyms
- † Actaeon scrobiculatus Tenison Woods, 1877

= Acteon scrobiculatus =

Extinct species of gastropods

Acteon scrobiculatus is an extinct species of sea snail, a marine gastropod mollusc in the family Acteonidae.

== Description ==
The length of the shell attains 12 mm, its diameter 6 mm.

(Original description) The shell is oblong, ovate and solid. The protoconch is acute and smooth only at the extreme summit. The shell contains seven whorls, cancellate with very distinct spiral lirae, much finer longitudinal striae. The interstices are rounded or punctate. The lirae on the body whorl are broad and subdivided by a fine groove, longitudinal striae subdistant (so that the interstices are transversely oblong) and passing occasionally over the lirae, so as to make them subgranular, especially at the anterior margin. The aperture is subauriform and posteriorly acutely attenuate. The peristome is anteriorly everted and recurved. The plait is conspicuous, solid and obtuse.

== Distribution ==
Fossils of this marine species have been found in Eocene strata in Tasmania, Australia.
