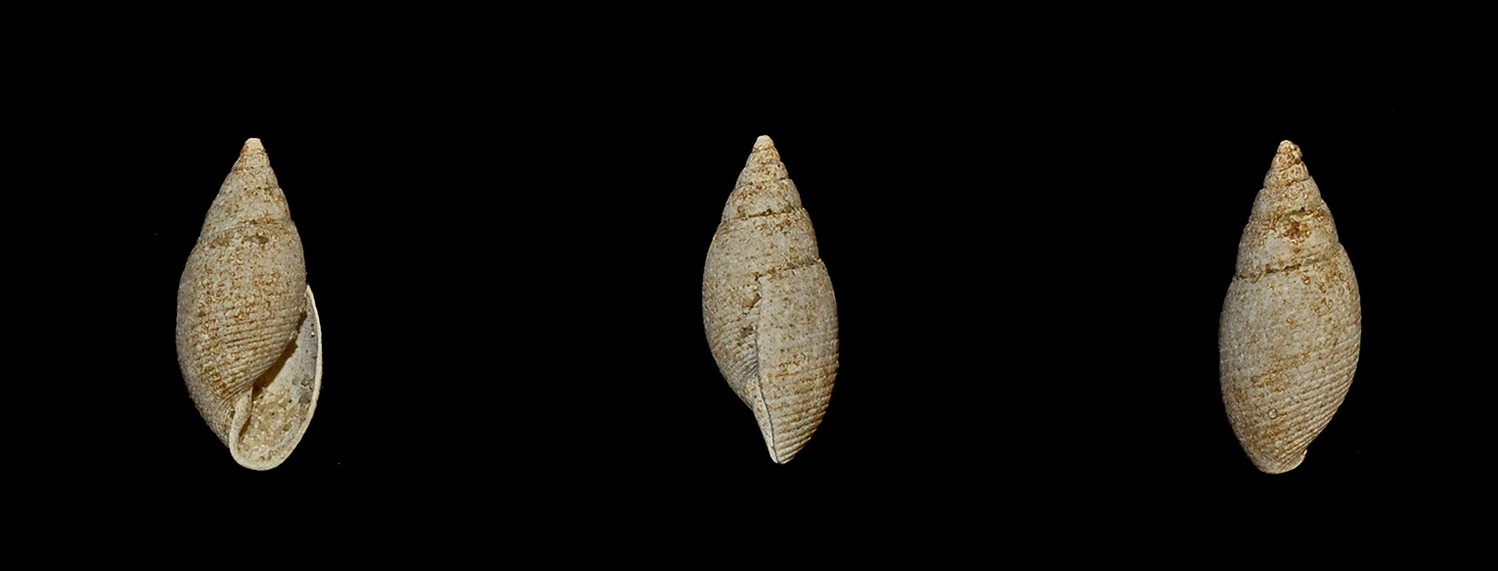
- Shell of † Acteon procerus (specimen at MNHN, Paris)

Scientific classification
- Kingdom: Animalia
- Phylum: Mollusca
- Class: Gastropoda
- Superfamily: Acteonoidea
- Family: Acteonidae
- Genus: Acteon
- Species: †A. procerus

Binomial name
- †Acteon procerus (Deshayes, 1862)

Synonyms
- † Tornatella procera Deshayes, 1862 superseded combination

= Acteon procerus =

Extinct species of gastropods

Acteon procerus is an extinct species of sea snail, a marine gastropod mollusc in the family Acteonidae.

== Distribution ==
Fossils of this marine species have been found in Eocene strata in Picardy, France.
