= Acteon oneroaensis =

Scientific classification
- Kingdom: Animalia
- Phylum: Mollusca
- Class: Gastropoda
- Family: Acteonidae
- Genus: Acteon
- Species: †A. oneroaensis

Binomial name
- †Acteon oneroaensis Powell & Bartrum, 1929

Extinct species of gastropods

Acteon oneroaensis is an extinct species of sea snail, a marine gastropod mollusc in the family Acteonidae.

== Description ==
The length of the shell (spire missing) attains 7.2 mm, its diameter 4.5 mm.

== Distribution ==
Fossils of this marine species have been found in Tertiary strata in Oneroa, Waiheke Island, New Zealand
