= Acteon rhektos =

Scientific classification
- Kingdom: Animalia
- Phylum: Mollusca
- Class: Gastropoda
- Superfamily: Acteonoidea
- Family: Acteonidae
- Genus: Acteon
- Species: A. rhektos

Binomial name
- Acteon rhektos Á. Valdés, 2008

Species of marine gastropod

Acteon rhektos is a species of sea snail, a marine gastropod mollusc in the family Acteonidae.

== Description ==
The length of the shell attains 6 mm.

== Distribution ==
This marine species occurs in the South Pacific off Tonga at depths between 650 m and 670 m.
