= Acteon secale =

Scientific classification
- Kingdom: Animalia
- Phylum: Mollusca
- Class: Gastropoda
- Superfamily: Acteonoidea
- Family: Acteonidae
- Genus: Acteon
- Species: A. secale

Binomial name
- Acteon secale A. Gould, 1859

Synonyms
- Actaeon secale A. Gould, 1859 superseded combination

Species of marine gastropod

Acteon secale is a species of sea snail, a marine gastropod mollusc in the family Acteonidae.

== Description ==
The length of the shell attains 4 mm, its diameter 2 mm.

The thin, small shell is elongate-ovate. It is straw-colored, polished above. It has a subsutural engraved line. It is below encircled with punctate striae. The shell consists of four tabulated whorls. The body whorl measures three-fourths the length of the shell. The apex is obtuse. The aperture slightly exceeds half the shell's length. It is ear-shaped, acute behind, well rounded in front. The columella is conspicuously twisted.

== Distribution ==
This marine species occurs off the Philippines and in the East China Sea.
