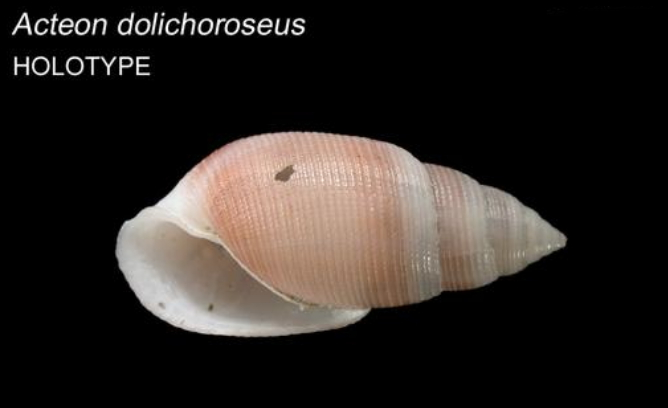
- Shell of Acteon dolichoroseus (specimen at the Australian Museum)

Scientific classification
- Kingdom: Animalia
- Phylum: Mollusca
- Class: Gastropoda
- Superfamily: Acteonoidea
- Family: Acteonidae
- Genus: Acteon
- Species: A. dolichoroseus

Binomial name
- Acteon dolichoroseus Iredale, 1936

= Acteon dolichoroseus =

Species of marine gastropod

Acteon dolichoroseus is a species of sea snail, a marine gastropod mollusc in the family Acteonidae.

== Description ==
The shell of Acteon dolichoroseus is relatively small, with a length that can reach up to 7 mm. The aperture is narrow, and the outer lip is thin and slightly flared.

== Distribution ==
Acteon dolichoroseus is found in the marine waters of the Indo-Pacific region. This species is known to inhabit shallow to moderately deep waters, typically at depths ranging from 10 to 50 meters.
