= Acteon particolor =

Scientific classification
- Kingdom: Animalia
- Phylum: Mollusca
- Class: Gastropoda
- Family: Acteonidae
- Genus: Acteon
- Species: A. particolor

Binomial name
- Acteon particolor Dall, 1927
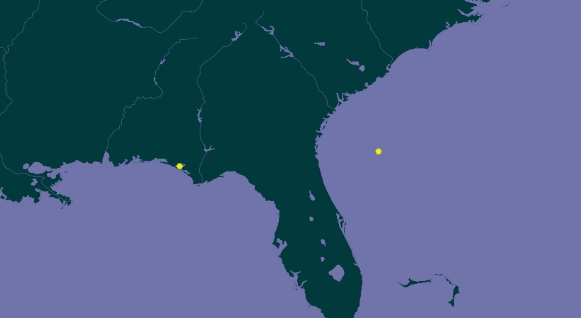

Species of marine gastropod

Acteon particolor is a species of sea snail, a marine gastropod mollusc in the family Acteonidae.

== Description ==
The length of the shell attains 3.5 mm, its diameter 2 mm.

(Original description) The small, short shell is rotund and smooth. It is white and has three brownish spiral bands on the body whorl. The apex is blunt, the protoconch completely immersed. The about four visible whorls are moderately rounded and separated by a distinct suture. The aperture is sublunate. The outer lip is thin, sharp and arcuate, rounding evenly in front to the slightly thickened strongly twisted columella behind which is a minute chink. The body whorl comprises most of the shell.

== Distribution ==
This marine species occurs in the Atlantic Ocean off Florida; in the Caribbean Sea off Missouri, USA.
