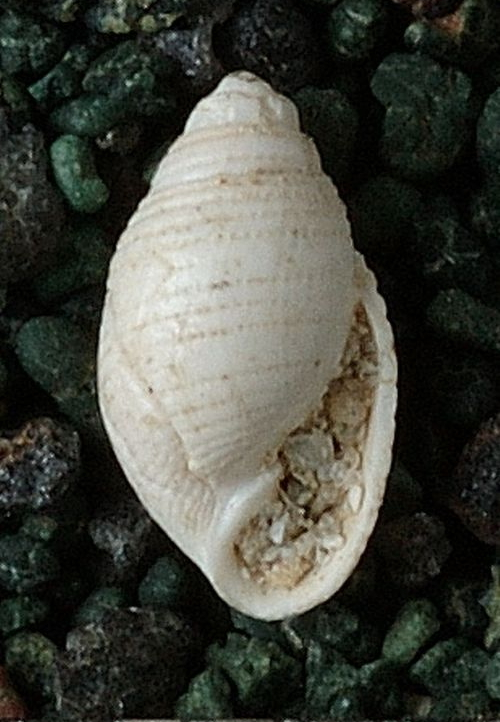
- Shell of † Acteon javanus (holotype at Naturalis Biodiversity Center)

Scientific classification
- Kingdom: Animalia
- Phylum: Mollusca
- Class: Gastropoda
- Superfamily: Acteonoidea
- Family: Acteonidae
- Genus: Acteon
- Species: †A. javanus

Binomial name
- †Acteon javanus (K. Martin, 1884)

Synonyms
- † Actaeon javanus K. Martin, 1884

= Acteon javanus =

Extinct species of gastropods

Acteon javanus is an extinct species of sea snail, a marine gastropod mollusc in the family Acteonidae.

== Distribution ==
Fossils of this marine species have been found in Tertiary strata on Java, Indonesia.
