= Acteon boteroi =

Scientific classification
- Kingdom: Animalia
- Phylum: Mollusca
- Class: Gastropoda
- Superfamily: Acteonoidea
- Family: Acteonidae
- Genus: Acteon
- Species: A. boteroi

Binomial name
- Acteon boteroi Á. Valdés, 2008

Species of marine gastropod

Acteon boteroi is a species of sea snail. It is a marine gastropod mollusc in the family Acteonidae.

== Description ==
The length of the shell attains 12 mm.

Their functional group is benthos.

== Distribution ==
This marine species occurs in the Pacific Ocean, north of New Caledonia typically at a depth between 569 and 650 m.
