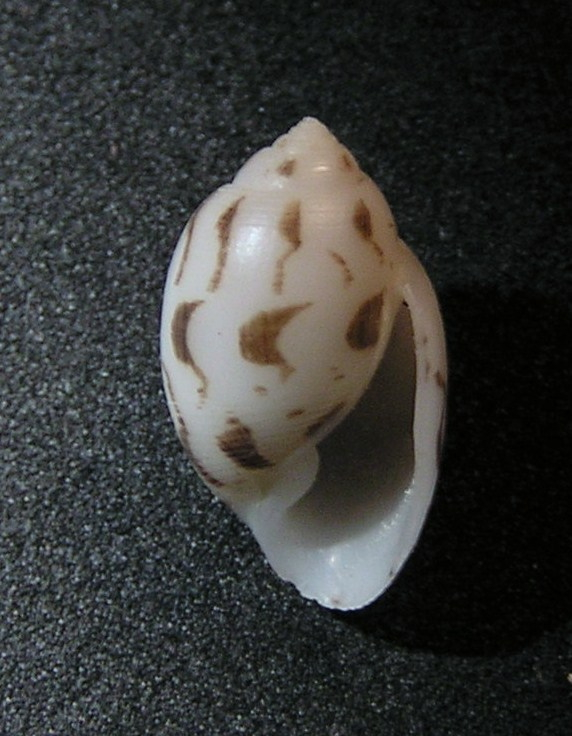
- Shell of Acteon virgatus

Scientific classification
- Kingdom: Animalia
- Phylum: Mollusca
- Class: Gastropoda
- Superfamily: Acteonoidea
- Family: Acteonidae
- Genus: Acteon
- Species: A. virgatus

Binomial name
- Acteon virgatus (Reeve, 1842)

Synonyms
- Tornatella virgata Reeve, 1842 (original combination)

= Acteon virgatus =

Species of marine gastropod

Acteon virgatus is a species of sea snail, a marine gastropod mollusc in the family Acteonidae.

== Description ==
The shell is stoutly ovate. It is transversely finely linearly grooved throughout. It is ivory-white, conspicuously obliquely streaked with black. The spire is short, rather obtuse. The apex is sharp. The columella is one-plaited.

== Distribution ==
This marine species occurs off Japan, Oman and the Philippines.
