= Acteon parallelus =

Scientific classification
- Kingdom: Animalia
- Phylum: Mollusca
- Class: Gastropoda
- Family: Acteonidae
- Genus: Acteon
- Species: A. parallelus

Binomial name
- Acteon parallelus Dall, 1927
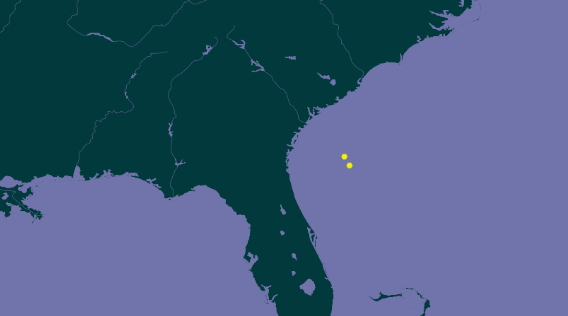

Species of marine gastropod

Acteon parallelus is a species of sea snail, a marine gastropod mollusc in the family Acteonidae.

== Description ==
The length of the shell attains 3 mm, its diameter 1.5 mm.

(Original description) The minute, white shell is subcylindrical. It has an immersed blunt apex and nearly four whorls. The suture is distinct and briefly shouldered. The surface is finely spirally striate, the striae microscopically reticulate by faint incremental lines. The sides of the body whorl are nearly flat. The base of the shell is short and evenly rounded. The outer lip is thin, sharp, straight and anteriorly rounded into the slightly thickened and twisted columella. The base is imperforate in the adult, a slight chink behind the columella in immature specimens.

== Distribution ==
This marine species occurs in the Atlantic Ocean off Georgia, USA.
