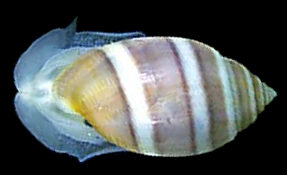
- dorsal view of a live Acteon tornatilis

Scientific classification
- Kingdom: Animalia
- Phylum: Mollusca
- Class: Gastropoda
- Family: Acteonidae
- Genus: Acteon; Montfort, 1810

Type species
- Bulla tornatilis Linnaeus, 1758

Synonyms
- Actaeon Ersch & Gruber, 1818 (unjustified emendation); Acteon (Semiactaeon) Cossmann, 1889 †· accepted, alternate representation; Speo Risso, 1826; Tornatella Lamarck, 1816

= Acteon (gastropod) =

Genus of gastropods

Acteon is a genus of small sea snails, predatory marine gastropod mollusks in the family Acteonidae, the barrel bubble snails.

The genus is named after Acteon, a character in Greek mythology.

== Description ==
The shell is convoluted, ovate, cylindrical, generally transversely striated. The aperture is oblong, entire, somewhat effuse at its base. It shows one or more folds upon the columella. The outer lip is thin, sharp, never having a varix.

The species of this genus are all marine, and convolute. They are almost always transversely striated. They are generally oval and cylindrical. The spire is more or less projecting and obtuse. The aperture is elongated, often narrowed at its posterior part, widened and somewhat effuse at its base. The folds of the columella vary from one to three. They are generally thick and obtuse.

In the genus Acteon, the individual teeth of the radula are very small. There are many teeth in each row.

== Species ==
According to the World Register of Marine Species (WoRMS), the following species with accepted names are included in the genus Acteon:

- Acteon aethiopicus E. von Martens, 1902
- † Acteon aizyensis Deshayes, 1862
- † Acteon antipinguis Harzhauser, Landau and Malaquias, 2026
- Acteon angolensis Poppe & Tagaro, 2023
- Acteon antarcticus Thiele, 1912
- Acteon aphyodes Valdès, 2008
- Acteon archibenthicola Habe, 1955
- Acteon areatus Verco, 1907
- † Acteon arnumensis Sorgenfrei, 1958
- † Acteon articulatus Marwick, 1931
- Acteon baracoensis Espinosa & Ortea, 2014
- † Acteon bezanconi Cossmann, 1889
- † Acteon biplicatus (Melleville, 1843)
- Acteon boteroi Valdès, 2008
- Acteon buccinus Valdès, 2008
- Acteon candens Rehder, 1939
- Acteon castus Hinds, 1844
- Acteon cebuanus Lan, 1985
- † Acteon chattonensis Marwick, 1929
- Acteon chauliodous Valdès, 2008
- † Acteon chevallieri (Deshayes, 1862)
- Acteon chrystomatus Valdès, 2008
- Acteon cohibilis Valdès, 2008
- Acteon comptus Valdès, 2008
- Acteon conicus Thiele, 1925
- † Acteon cretacea Gabb, 1862
- Acteon danaida Dall, 1881
- Acteon dancei Poppe, Tagaro & Stahlschmidt, 2015
- Acteon delicatus Dall, 1889
- † Acteon deshayesi (de Raincourt & Munier-Chalmas, 1863)
- † Acteon distinguendus (Cossmann, 1897)
- Acteon dolichoroseus Iredale, 1936
- † Acteon dudariensis Strausz, 1966
- Acteon editus Valdès, 2008
- † Acteon evanescens (Cossmann, 1897)
- Acteon exiguus Mörch, 1875
- Acteon fasuloi Crocetta, Romani, Simone & Rolán, 2017
- Acteon finlayi McGinty, 1955
- Acteon fortis Thiele, 1925
- Actaeon fragilis Thiele, 1925
- † Acteon frearsianus d'Orbigny, 1845
- Acteon fructuosus Iredale, 1936
- † Acteon funiculifer (Cossmann, 1897)
- † Acteon gabbana Whitfield, 1892
- † Acteon gardneri (Cossmann, 1889)
- † Acteon gilberti (Cossmann, 1889)
- † Acteon glans I. Lea, 1846
- † Acteon gmelini (Bayan, 1870)
- † Acteon graciliratus Beets, 1942
- † Acteon gutta Harzhauser, Landau and Malaquias, 2026
- Acteon hebes A. E. Verrill, 1885
- Acteon herosae Valdès, 2008
- † Acteon houdasi (Cossmann, 1907)
- † Acteon idoneus Conrad, 1833
- Acteon incisus Dall, 1881
- † Acteon inflatus (Stilwell & Zinsmeister, 1992)
- † Acteon infulatus Marwick, 1931
- Acteon ionfasciatus Valdès, 2008
- † Acteon javanus (K. Martin, 1884)
- Acteon juvenis Dall, 1927
- Acteon lacunatus Dall, 1927
- † Acteon laetus (Deshayes, 1862)
- Acteon laetus Thiele, 1925 (Note: accepted > unreplaced junior homonym, secondary junior homonym of † Acteon laetus (Deshayes, 1862))
- † Acteon laevigatus (Grateloup, 1828)
- † Acteon loustaui (Deshayes, 1861)
- Acteon loyautensis Valdès, 2008
- Acteon maltzani Dautzenberg, 1910
- † Acteon marullensis A. d'Orbigny, 1850
- Acteon melampoides Dall, 1881
- Acteon mirim Cunha, 2011
- Acteon modestus Thiele, 1925 (Note: accepted > unreplaced junior homonym, invalid: based on junior primary homonym of Actaeon modestus A. Adams 1855; no replacement name has yet been proposed.)
- Acteon monterosatoi Dautzenberg, 1889
- † Acteon monthiersi (Carez, 1879)
- † Acteon morelletorum (Gougerot & Braillon, 1968)
- Acteon nakayamai Habe, 1952
- † Acteon nitens I. Lea, 1846
- † Acteon novellus Conrad, 1834
- † Acteon octavii (Vasseur, 1882)
- † Acteon olivellaeformis (Tate, 1893)
- † Acteon oneroaensis Powell & Bartrum, 1929
- Acteon osexiguus Valdès, 2008
- † Acteon otamateaensis Laws, 1941
- † Acteon pahaka Maxwell, 1992
- Acteon panamensis Dall, 1908
- Acteon parallelus Dall, 1927
- Acteon particolor Dall, 1927
- Acteon pelecais Marcus, 1972
- Acteon perforatus Dall, 1881
- † Acteon petricolus Darragh, 1997
- † Acteon pomilius Conrad, 1833
- † Acteon problematicus Landau, Harzhauser, İslamoğlu & C. M. Silva, 2013
- † Acteon procerus (Deshayes, 1862)
- † Acteon procratericulatus Laws, 1939
- Acteon profundus Valdès, 2008
- Acteon pudicus (A. Adams), 1854
- Acteon retusus Verco, 1907
- † Acteon romanicus Harzhauser, Landau and Malaquias, 2026
- Acteon rhektos Valdès, 2008
- Acteon ringiculoides Valdès, 2008
- Acteon roseus Hedley, 1906
- † Acteon scrobiculatus Tenison Woods, 1877
- Acteon secale Gould, 1859
- Acteon semisculptus E. A. Smith, 1890
- † Acteon semispiralis P. Marshall, 1917
- † Acteon semistriatus Basterot, 1825
- Acteon senegalensis Petit de la Saussaye, 1851
- Acteon sieboldii Reeve, 1842
- † Acteon sorgenfreii Glibert, 1962
- Acteon soyoae Habe, 1961
- † Acteon sphaericulus (Deshayes, 1862)
- Acteon splendidulus Mörch, 1875
- † Acteon stylifer Cossmann, 1896
- † Acteon subinflatus d'Orbigny, 1850
- Acteon subroseus Iredale, 1936
- † Acteon subscalatus Cossmann, 1897
- † Acteon subtornatilis Pilsbry & C. W. Johnson, 1917
- † Acteon surensis Gerasimov, 1992
- † Acteon trifasciatus Harzhauser, Landau and Malaquias, 2026
- Acteon tornatilis Linnaeus, (1758)
- Acteon traskii Stearns, 1898
- † Acteon turgidus Deshayes, 1862
- Acteon valentina Poppe, Tagaro & Stahlschmidt, 2015
- Acteon vangoethemi Poppe, Tagaro & Stahlschmidt, 2015
- Acteon venustus d'Orbigny, 1840
- Acteon virgatus (Reeve, 1842)
- † Acteon viciani Harzhauser, Landau and Malaquias, 2026
- † Acteon vindobonensis Harzhauser, Landau and Malaquias, 2026
- † Acteon wangaloa Finlay & Marwick, 1937

Taxa inquirenda

- Acteon (Metactaeon) Thiele, 1931
- Acteon mariae A. Adams, 1855
- Acteon minutus (Petterd, 1879)
- Acteon modestus A. Adams, 1855
- Acteon oryza Reeve, 1842 (synonym; Tornatella oryza Reeve, 1842)

== Synonyms ==
- Acteon (Maxacteon) Rudman, 1971: synonym of Maxacteon Rudman, 1971
- Acteon aequatorialis Thiele, 1925: synonym of Metactaeon aequatorialis (Thiele, 1925)
- Acteon albus Sowerby, 1874: synonym of Rictaxis albus (Sowerby III, 1874)
- Acteon amabilis Watson, 1886: synonym of Callostracon amabile (Watson, 1886)
- Acteon augustoi Nobre, 1932: synonym of Acteon tornatilis (Linnaeus, 1758)
- Acteon austrinus Watson, 1881: synonym of Leucotina casta (A. Adams, 1853)
- Acteon browni Jordan, 1895: synonym of Crenilabium exile (Jeffreys, 1870)
- Acteon candidulus Monterosato, 1923: synonym of Acteon tornatilis (Linnaeus, 1758)
- Acteon chariis Watson, 1886: synonym of Callostracon chariis (Watson, 1886)
- Acteon cratericulatus Hedley, 1906: synonym of Maxacteon cratericulatus (Hedley, 1906)
- Acteon cumningii A. Adams, 1855: synonym of Mysouffa cumingii (A. Adams, 1855)
- Acteon curtulus Dall, 1890: synonym of Microglyphis curtula (Dall, 1890)
- Acteon dianae A. Adams, 1855: synonym of Leucotina casta (A. Adams, 1853)
- Acteon elongatus Castellanos, Rolán & Bartolotta, 1987: synonym of Acteon fasuloi Crocetta, Romani, Simone & Rolán, 2017 (invalid: junior homonym of Acteon elongatus J. de C. Sowerby, 1824; A. fasuloi is a replacement name)
- Acteon eloisae [sic]: synonym of Acteon eloiseae Abbott, 1973
- Acteon eloiseae Abbott, 1973; synonym of Punctacteon eloiseae (Abbott, 1973)
- Acteon etheridgii Bell T., 1870: synonym of Crenilabium exile (Jeffreys, 1870)
- Acteon exilis Jeffreys, 1870: synonym of Crenilabium exile (Jeffreys, 1870)
- Acteon fabreanus Crosse, 1873: synonym of Maxacteon fabreanus (Crosse, 1874), synonym of Punctacteon fabreanus (Crosse, 1873)
- Acteon flammea (Gmelin, 1791): synonym of Maxacteon flammeus (Bruguière, 1789)
- Acteon flammeus (Bruguière, 1789): synonym of Maxacteon flammeus (Bruguière, 1789)
- Acteon huttoni Cossmann, 1895: synonym of Leucotina casta (A. Adams, 1853)
- Acteon isabella Poppe, Tagaro & Goto, 2018: synonym of Japonactaeon isabella (Poppe, Tagaro & Goto, 2018) (superseded combination)
- Acteon kajiyamai (Habe, 1976): synonym of Punctacteon kajiyamai Habe, 1976
- Acteon kawamurai Habe, 1952: synonym of Maxacteon kawamurai (Habe, 1952)
- Acteon kirai Habe, 1949: synonym of Punctacteon kirai (Habe, 1949)
- Acteon liostracoides Dall, 1927: synonym of Crenilabium exile (Jeffreys, 1870)
- Acteon longissimus (Valdés, 2008): synonym of Japonactaeon longissimus Valdés, 2008
- Acteon natalensis (Barnard, 1963): synonym of Acteocina fusiformis A. Adams, 1850
- Acteon nipponensis Yamakawa, 1911: synonym of Japonactaeon nipponensis (Yamakawa, 1911)
- Acteon nitidus Verrill, 1882: synonym of Crenilabium exile (Jeffreys, 1870)
- Acteon perconicus Dall, 1890: synonym of Microglyphis perconica (Dall, 1890)
- Acteon pilsbryi Cossmann, 1902: synonym of Pupa affinis (A. Adams, 1855)
- Acteon praestitus Finlay, 1924: synonym of Leucotina casta (A. Adams, 1853)
- Acteon propius Dall, 1927: synonym of Crenilabium exile (Jeffreys, 1870)
- Acteon punctocaelatus(Carpenter, 1864) : synonym of Rictaxis punctocaelatus Carpenter, 1864
- Acteon punctostriatus (C. B. Adams, 1840): synonym of Japonactaeon punctostriatus (C. B. Adams, 1840)
- Acteon pygmaeus Grateloup, 1838: synonym of Chrysallida stefanisi (Jeffreys, 1869)
- † Acteon reticulatus Martin, 1884: synonym of † Pupa reticulata (Martin, 1884)
- Acteon semicingulatus Dall, 1927: synonym of Ondina semicingulata (Dall, 1927) (original combination)
- Acteon semistriatus Glibert, 1952: synonym of Acteon tornatilis (Linnaeus, 1758)
- Actaeon senegalensis von Maltzan, 1885 : synonym of Acteon maltzani Dautzenberg, 1910
- Acteon sieboldii (Reeve 1842): synonym of Japonactaeon sieboldii (Reeve, 1842)
- Acteon subincisus Okutani, 1968: synonym of Punctacteon subincisus (Okutani, 1968) (superseded combination)
- † Acteon subovalis P. Marshall, 1917: synonym of † Tornatellaea subovalis (P. Marshall, 1917) (superseded combination)
- Acteon subulatus Wood S., 1848: synonym of Acteon tornatilis (Linnaeus, 1758)
- Acteon teramachii Habe, 1950: synonym of Punctacteon teramachii (T. Habe, 1950) (superseded combination)
- Acteon torrei Aguayo & Rehder, 1936: synonym of Bullina torrei (Aguayo & Rehder, 1936)
- Acteon vagabundus Mabille & de Rochebrune, 1885: synonym of Toledonia vagabunda (Mabille, 1885)
- Acteon variegatus (Bruguiere, 1789): synonym of Punctacteon variegatus (Bruguière, 1789)
- † Acteon wetherellii Lea, 1833: synonym of Acteocina canaliculata (Say, 1826)
- Acteon yamamurae Habe, 1976: synonym of Punctacteon yamamurae T. Habe, 1976 (superseded combination)

The Indo-Pacific molluscan Database also includes the following species:

- Acteon edentulus Watson, 1883
- Acteon lactuca
- Acteon minutus
- Acteon pulchrior Melvill, 1904

The Integrated Taxonomic Information System (ITIS) also includes the following species:

- Acteon pusillus (Forbes, 1844)

- Acteon aethiopicus Martens, E.C. von, 1902
- Acteon antarcticus Thiele, 1912
  - Distribution : subantarctic
  - Length : 6.6 mm
  - Description : found at depths of 120 to 340 m
- Acteon archibenthicola Habe, 1955
  - Distribution : Indo-Pacific
- Acteon biplicatus Strebel, 1908
  - Distribution : subantarctic, Argentina, Falkland Islands, Tierra del Fuego
  - Length : 4.4 mm
  - Description : found at depths of 16 to 150 m
- Acteon candens Rehder, 1939 Rehder’s baby bubble
  - Distribution : Caribbean, Gulf of Mexico, North Carolina, Florida, Western Atlantic Ocean.
  - Length; 10 mm
  - Description : found at depths of 10 to 20 m; glossy white shell with five whorls; body whorl contains at the base three brown spiraling bands; the top of each whorl has a narrow brown band.
- Acteon castus Hinds, 1844
  - Distribution : West America
- Acteon cumingii Adams, 1854 (taxon inquirendum)
  - Distribution : Brazil, Florida
  - Length : 10–20 mm
  - Description : found at depths of 10 to 360 m; lightbrown shell with a large first whorl; each whorl with many spiral windings.; outer lip notched.
- Acteon danaida Dall, 1881
  - Distribution : Georgia, Caribbean, NE Brazil
  - Length : 11 mm
  - Description :.found at depths of 370 to 620 m; white translucent shell with five whorls.
- Acteon delicatus Dall, 1889
  - Distribution :Florida, Caribbean, Gulf of Mexico.
  - Length : 10 mm
  - Description : found at depths of 135 to 565 m
- Acteon dolichoroseus Iredale, 1936
  - Distribution : Indo-Pacific
- Acteon edentulus Watson, 1883
  - Distribution : Indo-Pacific
- Acteon elongatus Castellanos, Rolán & Bartolotta, 1987
  - Distribution : Argentina
  - Length : 8.5 mm
  - Description : found at depths of 150 to 600 m
- Acteon exiguus Mörch, 1875
  - Distribution : Venezuela, Surinam.
  - Length : 6.5 mm
  - Description : found at depths of 14 to 18 m
- Acteon finlayi McGinty, 1955
  - Distribution : Florida, Caribbean
  - Length : 12 mm
  - Description : found at depths up to 360 m
- Acteon fortis Thiele, 1925
  - Distribution : Indo-Pacific
- Acteon hebes A. E. Verrill, 1885
  - Distribution : Georgia, North Carolina.
  - Length : 8 mm
  - Description : deepsea species; found at depths of 800 to 4700 m
- Acteon incisus Dall, 1881
  - Distribution : Georgia, Mexico, Cuba
  - Length : 10 mm
  - Description : found at depths of 30 to 1170 m
- Acteon juvenis Dall, 1927
  - Distribution : Georgia
  - Length : 3 mm
  - Description : found at depths of over 500 m
- Acteon lacunatus Dall, 1927
  - Distribution : Georgia
  - Length : 3 mm
  - Description : found at depths of 800 m
- Acteon mariae A. Adams, 1855 (taxon inquirendum)
  - Distribution : Indo-Pacific
- Acteon melampoides Dall, 1881
  - Distribution : Virginia, Florida, Caribbean
  - Length : 9.6 mm
  - Description : deepsea species; found at depths of 400 to 4700 m
- Acteon minutus (author unknown)
  - Distribution : Indo-Pacific
- Acteon monterosatoi Dautzenberg, 1889
  - Distribution : Europe, Mediterranean, Azores
- Acteon nakayamai Habe, 1952
  - Distribution : Japan
- Acteon panamensis Dall, 1908
  - Distribution : Panama
- Acteon parallelus Dall, 1927
  - Distribution : Georgia
  - Length : 3 mm
  - Description : found at depths of 530 to 800 m
- Acteon particolor Dall, 1927
  - Distribution : Georgia
  - Length : 3.5 mm
  - Description : found at depths of 800 m
- Acteon pelecais Marcus, 1972
  - Distribution : Brazil
  - Length : 9.5 mm
  - Description : found at depths to 85 m
- Acteon perforatus Dall, 1881
  - Distribution : Mexico, Cuba
  - Length : 14 mm
  - Description : found at depths of 330 to 1450 m
- Acteon proprius Dall, 1927
  - Distribution : America, Georgia.
  - Length : 4.3 mm
- Acteon pudicus Adams, 1854
  - Distribution : Indo-Pacific
- Acteon pulchrior Melvill, 1904
  - Distribution : Indo-Pacific
- Acteon retusus Verco, 1907
  - Distribution : Australia
- Acteon roseus Hedley, 1906
  - Distribution : Indo-Pacific
- Acteon semicingulatus Dall, 1927
  - Distribution : Georgia
  - Length : 3 mm
  - Description : found at depths of 500 m
- Acteon semisculptus E. A. Smith, 1890
  - Distribution : Eastern Atlantic, St. Helena
  - Length : 4 mm
- Acteon senegalensis Petit de la Saussaye
  - Distribution : West Africa
- Acteon soyoae Habe, 1961
  - Distribution : Indo-Pacific
- Acteon splendidulus Mörch, 1875
  - Distribution : Caribbean
  - Length : 4.8 mm
- Acteon subincisus Okutani, 1968
  - Distribution : Indo-Pacific
- Acteon subroseus Iredale, 1936
  - Distribution : Indo-Pacific
- Acteon teramachii Habe, 1950
  - Distribution : Indo-Pacific
- Acteon tornatilis Linnaeus, 1767 Lathe acteon
- Acteon traskii Stearns, 1897
  - Distribution : California, Panama
  - Length : 18 mm
- Acteon venustus d'Orbigny, 1840
  - Distribution : West America
- Acteon virgatus (= Punctacteon virgatus) Reeve, 1842 Striped acteon
  - Distribution : SW Pacific
  - Length : 25 mm
  - Description : cream-colored convex shell with five whorls with many spiral grooves; transversely decorated with wavy darkbrown bands.
