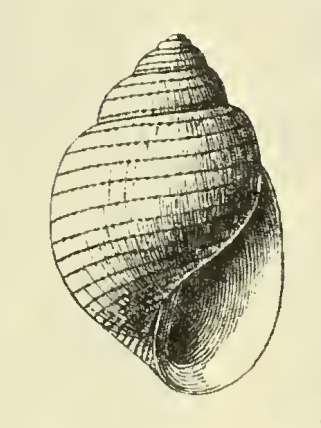
- Drawing of a shell of Acteon incisus

Scientific classification
- Kingdom: Animalia
- Phylum: Mollusca
- Class: Gastropoda
- Superfamily: Acteonoidea
- Family: Acteonidae
- Genus: Acteon
- Species: A. incisus

Binomial name
- Acteon incisus Dall, 1881

Synonyms
- Actaeon incisus Dall, 1881

= Acteon incisus =

Species of marine gastropod

Acteon incisus is a species of sea snail, a marine gastropod mollusc in the family Acteonidae.

== Description ==
The length of the shell attains 9 mm, its diameter 5.75 mm.

(Original description) The short, thin shell is inflated. It is waxen white and polished. It contains five or six whorls and a rather acute spire. The protoconch is minute, more or less immersedand eroded to some extent in every specimen. The apical whorls are smooth, polished and rounded. The suture is very distinct, in the majority of cases not channelled. The apical whorls show two or three distant narrow grooves across which, in some cases, pass elevated growth lines which appear nowhere else, or, if at all, only in the suture near the apex. The body whorl forms the largest part of the shell. It is inflated and provided with ten or eleven spiral grooves, which, are nearer together anteriorly. These grooves are somewhat zigzag by exigencies of growth, but are not punctate, as in so many species. The other spiral sculpture consists of microscopically fine slightly zigzag striae, about seventy in the width of a millimeter. The transverse sculpture consists only of most delicate flexuous lines of growth most evident near the sutures. The aperture is rounded in front and pointed behind. The outer lip is thin, simpleand arcuated toward the periphery, passing imperceptibly into the columella. The body of the shell has a slight callus joining the rather slender columella which carries one inconspicuous fold.

== Distribution ==
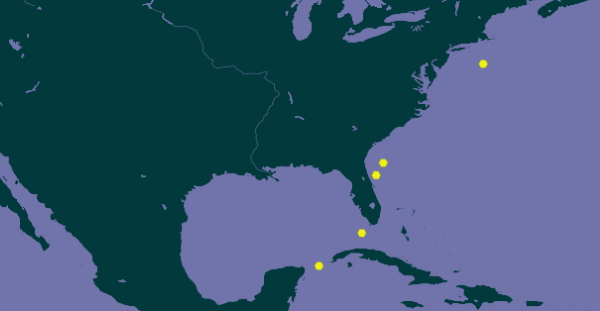
Distribution

This marine species occurs in the Western Atlantic Ocean off Georgia, USA; in the Caribbean Sea off Mexico and Saint Lucia.
