= Acteon graciliratus =

Scientific classification
- Kingdom: Animalia
- Phylum: Mollusca
- Class: Gastropoda
- Family: Acteonidae
- Genus: Acteon
- Species: †A. graciliratus

Binomial name
- †Acteon graciliratus Beets, 1942

Extinct species of gastropods

Acteon graciliratus is an extinct species of sea snail, a marine gastropod mollusc in the family Acteonidae.

== Distribution ==
Fossils of this marine species have been found in Upper Oligocene strata in Buton, Indonesia.
