= Acteon biplicatus =

Scientific classification
- Kingdom: Animalia
- Phylum: Mollusca
- Class: Gastropoda
- Superfamily: Acteonoidea
- Family: Acteonidae
- Genus: Acteon
- Species: †A. biplicatus

Binomial name
- †Acteon biplicatus (Melleville, 1843)

Synonyms
- † Tornatella biplicata Melleville, 1843 (original combination)

Extinct species of gastropods

Acteon biplicatus is an extinct species of sea snail, a marine gastropod mollusc in the family Acteonidae.

== Distribution ==
Fossils of this marine species have been found in Eocene strata in Champagne-Ardenne, France.
