= Acteon buccinus =

Scientific classification
- Kingdom: Animalia
- Phylum: Mollusca
- Class: Gastropoda
- Superfamily: Acteonoidea
- Family: Acteonidae
- Genus: Acteon
- Species: A. buccinus

Binomial name
- Acteon buccinus Á. Valdés, 2008

Species of marine gastropod

Acteon buccinus is a species of sea snail, a marine gastropod mollusc in the family Acteonidae.

== Description ==
The length of the shell attains 10 mm.

== Distribution ==
This marine species occurs in the Pacific Ocean, off New Caledonia at a depth of 385 m.
