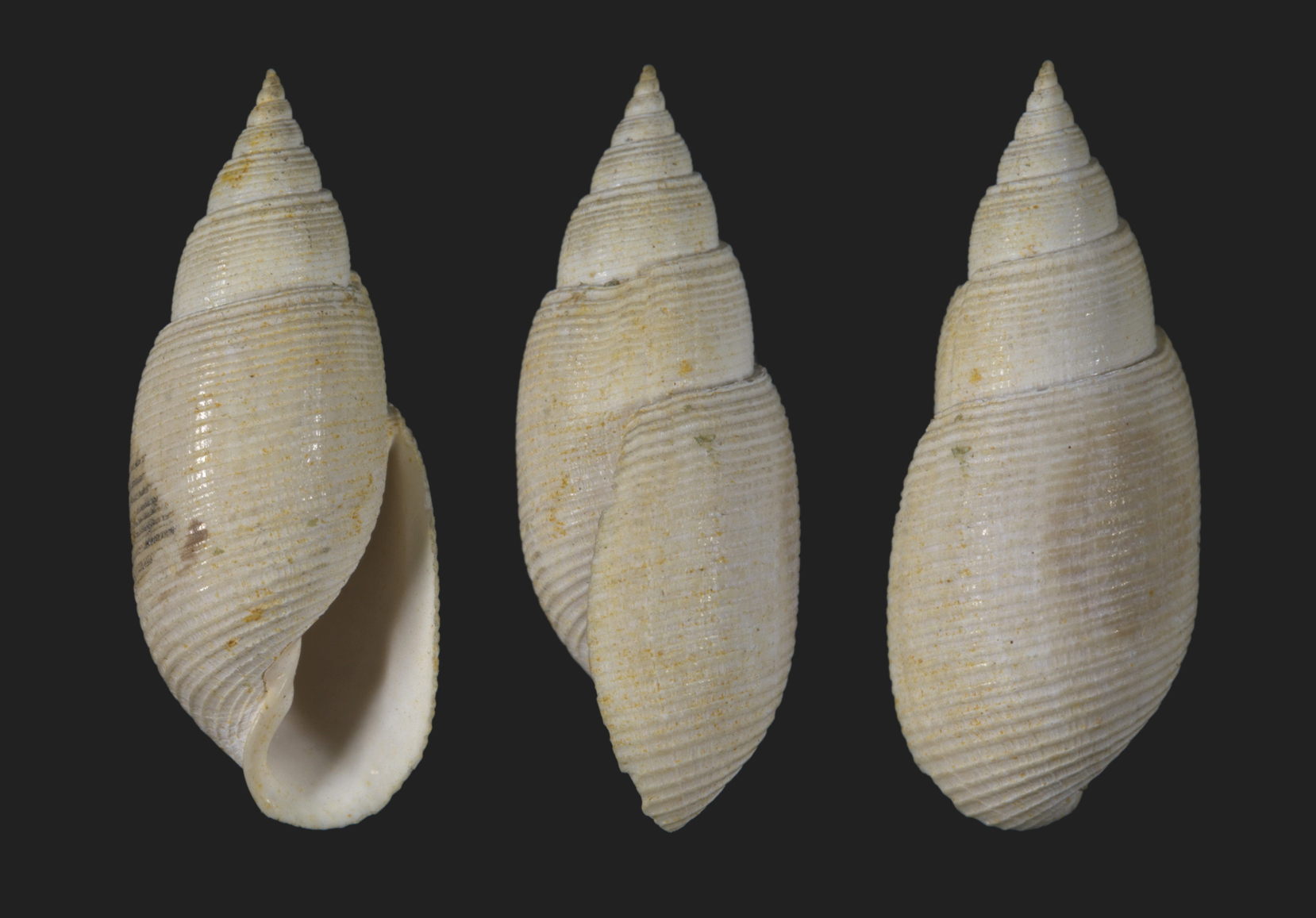
- Shell of Acteon gmelini (specimen at MNHN, Paris)

Scientific classification
- Kingdom: Animalia
- Phylum: Mollusca
- Class: Gastropoda
- Family: Acteonidae
- Genus: Acteon
- Species: †A. gmelini

Binomial name
- †Acteon gmelini (Bayan, 1870)

Synonyms
- † Actaeon gmelini Bayan, 1870 superseded combination

= Acteon gmelini =

Extinct species of gastropods

Acteon gmelini is an extinct species of sea snail, a marine gastropod mollusc in the family Acteonidae.

== Distribution ==
Fossils of this marine species have been found in Eocene strata in Île-de-France, France.
