= Acteon fasuloi =

Scientific classification
- Kingdom: Animalia
- Phylum: Mollusca
- Class: Gastropoda
- Superfamily: Acteonoidea
- Family: Acteonidae
- Genus: Acteon
- Species: A. fasuloi

Binomial name
- Acteon fasuloi Crocetta, Romani, Simone & Rolán, 2017

Synonyms
- Acteon elongatus Castellanos, Rolán & Bartolotta, 1987 (invalid: junior homonym of Acteon elongatus J. de C. Sowerby, 1824; A. fasuloi is a replacement name)

Species of marine gastropod

Acteon fasuloi is a species of sea snail, a marine gastropod mollusc in the family Acteonidae.

== Description ==
The length of the shell attains 8.5 mm, its diameter is 3.8 mm.

== Distribution ==
This marine species occurs off Argentina.
