= Acteon otamateaensis =

Scientific classification
- Kingdom: Animalia
- Phylum: Mollusca
- Class: Gastropoda
- Family: Acteonidae
- Genus: Acteon
- Species: †A. otamateaensis

Binomial name
- †Acteon otamateaensis Laws, 1941

Extinct species of gastropods

Acteon otamateaensis is an extinct species of sea snail, a marine gastropod mollusc in the family Acteonidae.

== Description ==
The length of the shell (spire missing) attains 4 mm, its diameter 2.4 mm.

== Distribution ==
Fossils of this marine species have been found in Tertiary strata in Kaipara, New Zealand.
