= Acteon morelletorum =

Scientific classification
- Kingdom: Animalia
- Phylum: Mollusca
- Class: Gastropoda
- Superfamily: Acteonoidea
- Family: Acteonidae
- Genus: Acteon
- Species: †A. morelletorum

Binomial name
- †Acteon morelletorum (Gougerot & Braillon, 1968)

Synonyms
- † Actaeon morelletorum Gougerot & Braillon, 1968 superseded combination

Extinct species of gastropods

Acteon morelletorum is an extinct species of sea snail, a marine gastropod mollusc in the family Acteonidae.

== Distribution ==
Fossils of this marine species have been found in Eocene strata in Île-de-France, France.
