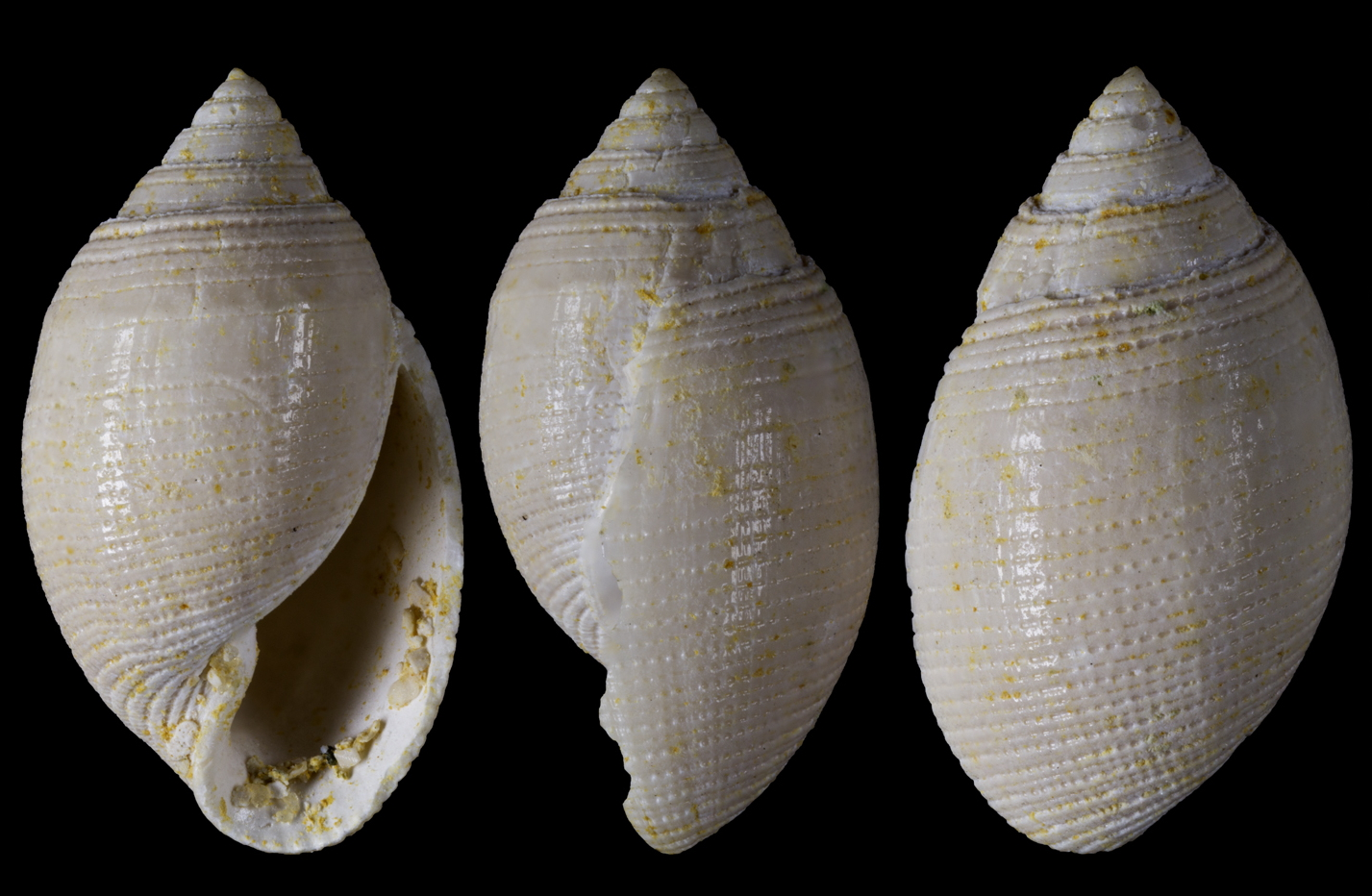
- Shell of † Acteon deshayesi (specimen at MNHN, Paris)

Scientific classification
- Kingdom: Animalia
- Phylum: Mollusca
- Class: Gastropoda
- Superfamily: Acteonoidea
- Family: Acteonidae
- Genus: Acteon
- Species: †A. deshayesi

Binomial name
- †Acteon deshayesi (de Raincourt & Munier-Chalmas, 1863)

Synonyms
- † Actaeon deshayesi de Raincourt & Munier-Chalmas, 1863; † Tornatella deshayesi de Raincourt & Munier-Chalmas, 1863 superseded combination

= Acteon deshayesi =

Extinct species of gastropods

Acteon deshayesi is an extinct species of sea snail, a marine gastropod mollusc in the family Acteonidae.

== Distribution ==
Fossils of this marine species have been found in Eocene strata in Île-de-France, France.
