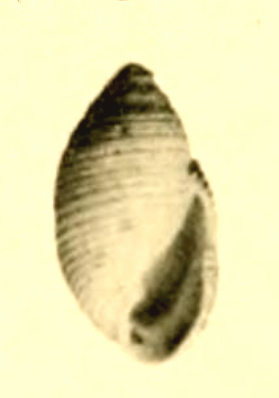
- Shell of Acteon houdasi (holotype)

Scientific classification
- Kingdom: Animalia
- Phylum: Mollusca
- Class: Gastropoda
- Family: Acteonidae
- Genus: Acteon
- Species: †A. houdasi

Binomial name
- †Acteon houdasi (Cossmann, 1907)

Synonyms
- † Actaeon houdasi Cossmann, 1907 superseded combination

= Acteon houdasi =

Extinct species of gastropods

Acteon houdasi is an extinct species of sea snail, a marine gastropod mollusc in the family Acteonidae.

== Distribution ==
Fossils of this marine species have been found in Eocene strata in Picardy, France.
