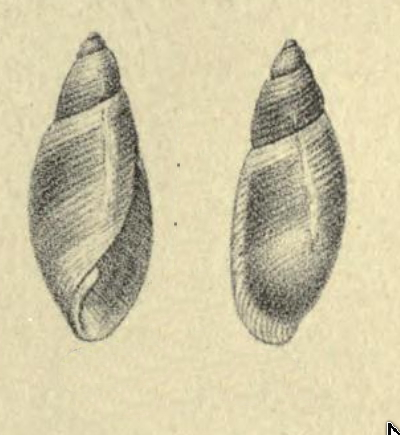
- Drawing of a shell of Acteon venustus

Scientific classification
- Kingdom: Animalia
- Phylum: Mollusca
- Class: Gastropoda
- Superfamily: Acteonoidea
- Family: Acteonidae
- Genus: Acteon
- Species: A. venustus

Binomial name
- Acteon venustus (d'Orbigny, 1840)
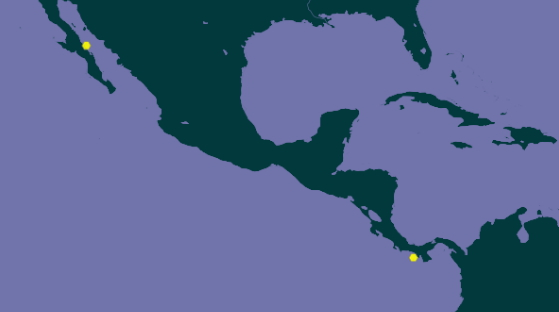

Synonyms
- Tornatella venusta d'Orbigny, 1840 (original combination)

= Acteon venustus =

Species of gastropod

Acteon venustus is a species of sea snail, a marine gastropod mollusk in the family Acteonidae.

== Description ==
The length of the shell attains 10 mm, its diameter 3.5 mm.

The thin, elongated-cylindrical shell is roseate. It is transversely striated. The spire is elongated. The apex is obtuse. The shell contains five whorls, the body whorl is large. The aperture is narrow and long. The columella shows one projecting fold.

== Distribution ==
This species occurs in the Pacific Ocean off Mexico, Panama and Peru.
