= Acteon dudariensis =

Scientific classification
- Kingdom: Animalia
- Phylum: Mollusca
- Class: Gastropoda
- Superfamily: Acteonoidea
- Family: Acteonidae
- Genus: Acteon
- Species: †A. dudariensis

Binomial name
- †Acteon dudariensis Strausz, 1966

Extinct species of gastropods

Acteon dudariensis is an extinct species of sea snail, a marine gastropod mollusc in the family Acteonidae.

== Distribution ==
Fossils of this marine species have been found in Eocene strata in Hungary
