= Acteon surensis =

Scientific classification
- Kingdom: Animalia
- Phylum: Mollusca
- Class: Gastropoda
- Family: Acteonidae
- Genus: Acteon
- Species: †A. surensis

Binomial name
- †Acteon surensis Gerasimov, 1992

Extinct species of gastropods

Acteon surensis is an extinct species of sea snail, a marine gastropod mollusc in the family Acteonidae.

== Distribution ==
Fossils of this marine species have been found in strata of the Middle Jurassic (Callovian stage) in Nizhniy Novgorod Region, Sechenov District, the left bank of the Sura River near Murzitsy settlement, Russia.
