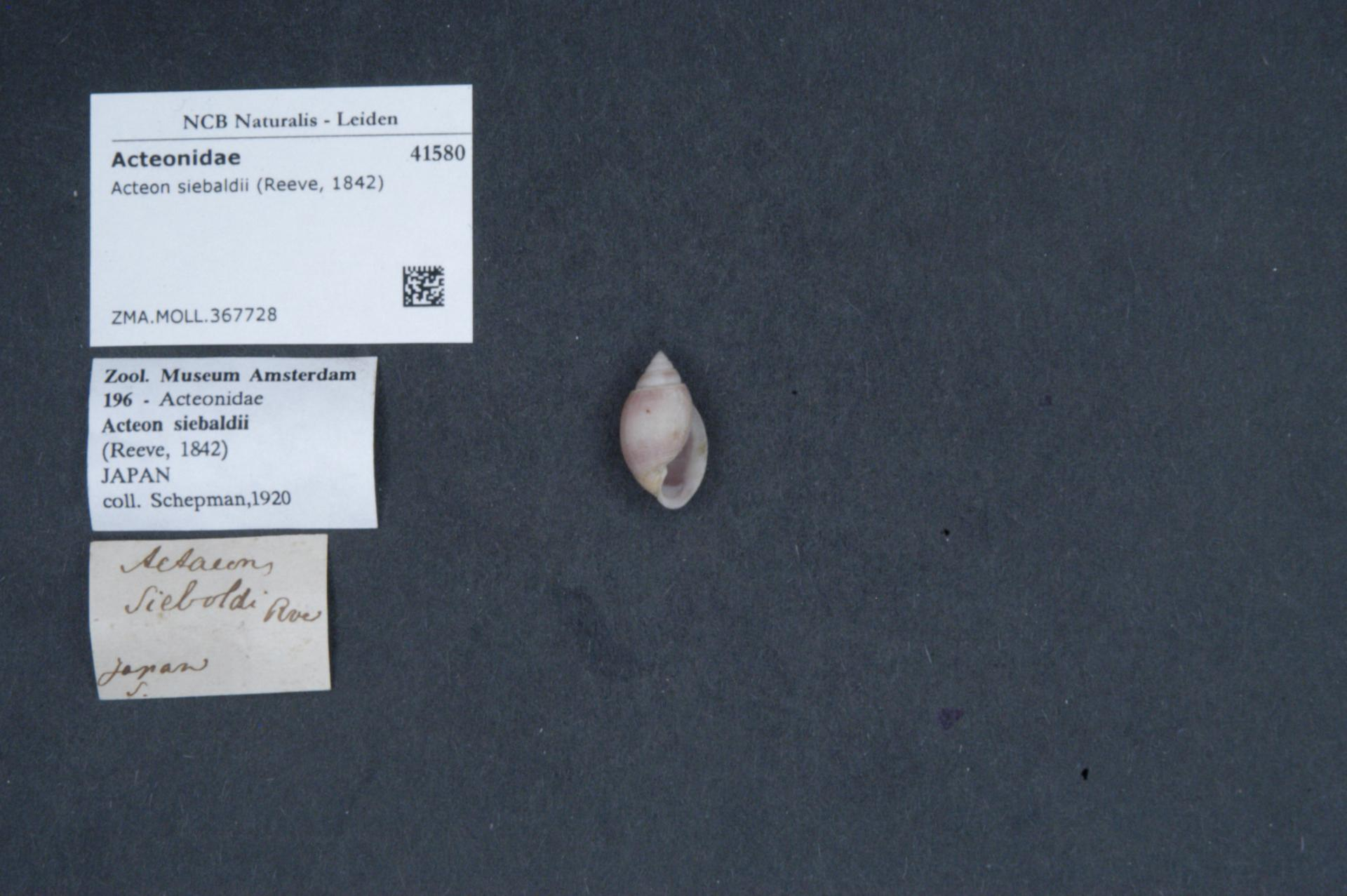
- Shell of Acteon sieboldii (specimen at Naturalis Biodiversity Center)

Scientific classification
- Kingdom: Animalia
- Phylum: Mollusca
- Class: Gastropoda
- Superfamily: Acteonoidea
- Family: Acteonidae
- Genus: Acteon
- Species: A. sieboldii

Binomial name
- Acteon sieboldii (Reeve, 1842)

Synonyms
- Japonactaeon sieboldii (Reeve, 1842) superseded combination; Tornatella sieboldii Reeve, 1842 ·

= Acteon sieboldii =

Species of marine gastropod

Acteon sieboldii is a species of sea snail, a marine gastropod mollusc in the family Acteonidae.

== Description ==
The shell is ovately conical. It is transversely densely striated throughout. It has a livid ruddy color and is banded with white at the sutures. The columella is one-plaited

== Distribution ==
This marine species occurs off Japan, Oman and the Philippines.
