= Acteon modestus =

Scientific classification
- Kingdom: Animalia
- Phylum: Mollusca
- Class: Gastropoda
- Superfamily: Acteonoidea
- Family: Acteonidae
- Genus: Acteon
- Species: A. modestus

Binomial name
- Acteon modestus Thiele, 1925

Synonyms
- Actaeon modestus Thiele, 1925 (incorrect spelling of genus name)

Species of marine gastropod

Acteon modestus is a species of sea snail, a marine gastropod mollusc in the family Acteonidae.

== Status ==
This name is temporarily accepted as an unreplaced junior homonym (invalid: based on junior primary homonym of Actaeon modestus A. Adams 1855; no replacement name has yet been proposed.)

== Distribution ==
This marine species occurs off western Sumatra, Indonesia.
