= Acteon aphyodes =

Scientific classification
- Kingdom: Animalia
- Phylum: Mollusca
- Class: Gastropoda
- Superfamily: Acteonoidea
- Family: Acteonidae
- Genus: Acteon
- Species: A. aphyodes

Binomial name
- Acteon aphyodes Á. Valdés, 2008

Species of marine gastropod

Acteon aphyodes is a species of sea snail, a marine gastropod mollusc in the family Acteonidae.

The shell is convoluted, ovate, cylindrical, generally transversely striated. The aperture is oblong, entire, somewhat effuse at its base. It shows one or more folds upon the columella. The outer lip is thin, sharp, never having a varix.

The species of this genus are all marine, and convolute. They are almost always transversely striated. They are generally oval and cylindrical. The spire is more or less projecting and obtuse. The aperture is elongated, often narrowed at its posterior part, widened and somewhat effuse at its base. The folds of the columella vary from one to three. They are generally thick and obtuse.

In the genus Acteon, the individual teeth of the radula are very small. There are many teeth in each row.

== Description ==
The length of the shell attains 15 mm.

== Distribution ==
This marine species occurs in the tropical southwest Pacific Ocean, close to Fiji at depths between 767 m and 1,000 m.
