= Acteon novellus =

Scientific classification
- Kingdom: Animalia
- Phylum: Mollusca
- Class: Gastropoda
- Family: Acteonidae
- Genus: Acteon
- Species: †A. novellus

Binomial name
- †Acteon novellus Conrad, 1834

Extinct species of gastropods

Acteon novellus is an extinct species of sea snail, a marine gastropod mollusc in the family Acteonidae.

== Distribution ==
Fossils of this marine species have been found in Tertiary strata in Virginia, USA..
