= Acteon laetus =

Scientific classification
- Kingdom: Animalia
- Phylum: Mollusca
- Class: Gastropoda
- Superfamily: Acteonoidea
- Family: Acteonidae
- Genus: Acteon
- Species: A. laetus

Binomial name
- Acteon laetus Thiele, 1925

Synonyms
- Actaeon laetus Thiele, 1925 (incorrect spelling of genus name)

Species of marine gastropod

Acteon laetus is a species of sea snail, a marine gastropod mollusc in the family Acteonidae.

== Status ==
The name of this species is temporarily accepted as an unreplaced junior homonym (secondary junior homonym of Acteon laetus (Deshayes, 1862) )

== Distribution ==
This marine species occurs in the Zanzibar Channel; also off New Caledonia and Wallis and Futuna.
