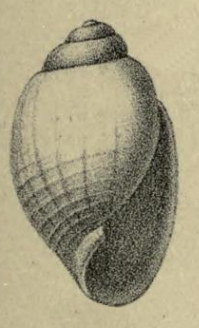
- Shell of Acteon semisculptus

Scientific classification
- Kingdom: Animalia
- Phylum: Mollusca
- Class: Gastropoda
- Superfamily: Acteonoidea
- Family: Acteonidae
- Genus: Acteon
- Species: A. semisculptus

Binomial name
- Acteon semisculptus E. A. Smith, 1890

Synonyms
- Actaeon semisculptus E. A. Smith, 1890 (incorrect spelling of genus name)

= Acteon semisculptus =

Species of marine gastropod

Acteon semisculptus is a species of sea snail, a marine gastropod mollusc in the family Acteonidae.

== Description ==
The length of the shell attains 4 mm, its diameter 2.25 mm.

The small, ovate shell is turrited. It is snow-white and shining. It is very narrowly rimate. The shell is smooth above, rather distantly punctostriate transversely below the middle and on the base more closely striated. It is sculptured longitudinally with a few indistinct, distant sulci. The shell contains four whorls, lightly convex, separated by a narrow channelled suture. The apex is involute. The aperture is inversely ear-shaped and measures a little more than half the shell's length. The columella is narrowly reflexed, bearing a small fold at the rimation.

== Distribution ==
This marine species occurs in the Atlantic Ocean off Saint Helena.
