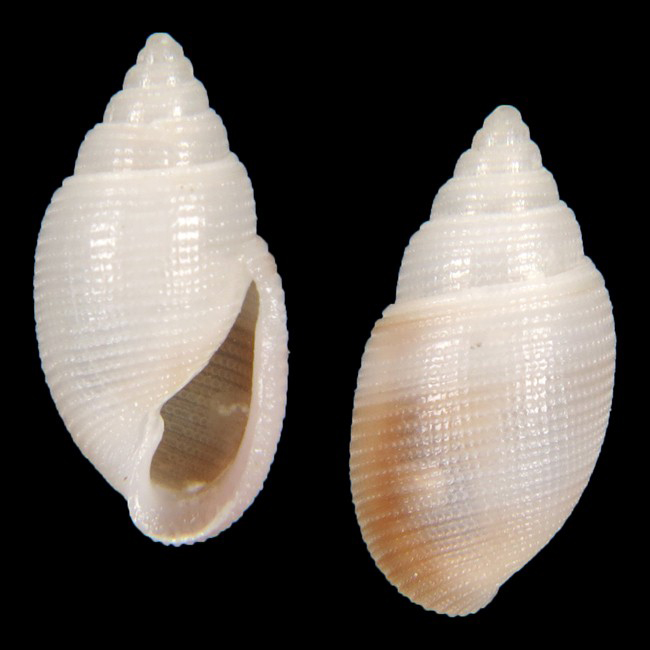

Scientific classification
- Kingdom: Animalia
- Phylum: Mollusca
- Class: Gastropoda
- Family: Acteonidae
- Genus: Acteon
- Species: A. valentina

Binomial name
- Acteon valentina Poppe, Tagaro & Stahlschmidt, 2015

= Acteon valentina =

Species of gastropod

Acteon valentina is a species of sea snail, a marine gastropod mollusk in the family Acteonidae.

== Original description ==
- Poppe G.T., Tagaro S.P. & Stahlschmidt P. (2015). New shelled molluscan species from the central Philippines I. Visaya. 4(3): 15-59. page(s): 33, pl. 13 figs 3-4.
