= Acteon comptus =

Scientific classification
- Kingdom: Animalia
- Phylum: Mollusca
- Class: Gastropoda
- Superfamily: Acteonoidea
- Family: Acteonidae
- Genus: Acteon
- Species: A. comptus

Binomial name
- Acteon comptus Á. Valdés, 2008

Species of marine gastropod

Acteon comptus is a species of sea snail, a marine gastropod mollusc in the family Acteonidae.

== Description ==
The length of the shell attains 7 mm.

== Distribution ==
This marine species occurs in the Pacific Ocean, off New Caledonia at depths between 210 m and 2,377 m.
