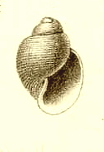
- Shell of Acteon antarcticus (holotype)

Scientific classification
- Kingdom: Animalia
- Phylum: Mollusca
- Class: Gastropoda
- Superfamily: Acteonoidea
- Family: Acteonidae
- Genus: Acteon
- Species: A. antarcticus

Binomial name
- Acteon antarcticus Thiele, 1912

Synonyms
- Actaeon antarcticus Thiele, 1912 superseded combination

= Acteon antarcticus =

Species of marine gastropod

Acteon antarcticus is a species of sea snail, a marine gastropod mollusc in the family Acteonidae.

== Description ==
The shell of Acteon antarcticus is smooth, cylindrical, and oval in shape, with a maximum length of 6.6 mm. It is characterised by fine transverse lines and a long, smooth aperture that tapers slightly at the base. The central region of the shell exhibits distinct folds, while the outer lip is thin and sharp, lacking any thickened margins.

== Distribution ==
Acteon antarcticus is a marine gastropod species found in subantarctic waters, primarily in the Southern Ocean. Its known range includes regions surrounding the subantarctic islands and continental shelf areas near Antarctica. The species inhabits benthic zones at depths ranging from 120 to 340 meters, often occurring in cold, nutrient-rich waters with soft sediment substrates.
