= Acteon loyautensis =

Scientific classification
- Kingdom: Animalia
- Phylum: Mollusca
- Class: Gastropoda
- Superfamily: Acteonoidea
- Family: Acteonidae
- Genus: Acteon
- Species: A. loyautensis

Binomial name
- Acteon loyautensis Á. Valdés, 2008

Species of marine gastropod

Acteon loyautensis is a species of sea snail, a marine gastropod mollusc in the family Acteonidae.

== Description ==
The length of the shell attains 9 mm.

== Distribution ==
This marine species occurs off New Caledonia at the Norfolk Ridge at a depth of 965 m.
