= Acteon profundus =

Scientific classification
- Kingdom: Animalia
- Phylum: Mollusca
- Class: Gastropoda
- Superfamily: Acteonoidea
- Family: Acteonidae
- Genus: Acteon
- Species: A. profundus

Binomial name
- Acteon profundus Á. Valdés, 2008

Species of marine gastropod

Acteon profundus is a species of sea snail, a marine gastropod mollusc in the family Acteonidae.

== Taxonomy ==
Taxonomists first encountered this species in 2008 when Dr. Ángel Valdés bestowed upon it the binomial name Acteon profundus. Its classification places it within the family Acteonidae, a group of marine snails known for their intricate shells.

== Description ==
Acteon profundus are found in the tropical southwest Pacific.

== Ross Sea ==
Dr. Ángel Valdés' research on Antarctic molluscs emphasized the fauna of the Ross Sea.
