= Acteon juvenis =

Scientific classification
- Kingdom: Animalia
- Phylum: Mollusca
- Class: Gastropoda
- Family: Acteonidae
- Genus: Acteon
- Species: A. juvenis

Binomial name
- Acteon juvenis Dall, 1927
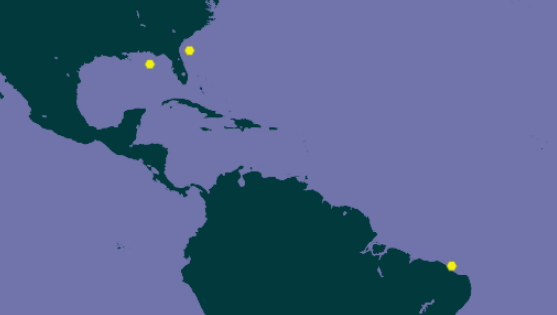

Species of marine gastropod

Acteon juvenis is a species of sea snail, a marine gastropod mollusc in the family Acteonidae.

== Description ==
The length of the shell attains 3 mm, its diameter 2 mm.

(Original description) The minute, white shell has a bluntly immersed protoconch and four moderately convex whorls. The suture is channelled with the whorl in front of it minutely narrowly tabulate. The sculpture consists of (on the body whorl about a dozen) spiral conspicuously punctuate uniform grooves, covering the whorl. The base of the shell is imperforate. The columella shows a feeble obscure plait lagging behind the aperture. The outer lip is thin. The aperture is narrowly ovate.

== Distribution ==
This marine species occurs in the Atlantic Ocean off Georgia, USA and Brazil.
