= Acteon marullensis =

Scientific classification
- Kingdom: Animalia
- Phylum: Mollusca
- Class: Gastropoda
- Superfamily: Acteonoidea
- Family: Acteonidae
- Genus: Acteon
- Species: †A. marullensis

Binomial name
- †Acteon marullensis A. d'Orbigny, 1850

Synonyms
- † Tornatellaea sp. Kollmann, 2005

Extinct species of gastropods

Acteon marullensis is an extinct species of sea snail, a marine gastropod mollusc in the family Acteonidae.

== Distribution ==
Fossils of this marine species have been found in Lower Cretaceous strata in Champagne-Ardenne, France.
