= Acteon subtornatilis =

Scientific classification
- Kingdom: Animalia
- Phylum: Mollusca
- Class: Gastropoda
- Superfamily: Acteonoidea
- Family: Acteonidae
- Genus: Acteon
- Species: †A. subtornatilis

Binomial name
- †Acteon subtornatilis Pilsbry & C. W. Johnson, 1917

Extinct species of gastropods

Acteon subtornatilis is an extinct species of sea snail, a marine gastropod mollusc in the family Acteonidae.

== Description ==
The length of the shell attains 17 mm, its diameter 8.4 mm.

(Original description) The shell is similar to Acteon tornatilis (Linnaeus, 1758) of Europe in size and form, but as coarsely sculptured over the whole body whorl as that species is on the base. There are about 35 subequal spiral grooves on the body whorl, cut into square or oblong pits by narrow vertical lamellae, the grooves separated by flat-topped ridges which are wider than the intervals except on the base, where they become narrow, no longer flat-topped, and about equal in width to the intervening grooves.

== Distribution ==
Fossils of this marine species have been found in Oligocene strata in the Dominican Republic.
