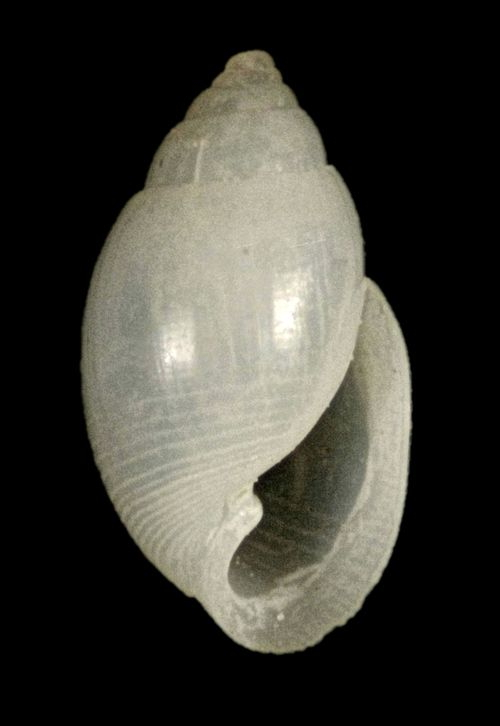
- Shell of Acteon splendidulus (specimen at Naturalis Biodiversity Center)

Scientific classification
- Kingdom: Animalia
- Phylum: Mollusca
- Class: Gastropoda
- Superfamily: Acteonoidea
- Family: Acteonidae
- Genus: Acteon
- Species: A. splendidulus

Binomial name
- Acteon splendidulus Mörch, 1875
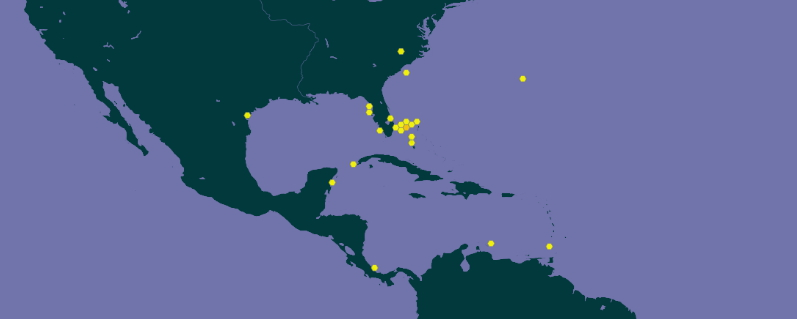

= Acteon splendidulus =

Species of marine gastropod

Acteon splendidulus is a species of sea snail, a marine gastropod mollusc in the family Acteonidae.

== Description ==
The length of the shell attains 5 mm, its diameter 2.25 mm.

The elongate-ovate shell is very solid. It is whitish, bright and shining. It contains about five whorls, the body whorl impressed with spiral lines, punctate along their bottoms, very distant in the middle of the body whorl, but toward the base becoming closer and in pairs. The sutural region is smooth. The spire is elevated, with two punctate lines. The columellar fold is oblique, but little projecting. The outer lip is thick.

== Distribution ==
This marine species occurs in the Caribbean Sea off Panama Curaçao, the Virgin Islands and Suriname; in the Atlantic Ocean off the Bahamas
