= Acteon fragilis =

Scientific classification
- Kingdom: Animalia
- Phylum: Mollusca
- Class: Gastropoda
- Superfamily: Acteonoidea
- Family: Acteonidae
- Genus: Acteon
- Species: A. fragilis

Binomial name
- Acteon fragilis Thiele, 1925

Synonyms
- Actaeon fragilis Thiele, 1925 (incorrect spelling of genus name)

Species of marine gastropod

Acteon fragilis is a species of sea snail, a marine gastropod mollusc in the family Acteonidae.

== Distribution ==
This marine species occurs in the Atlantic Ocean off Namibia.
