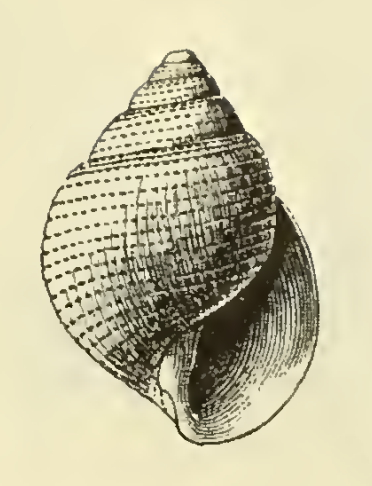
- Drawing of a shell of Acteon perforatus

Scientific classification
- Kingdom: Animalia
- Phylum: Mollusca
- Class: Gastropoda
- Superfamily: Acteonoidea
- Family: Acteonidae
- Genus: Acteon
- Species: A. perforatus

Binomial name
- Acteon perforatus Dall, 1881

Synonyms
- Actaeon perforatus Dall, 1881

= Acteon perforatus =

Species of marine gastropod

Acteon perforatus is a species of sea snail, a marine gastropod mollusc in the family Acteonidae.

== Description ==
The length of the shell attains 7.75 mm, its diameter 4.62 mm.

(Original description) The small, pointed shell is waxen white, with a narrow opaque yellowish band in advance of the suture. The shell is composed of about six whorls and has a distinct umbilical perforation. The small protoconch is eroded. The spire shows about six, or (on the body whorl) eighteen strong and very regularly and distinctly punctate grooves, the punctations at the rate (near the aperture) of about six to a millimeter, the grooves a little more crowded anteriorly and distant posteriorly, the interspaces everywhere wider than the grooves and with no intercalary grooves or striae whatever. The transverse sculpture consists of faint lines of growth. The aperture is rounded in front and pointed behind. The outer lip is thin, simple, arched, and continuous with the reflected thin columellar lip, upon which a fold can hardly be made out. The body of the shell shows a slight glaze. The umbilical perforation is straight, with smooth walls, apparently very deep, and about 0.25 mm. in diameter.

== Distribution ==
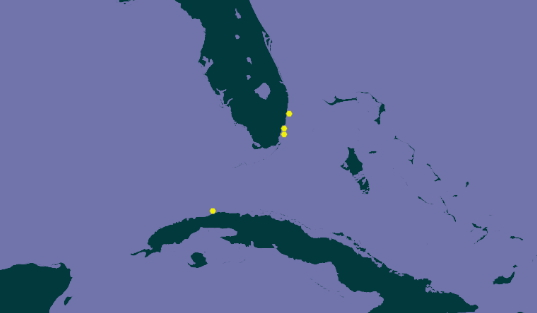
Distribution

This marine species occurs in the Caribbean Sea off Florida, Mexico, Cuba and Saint Lucia.
