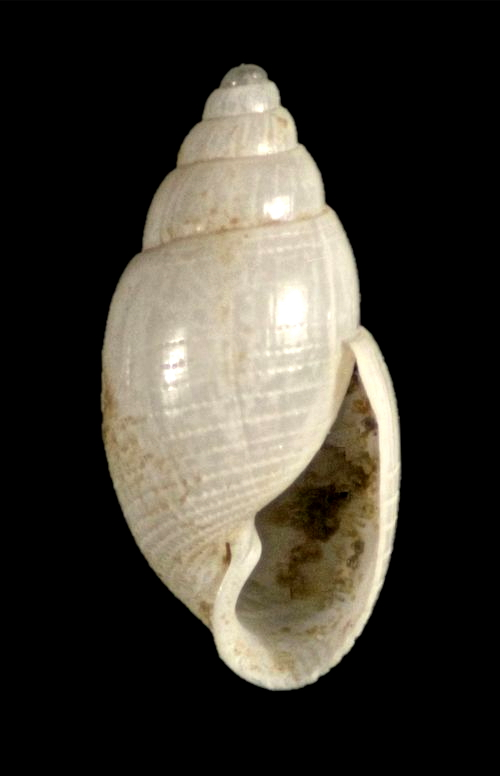
- Shell of Acteon exiguus (specimen at Naturalis Biodiversity Center)

Scientific classification
- Kingdom: Animalia
- Phylum: Mollusca
- Class: Gastropoda
- Superfamily: Acteonoidea
- Family: Acteonidae
- Genus: Acteon
- Species: A. exiguus

Binomial name
- Acteon exiguus Mörch, 1875

= Acteon exiguus =

Species of marine gastropod

Acteon exiguus is a species of sea snail, a marine gastropod mollusc in the family Acteonidae.

== Description ==
The length of the shell attains 7 mm.

The shell is covered-perforate, flesh colored and ovate. The spire is elevated, nearly half the length of the shell The body whorl covers its lower half. The shell is sulcate, the bottoms of the grooves punctate. The spire and the upper half of the body whorl are smooth. The suture is subcontabulate, margined by an impressed line. The columellar fold is strong.

The single line below the suture is characteristic for this species.

== Distribution ==
This marine species occurs in the Caribbean Sea off Haiti, Venezuela, Virgin Islands, Grenada and Suriname.
