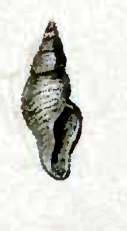
- Image of a shell of Acteon castus

Scientific classification
- Kingdom: Animalia
- Phylum: Mollusca
- Class: Gastropoda
- Superfamily: Acteonoidea
- Family: Acteonidae
- Genus: Acteon
- Species: A. castus

Binomial name
- Acteon castus Hinds, 1844

Synonyms
- Daphnella casta Hinds, 1844 (original combination)

= Acteon castus =

Species of gastropod

Acteon castus is a species of sea snail, a marine gastropod mollusc in the family Acteonidae.

== Description ==
The length of the shell is up to 13.5 mm.

The glassy shell is spirally grooved. The columella is twisted. The color is faintly tinged with pink.

== Distribution ==
This marine species occurs in the Pacific Ocean off Costa Rica.
