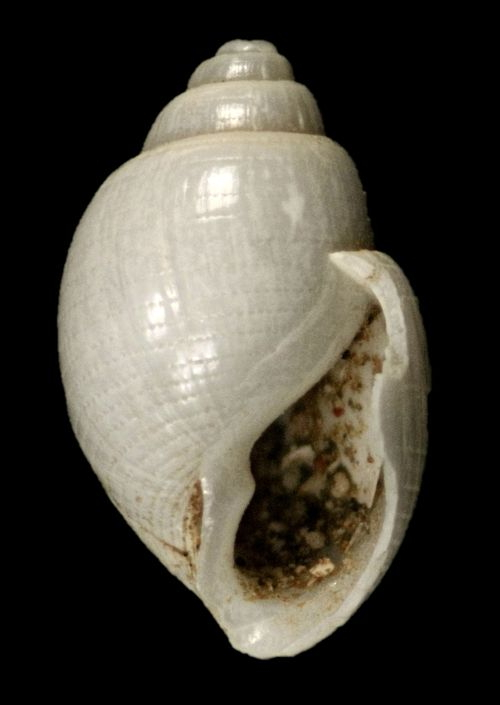
- Shell of Rapturella globulina (specimen at Naturalis Biodiversity Center)

Scientific classification
- Kingdom: Animalia
- Phylum: Mollusca
- Class: Gastropoda
- Superfamily: Acteonoidea
- Family: Acteonidae
- Genus: Rapturella
- Species: R. globulina

Binomial name
- Rapturella globulina (Forbes, 1844)

Synonyms
- Liocarenus globulinus (Forbes, 1844); Tornatella globulina Forbes, 1844 (original combination)

= Rapturella globulina =

Species of marine gastropod

Rapturella globulina is a species of sea snail, a marine gastropod mollusc in the family Acteonidae.

== Description ==
The length of the shell varies between 3 mm and 18 mm.

The white shell is globose. The spire is short. The shell contains four whorls, spirally striated, the striae are numerous and simple. The aperture is pyriform. The columella is thickened.

== Distribution ==
This marine species occurs in the Atlantic Ocean off Brazil, the Azores and Cape Verde; in the Mediterranean Sea off Italy and Greece.
