= Acteon areatus =

Scientific classification
- Kingdom: Animalia
- Phylum: Mollusca
- Class: Gastropoda
- Superfamily: Acteonoidea
- Family: Acteonidae
- Genus: Acteon
- Species: A. areatus

Binomial name
- Acteon areatus Verco, 1907

Synonyms
- Acteon roseus var. areatus Verco, 1907 (superseded combination)

Species of marine gastropod

Acteon areatus is a species of sea snail, a marine gastropod mollusc in the family Acteonidae.

== Description ==
(Original description) This small species differs from Acteon roseus by a shorter spire and a longer aperture. It also shows two white spiral bands and several undulating axial bands, which break the colour up into oblong blotches.

== Distribution ==
This marine species occurs off South Australia.
