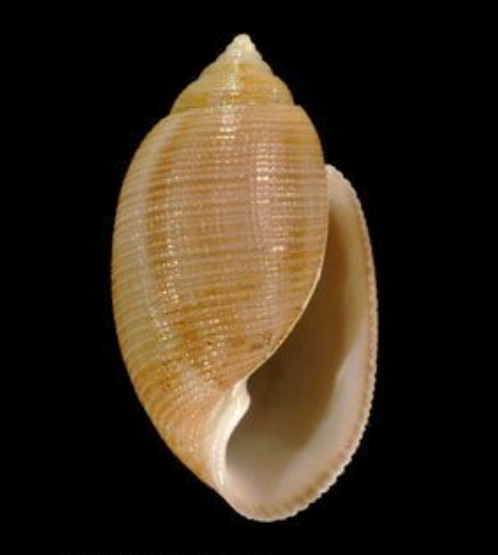
- Shell of Mysouffa cumingii (specimen at the Natural History Museum, Rotterdam)

Scientific classification
- Kingdom: Animalia
- Phylum: Mollusca
- Class: Gastropoda
- Superfamily: Acteonoidea
- Family: Acteonidae
- Genus: Mysouffa
- Species: M. cumingii

Binomial name
- Mysouffa cumingii (A. Adams, 1855)

Synonyms
- Actaeon cumingii A. Adams, 1855 (original combination); Acteon cumingii A. Adams, 1855 (original combination)

= Mysouffa cumingii =

Species of gastropod

Mysouffa cumingii is a species of sea snail, a marine gastropod mollusk in the family Acteonidae.

== Description ==
(Described as Actaeon cumingii) The oval shell is subcylindrical. it is flesh colored. The spire is exserted. The convex whorls are transversely sulcate, the sulci beautifully cancellated, longitudinally striated. The columella shows a single fold below. The aperture is white inside. The outer lip is acute and subsinuous above.

This differs from Acteon delicatus by its stumpier form, coarser and ruder subcancellate striation, more prominent fold on the columella and particularly by its protoconch which, though small, is swollen and set on the peek of a very acute spire like a swollen terminal bud on a twig. In A. delicatus the protoconch, instead of appearing larger, is considerably smaller than the whorl in front of it, in which it is also partially immersed.

== Distribution ==
This marine species occurs in the Atlantic Ocean off Brazil; in the Caribbean Sea off Panama, Guadeloupe, the Virgin Islands, Antigua and Barbuda.
