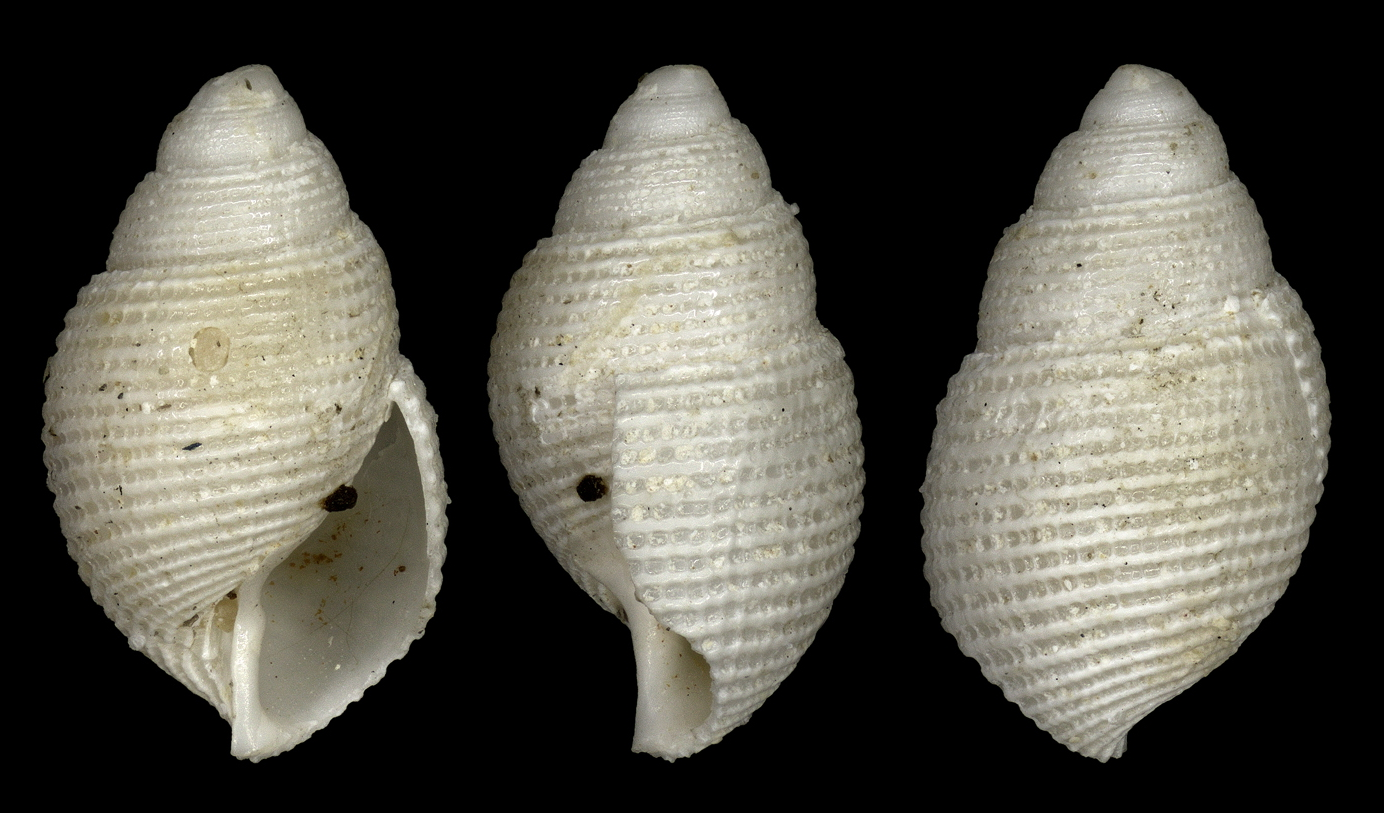
- Shell of † Acteon sphaericulus (specimen at MNHN, Paris)

Scientific classification
- Kingdom: Animalia
- Phylum: Mollusca
- Class: Gastropoda
- Superfamily: Acteonoidea
- Family: Acteonidae
- Genus: Acteon
- Species: †A. sphaericulus

Binomial name
- †Acteon sphaericulus (Deshayes, 1862)

Synonyms
- † Acteon (Semiactaeon) sphaericulus (Deshayes, 1862) superseded combination; † Tornatella sphaericula Deshayes, 1862 superseded combination

= Acteon sphaericulus =

Extinct species of gastropods

Acteon sphaericulus is an extinct species of sea snail, a marine gastropod mollusc in the family Acteonidae.

== Distribution ==
Fossils of this marine species have been found in Eocene strata in Picardy, France.
