= Acteon loustaui =

Scientific classification
- Kingdom: Animalia
- Phylum: Mollusca
- Class: Gastropoda
- Superfamily: Acteonoidea
- Family: Acteonidae
- Genus: Acteon
- Species: †A. loustaui

Binomial name
- †Acteon loustaui (Deshayes, 1861)

Synonyms
- † Tornatella loustaui Deshayes, 1861 superseded combination

Extinct species of gastropods

Acteon loustaui is an extinct species of sea snail, a marine gastropod mollusc in the family Acteonidae.

== Distribution ==
Fossils of this marine species have been found in Paleogene strata in the Paris Basin, France.
