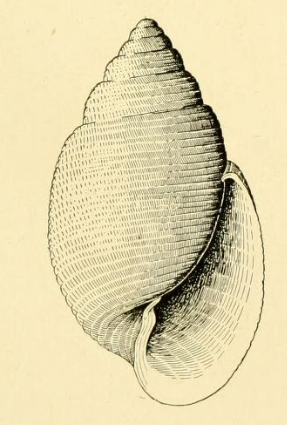
- Shell of Acteon roseus (holotype)

Scientific classification
- Kingdom: Animalia
- Phylum: Mollusca
- Class: Gastropoda
- Superfamily: Acteonoidea
- Family: Acteonidae
- Genus: Acteon
- Species: A. roseus

Binomial name
- Acteon roseus Hedley, 1906

Synonyms
- Actaeon roseus Hedley, 1906 (superseded combination)

= Acteon roseus =

Species of marine gastropod

Acteon roseus is a species of sea snail, a marine gastropod mollusc in the family Acteonidae.

== Variety ==
- Acteon roseus var. areatus Verco, 1907: synonym of Acteon areatus Verco, 1907 (superseded combination)

== Description ==
The length of the shell attains 15 mm, its diameter 8 mm.

(Original description) The large shel lis ovate-acuminate, rather thin and with an acute spire. The shell contains seven round-shouldered whorls, parted by channelled sutures. The surface is smooth and glossy. The colour of the shell is a pale flesh-pink, darkest behind the aperture, interrupted by a broad white peripheral band.

Sculpture: narrow, shallow punctate grooves numbering about thirty on the body whorl, and on the two previous six each, crowded at the base and wider spaced towards the suture, separate smooth flat-topped narrow spiral riblets. The base of the shell is perforate excavate around the umbilicus. The aperture measures half the total length of the shell and is rounded below. The columella is broad with a reflected margin. Its plication is not prominent. The inner lip spreads a sheet of callus on the base of the previous whorl.

== Distribution ==
This marine species is endemic to Australia and occurs off New South Wales.
