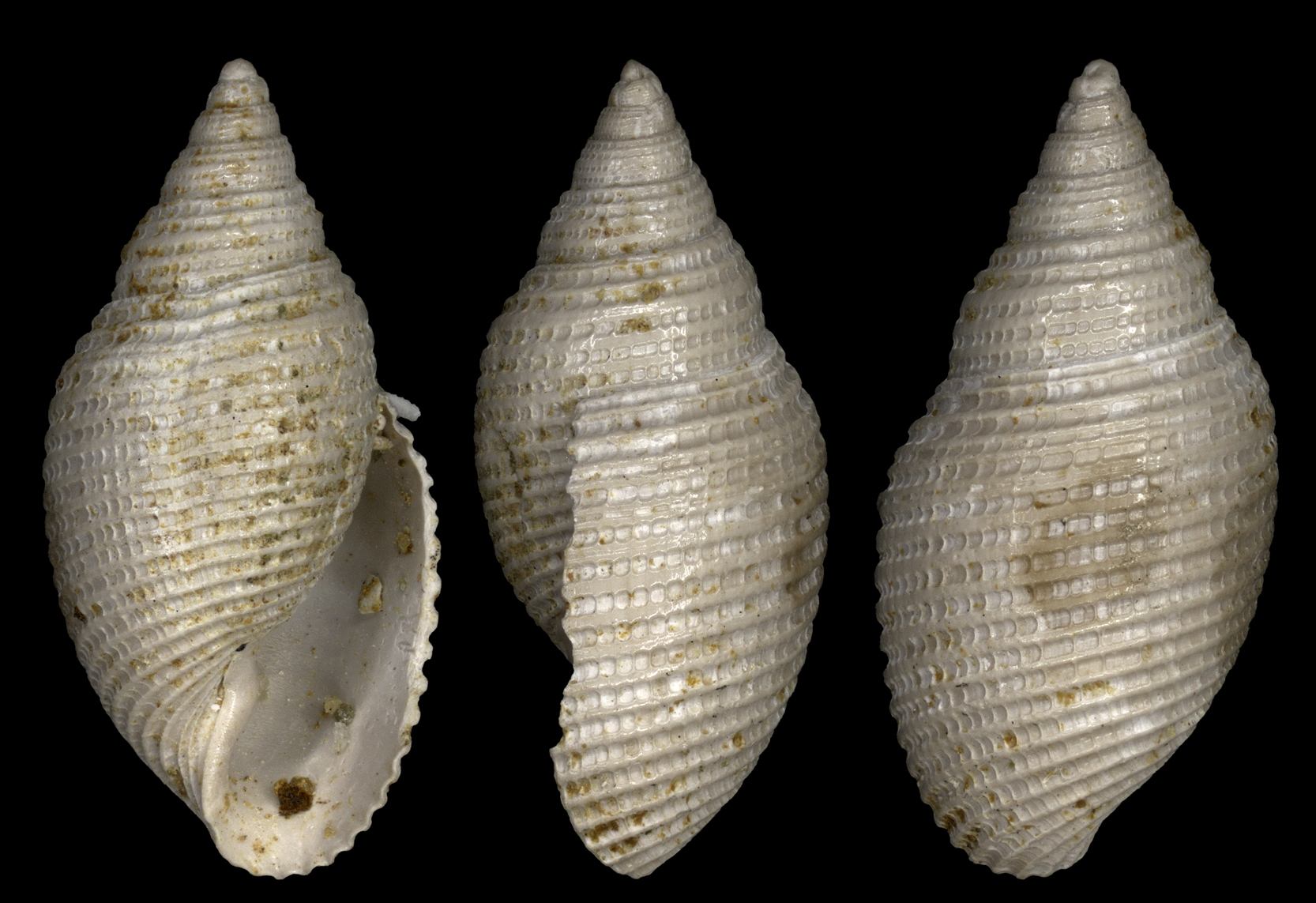
- Shell of † Acteon aizyensis (specimen at MNHN, Paris)

Scientific classification
- Kingdom: Animalia
- Phylum: Mollusca
- Class: Gastropoda
- Superfamily: Acteonoidea
- Family: Acteonidae
- Genus: Acteon
- Species: †A. aizyensis

Binomial name
- †Acteon aizyensis (Deshayes, 1862)

Synonyms
- † Tornatella aizyensis Deshayes, 1862 superseded combination

= Acteon aizyensis =

Extinct species of gastropods

Acteon aizyensis is an extinct species of sea snail, a marine gastropod mollusc in the family Acteonidae.

== Description ==
(Original description in French) The shell has an oval-oblong shape. The spire is quite long and pointed at the apex. It consists in the largest specimens of seven whorls. These whorls are narrow at first but quickly widen. They are not very convex and are joined by a suture bordered by a narrow furrow and accompanied by a narrow ramp which goes up to the summit. The body whorl is oval-oblong and attenuated forward. Its length is approximately three-fifths of the total length of the shell. Its entire surface, as well as that of the preceding whorls, is decorated with large, very regular riblets, not flattened, but convex, equal and a little wider than the interval between them. A large number of longitudinal lamellae pass over the convexity where they disappear almost completely, but they remain very prominent in the intervals which they cut into small quadrangular cavities. The aperture is long and very narrow, attenuated forward, where it slopes a little. The outer lip is sharp and finely crenulated. The columella is quite elongated and has a short, obtuse and subtransverse fold.

== Distribution ==
Fossils of this marine species have been found in Eocene strata in Picardy, France.
