= Acteon soyoae =

Scientific classification
- Kingdom: Animalia
- Phylum: Mollusca
- Class: Gastropoda
- Superfamily: Acteonoidea
- Family: Acteonidae
- Genus: Acteon
- Species: A. soyoae

Binomial name
- Acteon soyoae Habe, 1961

Species of marine gastropod

Acteon soyoae is a species of sea snail, a marine gastropod mollusc in the family Acteonidae.

== Description ==
The length of the shell varies between 8 mm and 14 mm.

== Distribution ==
This marine species occurs in the Indo-Pacific; also off Japan and the Philippines.
