= Acteon wangaloa =

Scientific classification
- Kingdom: Animalia
- Phylum: Mollusca
- Class: Gastropoda
- Superfamily: Acteonoidea
- Family: Acteonidae
- Genus: Acteon
- Species: †A. wangaloa

Binomial name
- †Acteon wangaloa H. J. Finlay & Marwick, 1937

Synonyms
- †

Extinct species of gastropods

Acteon wangaloa is an extinct species of sea snail, a marine gastropod mollusc in the family Acteonidae.

== Distribution ==
Fossils of this marine species have been found near the Kaitangata-Green Island, New Zealand
