= Acteon angolensis =

Scientific classification
- Kingdom: Animalia
- Phylum: Mollusca
- Class: Gastropoda
- Superfamily: Acteonoidea
- Family: Acteonidae
- Genus: Acteon
- Species: A. angolensis

Binomial name
- Acteon angolensis Poppe & Tagaro, 2023

Species of marine gastropod

Acteon angolensis is a species of sea snail, a marine gastropod mollusc in the family Acteonidae.

== Distribution ==
This marine species occurs in the Atlantic Ocean off Angola.
