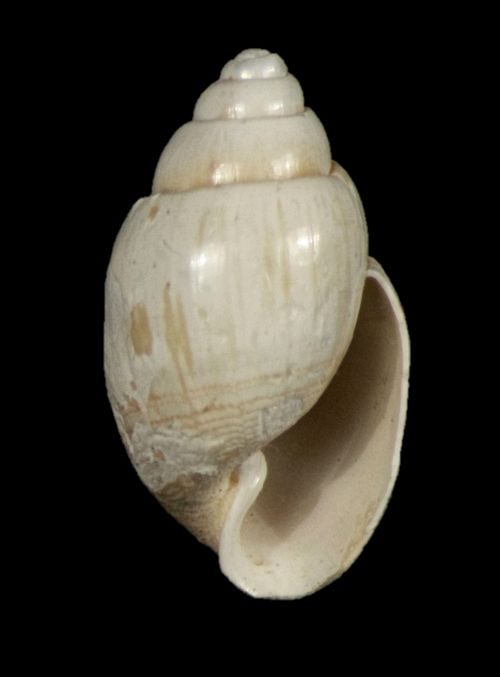
- Shell of Lanayrella vagabunda (specimen at Naturalis Biodiversity Center)

Scientific classification
- Kingdom: Animalia
- Phylum: Mollusca
- Class: Gastropoda
- Superfamily: Acteonoidea
- Family: Acteonidae
- Genus: Lanayrella
- Species: L. vagabunda

Binomial name
- Lanayrella vagabunda (Mabille, 1885)
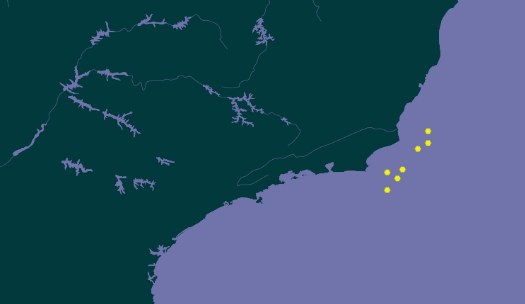

Synonyms
- Acteon vagabundus (Mabille, 1885); Toledonia vagabunda (Mabille, 1885); Tornatella vagabunda Mabille, 1885 (original combination)

= Lanayrella vagabunda =

Species of gastropod

Lanayrella vagabunda is a species of sea snail, a marine gastropod mollusk in the family Acteonidae.

== Description ==
The length of the shell attains 9 mm, its diameter 5 mm.

The ovate-conic shell is rather thin, solid, shining and dull reddish. It is spirally sulcate with the sulci on first whorls slightly elevated, about 5; on the body whorl 20 or 22, flattened and regularly spaced. The spire is elevated, conic-subpyramidal. The protoconch is large, white, lirate and mammillate. The contains five convex whorls, separated by an impressed suture, especially the earlier ones. The body whorl is large, two-thirds the entire length, slightly swollen, narrowed toward the base, and descending slowly to its termination. The aperture is nearly vertical and semi-ovate. The peristome is nearly straight, slightly thickened, the terminations joined by a very thin white callus. The simple outer lip is well curved. The basal margin is slightly thickened and effuse. The columellar lip is appressed. The columella is white, thickened, twisted, divided by a superficial groove, prolonged to the base of the aperture.

== Distribution ==
This marine species occurs off Cape Horn, Chile; in the Atlantic Ocean off Brazil and Argentina.
