= Acteon ringiculoides =

Scientific classification
- Kingdom: Animalia
- Phylum: Mollusca
- Class: Gastropoda
- Superfamily: Acteonoidea
- Family: Acteonidae
- Genus: Acteon
- Species: A. ringiculoides

Binomial name
- Acteon ringiculoides Á. Valdés, 2008

Species of marine gastropod

Acteon ringiculoides is a species of sea snail, a marine gastropod mollusc in the family Acteonidae.

== Description ==
The length of the shell attains 11 mm.

== Distribution ==
This marine species occurs in the Pacific off New Caledonia at the Norfolk Ridge at depths between 235 m and 280 m.
