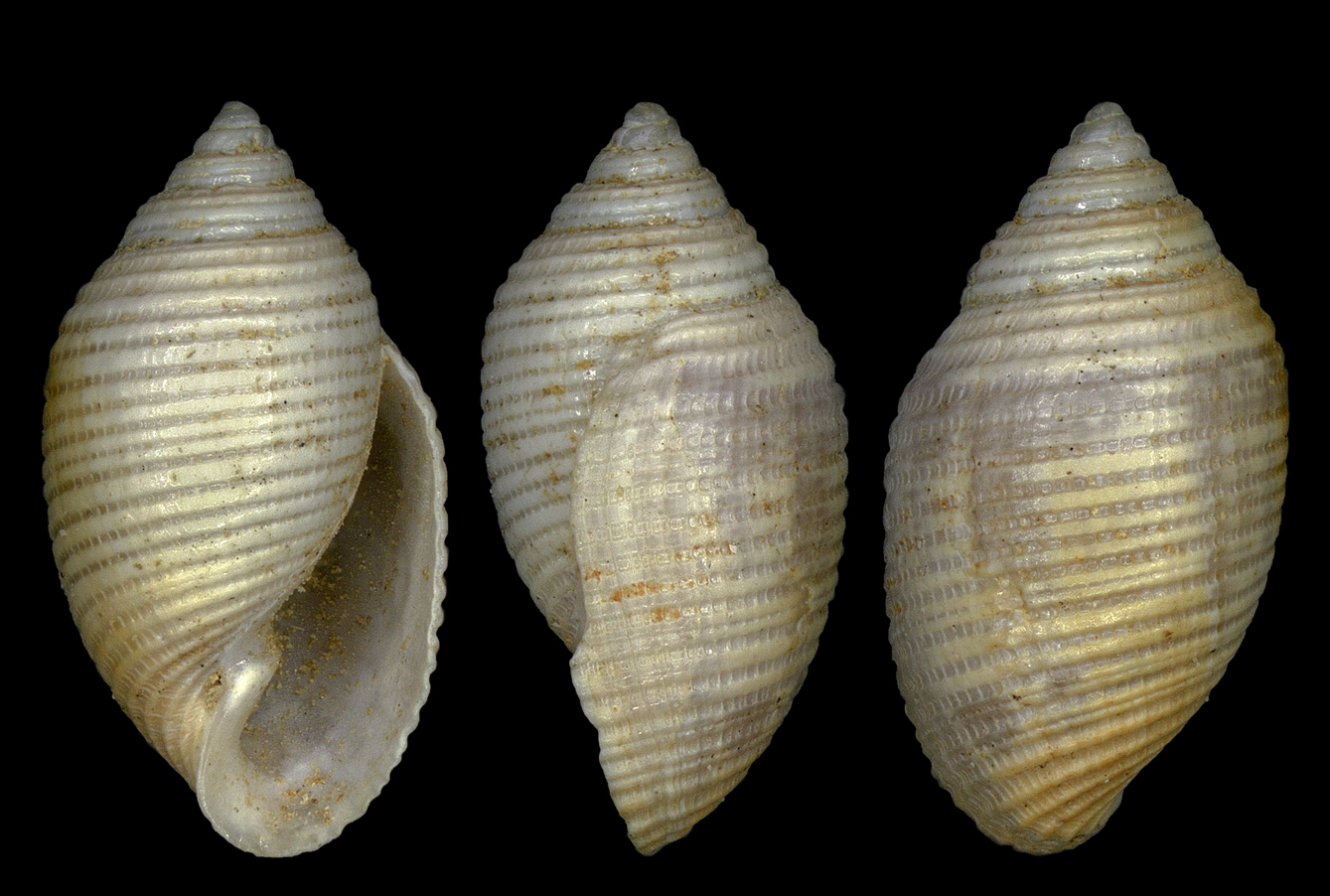
- Shell of † Acteon funiculifer (paratype at MNHN, Paris)

Scientific classification
- Kingdom: Animalia
- Phylum: Mollusca
- Class: Gastropoda
- Superfamily: Acteonoidea
- Family: Acteonidae
- Genus: Acteon
- Species: †A. funiculifer

Binomial name
- †Acteon funiculifer (Cossmann, 1897)

Synonyms
- † Actaeon funiculifer Cossmann, 1897 (superseded combination)

= Acteon funiculifer =

Extinct species of gastropods

Acteon funiculifer is an extinct species of sea snail, a marine gastropod mollusc in the family Acteonidae.

== Distribution ==
Fossils of this marine species have been found in Eocene strata in Victoria, Australia.
