= Acteon inflatus =

Scientific classification
- Kingdom: Animalia
- Phylum: Mollusca
- Class: Gastropoda
- Superfamily: Acteonoidea
- Family: Acteonidae
- Genus: Acteon
- Species: †A. inflatus

Binomial name
- †Acteon inflatus (Stilwell & Zinsmeister, 1992)

Synonyms
- † Gumina inflata Stilwell & Zinsmeister, 1992 ·

Extinct species of gastropods

Acteon inflatus is an extinct species of sea snail, a marine gastropod mollusc in the family Acteonidae.

== Distribution ==
Fossils of this marine species have been found in Seymour Island, Antarctic Peninsula.
