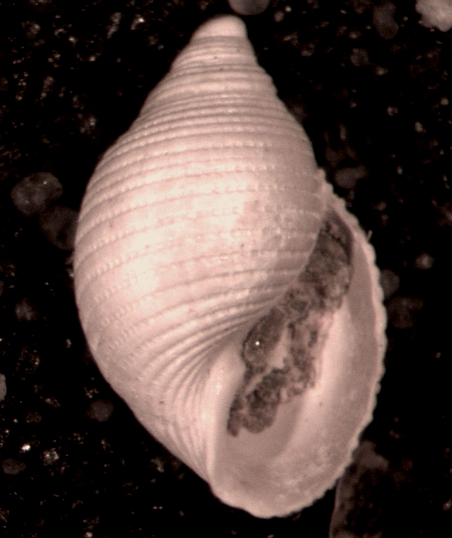
- Shell of Acteon pomilius (specimen at the Paleontological Research Institution)

Scientific classification
- Kingdom: Animalia
- Phylum: Mollusca
- Class: Gastropoda
- Superfamily: Acteonoidea
- Family: Acteonidae
- Genus: Acteon
- Species: †A. pomilius

Binomial name
- †Acteon pomilius Conrad, 1833

Synonyms
- † Actaeon annectens Meyer, 1886; † Acteon elegans (I. Lea, 1833); † Monoptygma elegans I. Lea, 1833

= Acteon pomilius =

Extinct species of gastropods

Acteon pomilius is an extinct species of sea snail, a marine gastropod mollusc in the family Acteonidae.

Variety

- † Acteon pomilius var. multannulatus Aldrich, 1908 (taxon inquirendum)

== Distribution ==
Fossils of this marine species have been found in Eocene strata in Alabama, USA.
