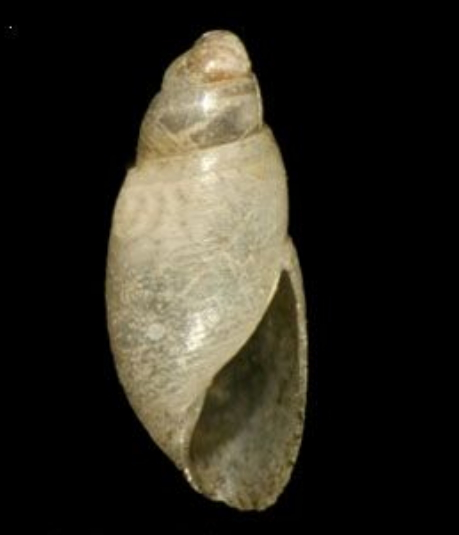
- Shell of Crenilabium exile (specimen at the Natural History Museum, Rotterdam)

Scientific classification
- Kingdom: Animalia
- Phylum: Mollusca
- Class: Gastropoda
- Superfamily: Acteonoidea
- Family: Acteonidae
- Genus: Crenilabium
- Species: C. exile

Binomial name
- Crenilabium exile (Jeffreys, 1870)
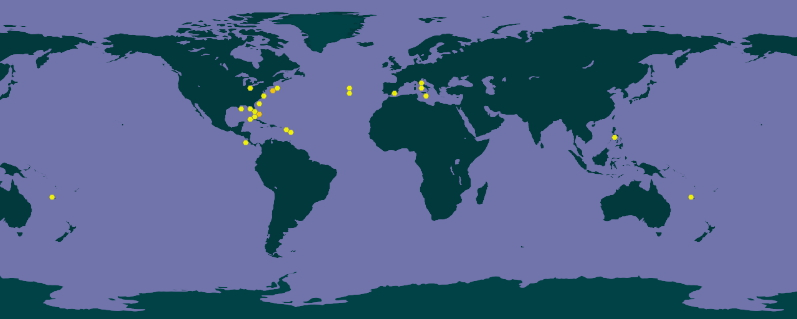

Synonyms
- Actaeon etheridgii A. Bell, 1870; Actaeon nitidus A. E. Verrill, 1882 superseded combination; Acteon browni H. K. Jordan, 1895; Acteon exilis Jeffreys, 1870 (original combination); Acteon liostracoides Dall, 1927; Acteon proprius Dall, 1927; Auriculina insculpta (Montagu, 1808) sensu A. E. Verrill, 1880 (misapplication); Crenilabium exilis [sic] (incorrect gender ending); Crenilabrum exile (Jeffreys, 1870) (spelling mistake in genus name)

= Crenilabium exile =

Species of gastropod

Crenilabium exile is a species of sea snail, a marine gastropod mollusk in the family Acteonidae.

== Description ==
The length of the shell varies between 6 mm and 11 mm.

(Described as Acteon exilis)The oblong or somewhat spindle-shaped shell is semitransparent and glossy. The sculpture consists of numerous spiral strisa or impressed lines, which are quite smooth or plain, instead of being punctate as in other species of this family. The color is clear white. The spire is elongated, with a blunt apex. There three moderately convex whorls. The body whorl occupies three-fourths of the spire. The first whorl is mammiform. The suture is distinct and margined. The aperture is rather narrow, irregularly pear-shaped and expanded at the base. Its length is three-fifths of the shell. The outer lip is gently curved, and folds inwards. The inner lip is folded back on the lower part. The columella is flexuous. The fold in the columella is strong and conspicuous.

== Distribution ==
This marine species has a wide distribution. It occurs off the Atlantic Ocean off USA (from Massachusetts to Florida); Iceland; Azores; Bay of Biscay; Portugal, West Africa; Mediterranean Sea off Spain, Malta, Italy; in the Caribbean Sea off East Mexico, Cuba, Costa Rica, Grenada, Martinique and Guadeloupe
