= Acteon procratericulatus =

Scientific classification
- Kingdom: Animalia
- Phylum: Mollusca
- Class: Gastropoda
- Superfamily: Acteonoidea
- Family: Acteonidae
- Genus: Acteon
- Species: †A. procratericulatus

Binomial name
- †Acteon procratericulatus Laws, 1939

Synonyms
- † Acteon (Maxacteon) procratericulatus Laws, 1939 alternative representation

Extinct species of gastropods

Acteon procratericulatus is an extinct species of sea snail, a marine gastropod mollusc in the family Acteonidae.

== Description ==
The length of the shell (spire missing) attains 7.5 mm, its diameter is 4 mm.

== Distribution ==
Fossils of this marine species have been found in Tertiary strata in Kaipara, New Zealand.
