= Acteon archibenthicola =

Scientific classification
- Kingdom: Animalia
- Phylum: Mollusca
- Class: Gastropoda
- Superfamily: Acteonoidea
- Family: Acteonidae
- Genus: Acteon
- Species: A. archibenthicola

Binomial name
- Acteon archibenthicola Habe, 1955

Species of marine gastropod

Acteon archibenthicola is a species of sea snail, a marine gastropod mollusc in the family Acteonidae.

== Description ==
The length of the shell attains 4.5mm.

== Distribution ==
This marine species occurs off Japan.
