= Acteon gilberti =

Scientific classification
- Kingdom: Animalia
- Phylum: Mollusca
- Class: Gastropoda
- Superfamily: Acteonoidea
- Family: Acteonidae
- Genus: Acteon
- Species: †A. gilberti

Binomial name
- †Acteon gilberti Cossmann, 1889

Synonyms
- † Actaeon gilberti Cossmann, 1889

Extinct species of gastropods

Acteon gilberti is an extinct species of sea snail, a marine gastropod mollusc in the family Acteonidae.

== Distribution ==
Fossils of this marine species have been found in Paleocene strata in Champagne-Ardenne, France.
