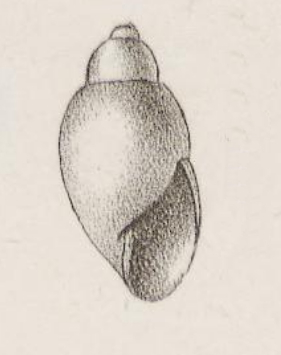
- Shell of † Acteon glans (holotype)

Scientific classification
- Kingdom: Animalia
- Phylum: Mollusca
- Class: Gastropoda
- Superfamily: Acteonoidea
- Family: Acteonidae
- Genus: Acteon
- Species: †A. glans

Binomial name
- †Acteon glans I. Lea, 1846

= Acteon glans =

Extinct species of gastropods

Acteon glans is an extinct species of sea snail, a marine gastropod mollusc in the family Acteonidae.

== Description ==
(Original description) The thin shell is sub-ovate, imperforate, smooth and glabrous. The spire is ovately-conical, short and mamillate. The sutures are deep. The shell contains four whorls, very slightly convex, sub-canaliculate at the upper suture. The body whorl is rounded. The base of the shell is smooth. The aperture is ovate and very effuse. The fold on the columella is small and oblique.

== Distribution ==
Fossils of this marine species have been found in Late Miocene to Middle Pliocene strata of the Yorktown Formation in Virginia, USA.
