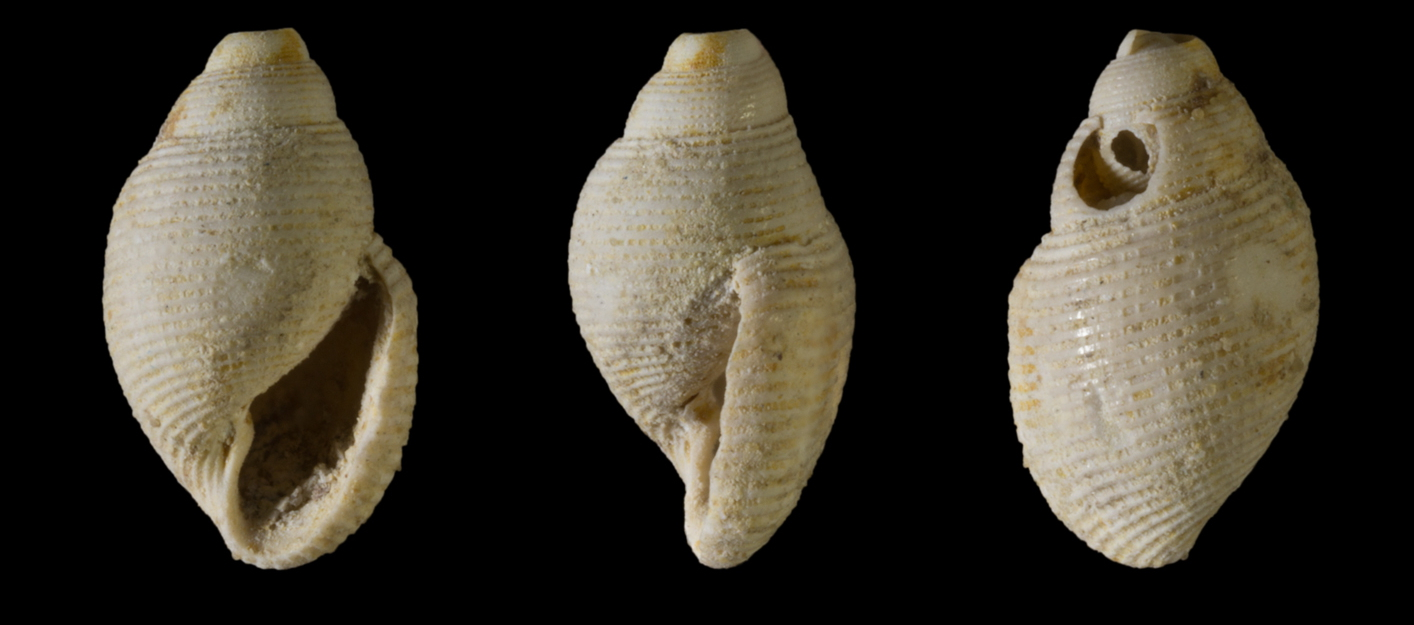
- Shell of † Acteon bezanconi (specimen at MNHN, Paris)

Scientific classification
- Kingdom: Animalia
- Phylum: Mollusca
- Class: Gastropoda
- Superfamily: Acteonoidea
- Family: Acteonidae
- Genus: Acteon
- Species: †A. bezanconi

Binomial name
- †Acteon bezanconi Cossmann, 1889

Synonyms
- † Actaeon bezanconi Cossmann, 1889

= Acteon bezanconi =

Extinct species of gastropods

Acteon bezanconi is an extinct species of sea snail, a marine gastropod mollusc in the family Acteonidae.

== Distribution ==
Fossils of this marine species have been found in Eocene strata in Loire-Atlantique, France.
