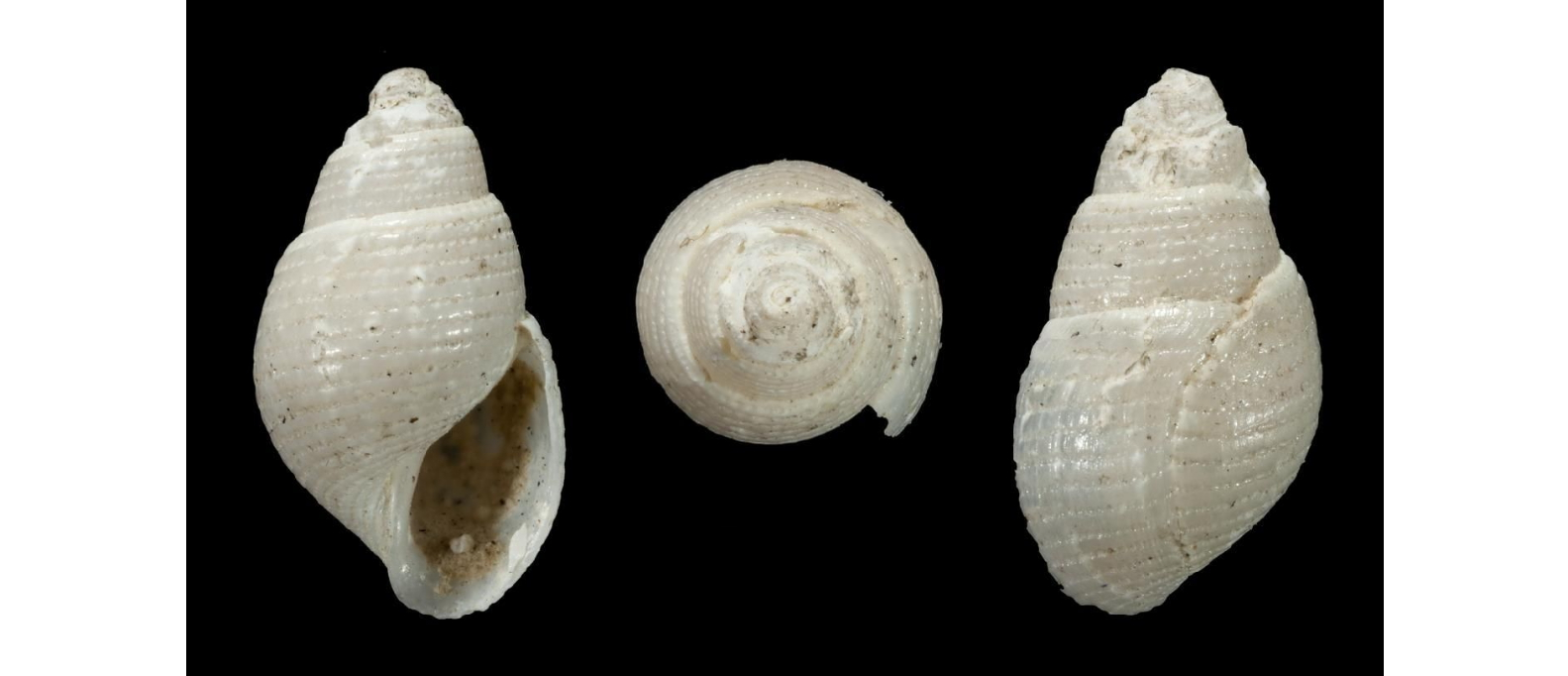
- Shell of Callostracon amabile (specimen at the Natural History Museum, London)

Scientific classification
- Kingdom: Animalia
- Phylum: Mollusca
- Class: Gastropoda
- Superfamily: Acteonoidea
- Family: Acteonidae
- Genus: Callostracon
- Species: C. amabile

Binomial name
- Callostracon amabile (R. B. Watson, 1883)
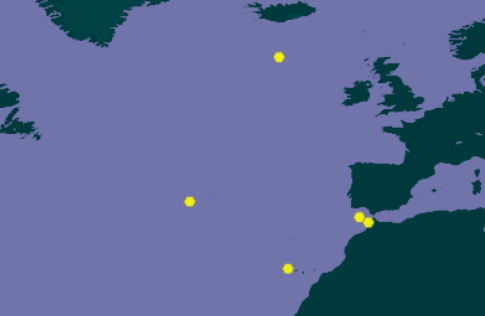

Synonyms
- Actaeon amabilis R. B. Watson, 1883; Colostracon amabile (R. B. Watson, 1883)

= Callostracon amabile =

Species of marine gastropod

Callostracon amabile is a species of sea snail, a marine gastropod mollusc in the family Acteonidae.

== Description ==
The small, ovate shell is white. The whorls are flattened, the spire is subscalar, the apex is very blunt, the smallish aperture is pear-shaped and there is a very slight tooth on the columella.

Sculpture: Longitudinals: there are very faint hair-like lines of growth. Spirals: there are on the body whorl about 20, on the penultimate whorl about 8 rather strong and equal furrows stippled with roundish oval pits. They become more crowded and weaker toward the middle of the base. Just below the suture the first furrow is minutely and slightly beaded, and it with the next one or two is strong and these are crowded. The flat surface which parts them is somewhat broader than the furrows.

The color of the shell is translucent and subglossy white.

The spire is conical, high and scarcely scalar. The apex is blunt and truncated. The extreme tip is a very little inverted. The shell contains five whorls, very slightly shouldered just below the suture. Round the top there is a very feeble constriction. Below this the whorl is conical, and in profile flat on the sides. The body whorl is a very little tumid with a produced base. The suture is very little oblique, strongish and well marked, but not channelled. The aperture is pear-shaped, pointed above, a little oblique in direction, patulous or very slightly guttered in front of the columellar point. The outer lip is straight and parallel to the axis, and a little contracted above, arched and patulous in front. The inner lip is slightly convex on the body, on which there is a thin but distinct glaze with a defined edge. There is a slight angulation at the junction of the body and the columella, near the top of which is a very faint tooth amounting to no more than a slight swelling. The columella itself is very slightly oblique, and is straight, narrow with a sharp edge behind which is a very slight and shallow furrow.

== Distribution ==
This marine species occurs off Morocco, Portugal and Spain.
