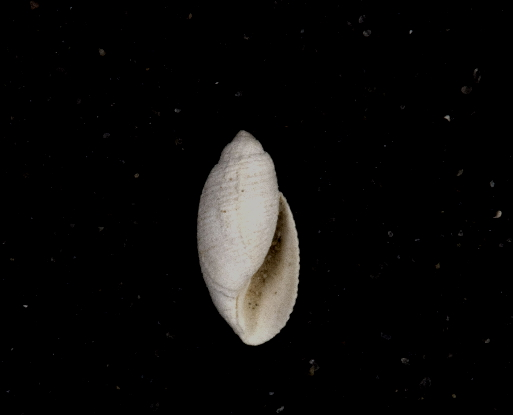
- Shell of Acteon traskii (specimen at the Paleontological Research Institution)

Scientific classification
- Kingdom: Animalia
- Phylum: Mollusca
- Class: Gastropoda
- Superfamily: Acteonoidea
- Family: Acteonidae
- Genus: Acteon
- Species: A. traskii

Binomial name
- Acteon traskii Stearns, 1897
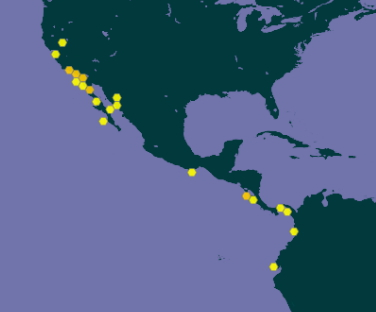

= Acteon traskii =

Species of marine gastropod

Acteon traskii is a species of sea snail, a marine gastropod mollusc in the family Acteonidae.

== Description ==
The length of the shell varies between 5 mm and 18 mm.

(Original description) The small shell is conical above, rounded below, rather solid and glossy. It is sculptured by numerous fine impressed lines or grooves which become wider toward the base of the body whorl, making the sculpture of this part of the shell lirate . The lirae are sometimes slightly grooved. Otherwise they are sculptured by sharp, close set incremental threads, these are subordinate to the spiral sculpture.

The color of the shell is dull cream-white with two obscure rufous bands on the body whorl.

The spire is short and obtusely conical. The shell contains six whorls. The sutures are distinct and are narrowly channelled. The aperture measures about two-thirds of the length of the shell. It is sharply angulated above, rounded and effuse below, finely lirate and glossy within, with a thin glazing on the body whorl. The outer lip is simple. The columella is short, with a fold curving around to and thickening the edge of the lip below, which is moderately produced.

== Distribution ==
This marine species occurs in the Pacific Ocean from Santa Barbara, California to Colombia and Peru.; depths: 3–100 m, rarely to 305 m.
