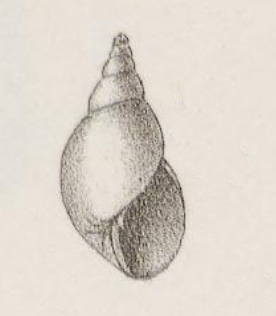
- Shell of Acteon nitens (holotype)

Scientific classification
- Kingdom: Animalia
- Phylum: Mollusca
- Class: Gastropoda
- Superfamily: Acteonoidea
- Family: Acteonidae
- Genus: Acteon
- Species: †A. nitens

Binomial name
- †Acteon nitens I. Lea, 1846

= Acteon nitens =

Extinct species of gastropods

Acteon nitens is an extinct species of sea snail, a marine gastropod mollusc in the family Acteonidae.

== Description ==
(Original description) The thick shell is ovate-acuminate, perforate, smooth and polished. The spire is subulate and mamillate. The sutures are impressed and deep. The shell contains five, convex whorls. The body whorl is rounded. The base of the shell is smooth. The perforation is small. The aperture is ovate, elongated and effuse. The fold on the columella is obtuse and thick.

Remarks.—The aperture is large, acute above and rounded and effuse below. The body whorl expands rather suddenly beyond the line of the rest, and is more than half the length of the shell. The fold on the columella is broad at base, but slightly elevated, and obtuse. The surface of the shell is remarkably glabrous and shining.

== Distribution ==
Fossils of this marine species have been found in Late Miocene to Middle Pliocene strata of the Yorktown Formation in Virginia, USA.
