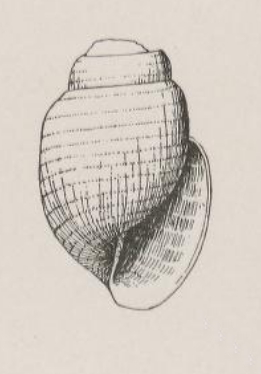
- Shell of Acteon panamensis (holotype)

Scientific classification
- Kingdom: Animalia
- Phylum: Mollusca
- Class: Gastropoda
- Superfamily: Acteonoidea
- Family: Acteonidae
- Genus: Acteon
- Species: A. panamensis

Binomial name
- Acteon panamensis Dall, 1908

= Acteon panamensis =

Species of marine gastropod

Acteon panamensis is a species of sea snail, a marine gastropod mollusc in the family Acteonidae.

== Description ==
The length of the shell attains 7.04 mm, its diameter 4.5 mm.

(Original description) The apex of the shell is badly eroded, but apparently blunt. The shell contains about four whorls, the body whorl much the largest. The spire is shorter than the aperture. The suture is strongly marked. The whorl in front of it is abrupt, but not channelled. The periostracum pale yellowish, nearly transparent and polished. The sculpture consists of (on the penultimate whorl four) sharp distant spiral, fine, microscopically punctate, incised lines. These increase on the body whorl to about fifteen, of which five or six on the base are closer, the remainder, on the sides of the whorl, are less crowded, subequidistant, and similar. The shell is obscurely parallel-sided, slightly rounded, with a rounded and slightly protracted base. The aperture is narrow and is rounded in front. The outer lip is sharp, simple, or minutely notched by the incised spiral lines. The body of the shell shows a slight wash of callus. The columella is straight, short and has a single obscure fold near the middle, which lags behind the aperture. There is no umbilical perforation.

== Distribution ==
This marine species occurs off in the Gulf of Panama.
