= Maxacteon hancocki =

Scientific classification
- Kingdom: Animalia
- Phylum: Mollusca
- Class: Gastropoda
- Family: Acteonidae
- Genus: Maxacteon
- Species: M. hancocki

Binomial name
- Maxacteon hancocki (Rudman, 1971)

Synonyms
- Acteon (Maxacteon) hancocki (Rudman, 1971)

Species of gastropod

Maxacteon hancocki is a species of small sea snail, a marine opisthobranch gastropod mollusk in the family Acteonidae, the barrel bubble snails.

== Description ==
The length of the shell attains 6 mm. It has a headshield with a pair of fleshy lobes; thin operculum. The white shell shows orange-brown markings at the base and at the apex. It contains a large body whorl. The large columella is slightly twisted. The shell is sculptured with grooves

== Distribution ==
This species is found in moderately deep water off the northern coast of North Island, New Zealand.
