= Maxacteon milleri =

Scientific classification
- Kingdom: Animalia
- Phylum: Mollusca
- Class: Gastropoda
- Family: Acteonidae
- Genus: Maxacteon
- Species: M. milleri

Binomial name
- Maxacteon milleri (Rudman, 1971)

Synonyms
- Acteon (Maxacteon) milleri (Rudman, 1971)

Species of gastropod

Maxacteon milleri is a species of small sea snail, a predatory marine gastropod mollusc in the family Acteonidae, the barrel bubble snails.

== Distribution ==
This marine species is endemic to New Zealand.
