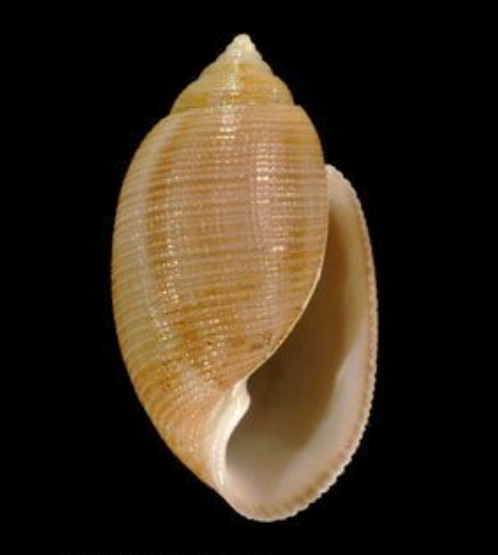
- Shell of Mysouffa cumingii (specimen at the Natural History Museum, Rotterdam)

Scientific classification
- Kingdom: Animalia
- Phylum: Mollusca
- Class: Gastropoda
- Subterclass: Acteonimorpha
- Superfamily: Acteonoidea
- Family: Acteonidae
- Genus: Mysouffa; Marcus, 1974

Type species
- Acteon cumingii A. Adams, 1855
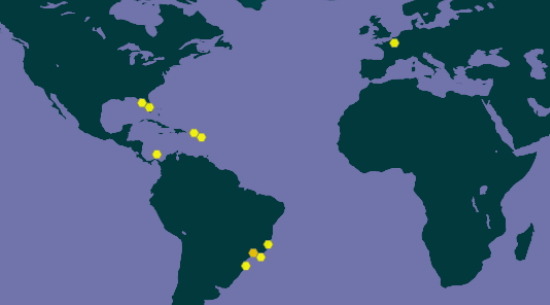

= Mysouffa =

Genus of gastropods

Mysouffa is a genus of small predatory sea snails, marine gastropod molluscs in the family Acteonidae, the barrel bubble snails.

== Species ==
Species within the genus Mysouffa include:

- Mysouffa cumingii (A. Adams, 1855)
- Mysouffa turrita (R. B. Watson, 1883)
