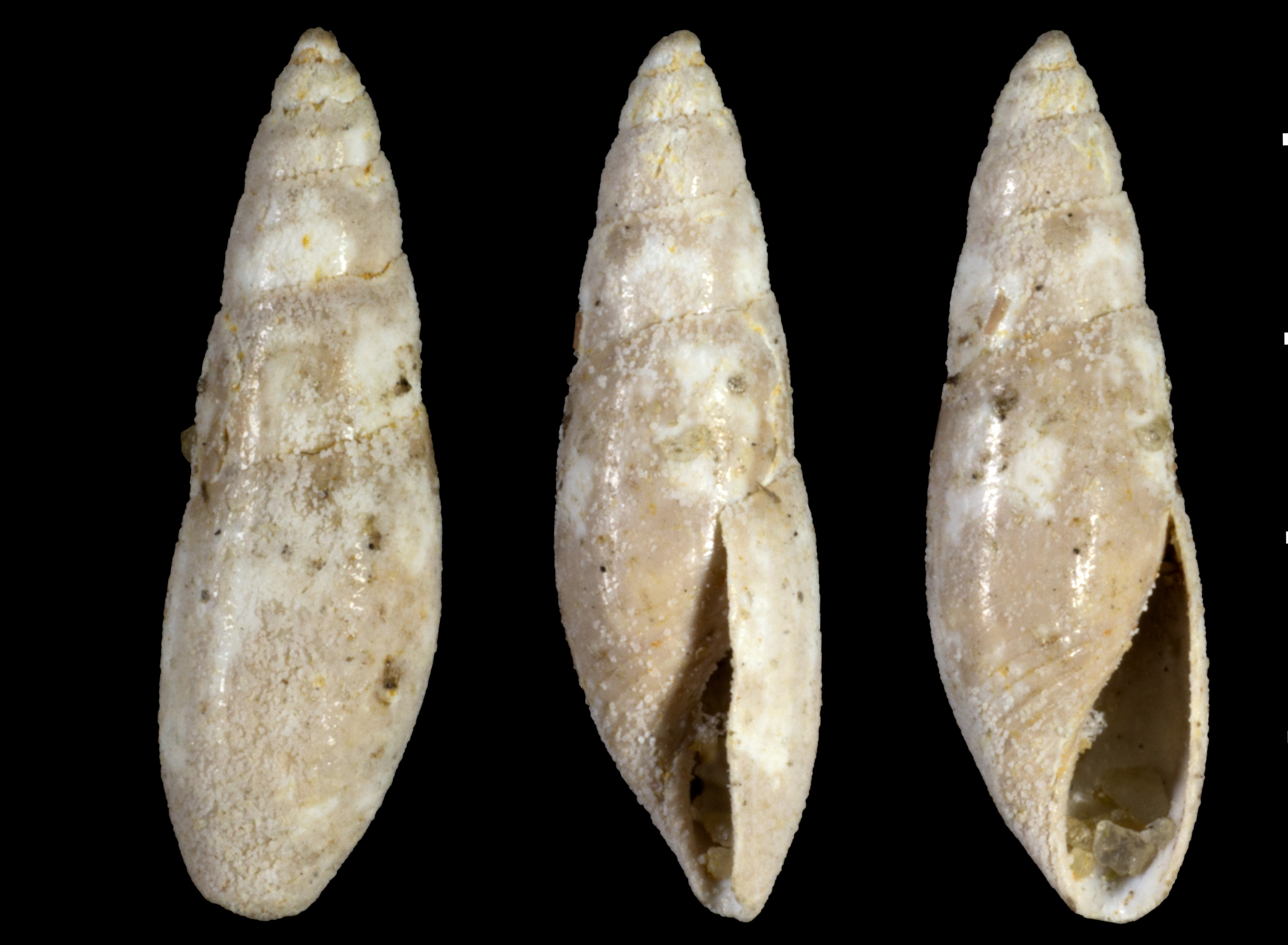
- Shell of † Crenilabium aciculatum (specimen at MNHN, Paris)

Scientific classification
- Kingdom: Animalia
- Phylum: Mollusca
- Class: Gastropoda
- Subterclass: Acteonimorpha
- Superfamily: Acteonoidea
- Family: Acteonidae
- Genus: Crenilabium; Cossmann, 1889

Synonyms
- Actaeon (Lissactaeon) Monterosato, 1890 · unaccepted; Crenilabrum (Incorrect subsequent spelling); Lissactaeon Monterosato, 1890 ·

= Crenilabium =

Genus of gastropods

Crenilabium is a genus of small predatory sea snails, marine gastropod molluscs in the family Acteonidae, the barrel bubble snails.

== Species ==
Species within the genus Crenilabium include:

- † Crenilabium aciculatum (Cossmann, 1889)
- † Crenilabium austropsomum Stilwell & Zinsmeister, 1992
- Crenilabium birmani Simone, 2006
- † Crenilabium elatum (Koenen, 1855)
- † Crenilabium elongatum (J. De C. Sowerby, 1824)
- Crenilabium exile (Jeffreys, 1870)
- Crenilabium orientalis (Thiele, 1925)
- Crenilabium pacificum (Kuroda & Habe, 1961)
- † Crenilabium pourcyense (Cossmann, 1907)
- † Crenilabium starboroughense (L. C. King, 1934)
- † Crenilabium suromaximum Stilwell & Zinsmeister, 1992
- † Crenilabium terebelloides (R. A. Philippi, 1844)
- † Crenilabium zelandicum P. Marshall, 1918

Synonyms

- Crenilabium exilis [sic]: synonym of Crenilabium exile (Jeffreys, 1870) (incorrect gender ending)
- † Crenilabium obsoletum Marwick, 1965: synonym of † Crenilabium starboroughense (L. C. King, 1934)
