= Lanayrella =

Scientific classification
- Kingdom: Animalia
- Phylum: Mollusca
- Class: Gastropoda
- Subterclass: Acteonimorpha
- Superfamily: Acteonoidea
- Family: Acteonidae
- Genus: Lanayrella; Salvador & C. Cunha, 2020

Type species
- Tornatella vagabunda Mabille, 1885

Genus of gastropods

Lanayrella is a genus of small predatory sea snails, marine gastropod molluscs in the family Acteonidae, the barrel bubble snails.

== Distribution ==
This marine species occurs off Tierra del Fuego.

== Species ==
Species within the genus Lanayrella include:

- Lanayrella ringei (Strebel, 1905)
- Lanayrella vagabunda (Mabille, 1885)
