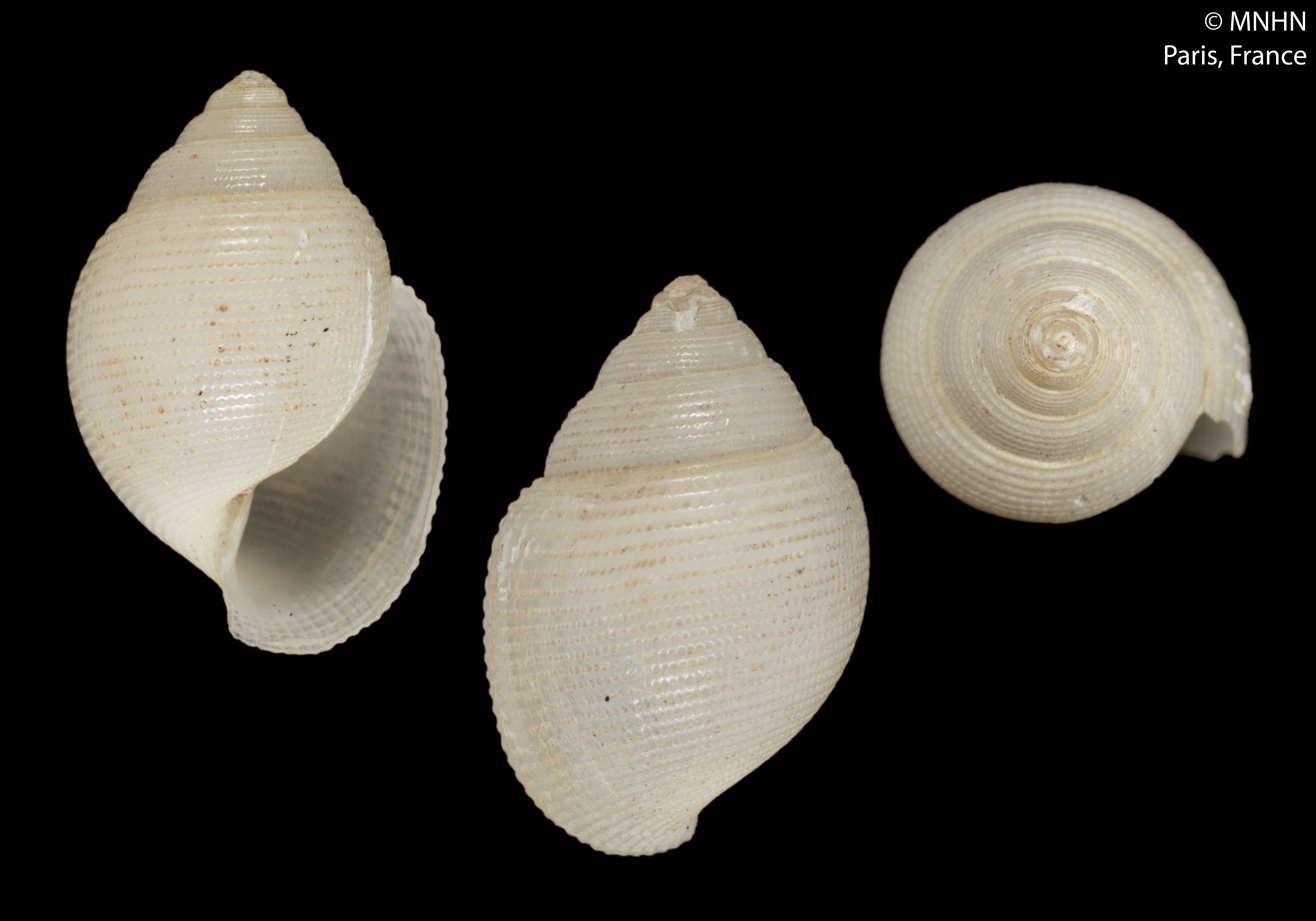
- Shell of Inopinodon azoricus (holotype at MNHN, Paris)

Scientific classification
- Kingdom: Animalia
- Phylum: Mollusca
- Class: Gastropoda
- Subterclass: Acteonimorpha
- Superfamily: Acteonoidea
- Family: Acteonidae
- Genus: Inopinodon; Bouchet, 1975

Type species
- Actaeon azoricus Locard, 1897

= Inopinodon =

Genus of gastropods

Inopinodon is a genus of small predatory sea snails, marine gastropod molluscs in the family Acteonidae, the barrel bubble snails.

== Species ==
Species within the genus Inopinodon include:

- Inopinodon azoricus (Locard, 1897)
