= Neactaeonina inexpectata =

Scientific classification
- Kingdom: Animalia
- Phylum: Mollusca
- Class: Gastropoda
- Family: Acteonidae
- Genus: Neactaeonina
- Species: N. inexpectata

Binomial name
- Neactaeonina inexpectata Dell, 1956

Species of gastropod

Neactaeonina inexpectata is a species of small sea snail, a predatory marine gastropod mollusc in the family Acteonidae, the barrel bubble snails.

== Distribution ==
This species occurs in New Zealand.
