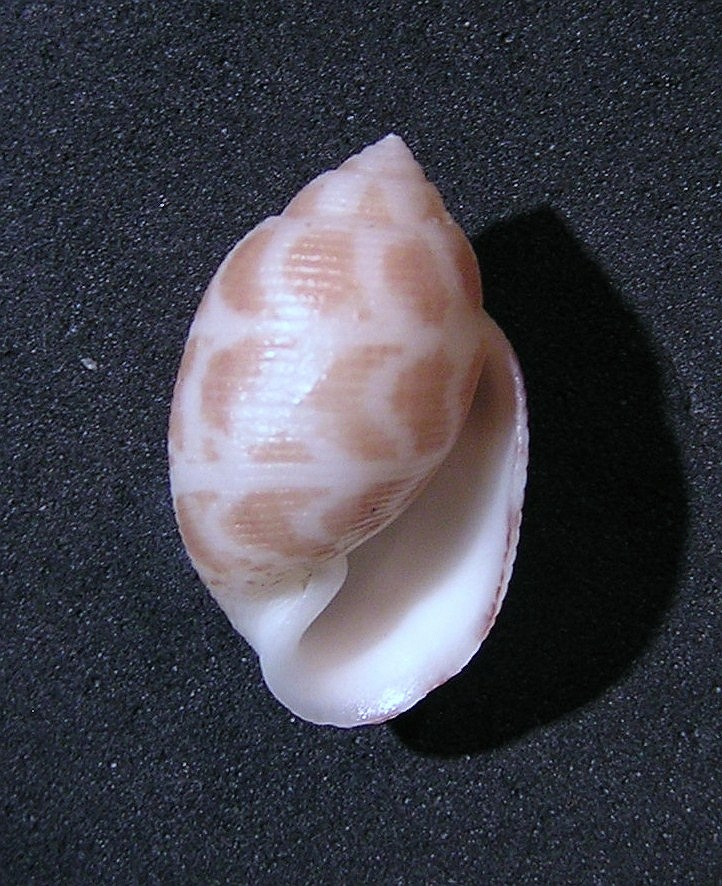
- Apertural view of a shell of Maxacteon flammeus

Scientific classification
- Kingdom: Animalia
- Phylum: Mollusca
- Class: Gastropoda
- Family: Acteonidae
- Genus: Maxacteon
- Species: M. flammeus

Binomial name
- Maxacteon flammeus (Bruguière, 1789)

Synonyms
- Actaeon flammea [sic] (incorrect gender ending); Actaeon flammeus (Bruguière, 1789); Acteon flammea [sic] (incorrect gender ending); Acteon flammeus (Bruguière, 1789); Buccinum flammeum Bruguière, 1789 (original combination); Pupa flammea (Gmelin, 1791); Solidula flammea (Gmelin, 1791); Tornatella flammea Gmelin, 1791

= Maxacteon flammeus =

Species of gastropod

Maxacteon flammeus is a species of small sea snail, a marine opisthobranch gastropod mollusk in the family Acteonidae, the barrel bubble snails.

== Description ==
The length of the shell attains 15mm, its width 9mm

The thick shell is ovate and inflated. Its ground color is white, covered with transverse striae and longitudinal waving reddish lines, often divided into three portions in their length. The conoid spire is canaliculated, composed of six whorls, the upper ones very approximate, the lowest much larger than all the others. The oblong aperture is widened, dilated at its base. The outer lip is very thin, almost sharp. The oblique columella, is slightly twisted. The operculum is thin.

The headshield is developing secondary tentacles.

== Distribution ==
This species occurs in the Red Sea, in the Indian Ocean off Madagascar, Mauritius and the Mascarene Basin; in the tropical West Pacific; also off Tonga, New Zealand.and Australia (Western Australia).
