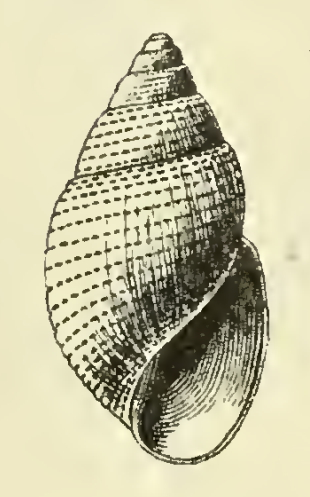
- Drawing of a shell of Acteon delicatus

Scientific classification
- Kingdom: Animalia
- Phylum: Mollusca
- Class: Gastropoda
- Superfamily: Acteonoidea
- Family: Acteonidae
- Genus: Acteon
- Species: A. delicatus

Binomial name
- Acteon delicatus Dall, 1889

Synonyms
- Actaeon perforatus Dall, 1881

= Acteon delicatus =

Species of marine gastropod

Acteon delicatus is a species of sea snail, a marine gastropod mollusc in the family Acteonidae.

== Description ==
The length of the shell attains 10 mm, its diameter 5.6 mm.

(Original description) The ovate shell is white, or suffused with rose pink, not in bands but generally, or in longitudinal flammules, with usually a white margin in front of the suture. There are six or seven whorls, the body whorl more than half the length of the shell. They are regularly rounded and grooved by, on the body whorl, 20-30 strong, rather deep, coarsely punctate grooves between rounded interspaces. The lines of growth are quite perceptible. The suture is somewhat appressed, not channelled. The aperture is more than half as long as the shell. The outer lip is thin. The inner lip is hardly callous. The columella is straight, without any chink behind it, and bears a single moderate fold. The protoconch is small, mostly immersed in the succeeding whorl. The apex is not acute. The surface is usually not polished.

== Distribution ==
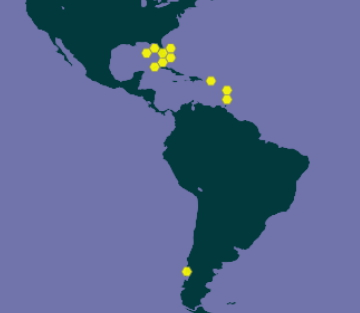
Distribution

This marine species occurs in the Caribbean Sea off Mexico, Cuba, Barbados and Saint Lucia; in the Gulf of Mexico off the mouth of the Mississippi River.
