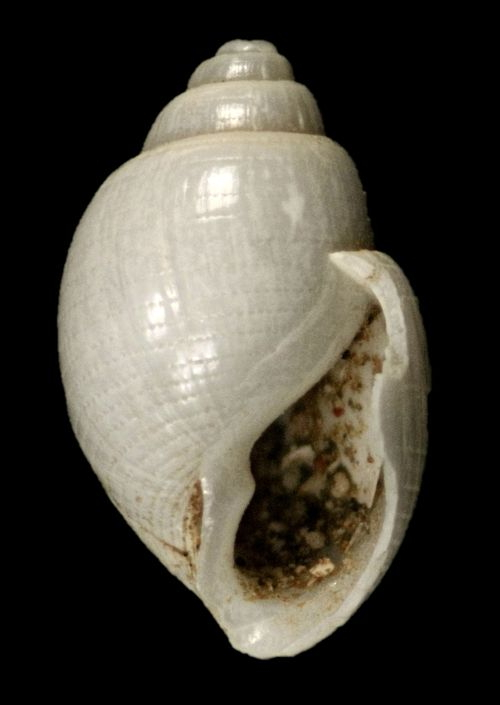
- Shell of Rapturella globulina (specimen at Naturalis Biodiversity Center)

Scientific classification
- Kingdom: Animalia
- Phylum: Mollusca
- Class: Gastropoda
- Subterclass: Acteonimorpha
- Superfamily: Acteonoidea
- Family: Acteonidae
- Genus: Rapturella; Salvador & C. Cunha, 2016

Type species
- Tornatella globulina Forbes, 1844

= Rapturella =

Genus of gastropods

Rapturella is a genus of small sea snails, predatory marine gastropod mollusks in the family Acteonidae, the barrel bubble snails.

== Species ==
- Rapturella atlas C. Cunha & Simone, 2018
- Rapturella globulina (Forbes, 1844)
- Rapturella ryani Salvador & C. Cunha, 2016
