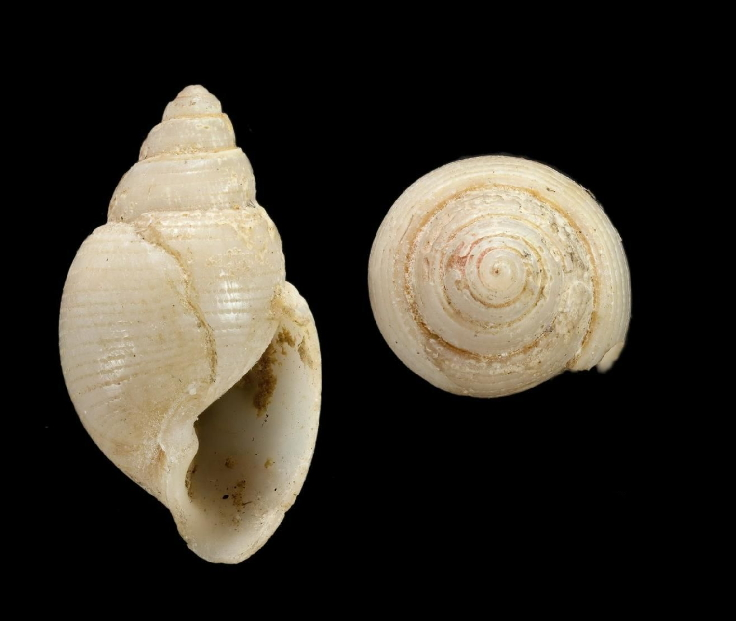
- Shell of Mysouffa turrita (specimen at the Natural History Museum, London)

Scientific classification
- Kingdom: Animalia
- Phylum: Mollusca
- Class: Gastropoda
- Superfamily: Acteonoidea
- Family: Acteonidae
- Genus: Mysouffa
- Species: M. turrita

Binomial name
- Mysouffa turrita (R. B. Watson, 1883)
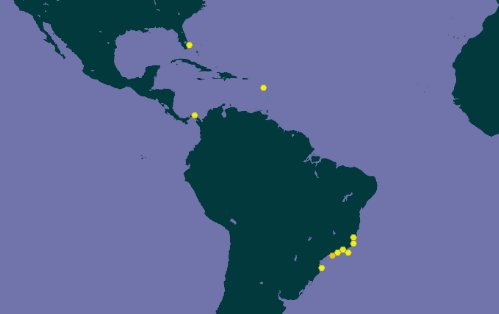

Synonyms
- Actaeon grimaldii Dautzenberg & H. Fischer, 1896; Actaeon turritus R. B. Watson, 1883 (basionym); Tomlinula turrita (R. B. Watson, 1883) superseded combination

= Mysouffa turrita =

Species of gastropod

Mysouffa turrita is a species of sea snail, a marine gastropod mollusk in the family Acteonidae.

== Description ==
(Described as Actaeon turritus) The strongish, oblong shell is pale yellow, translucent and somewhat glossy. It has a high conical coarsely tipped spire and rounded striated whorls.

Sculpture: Longitudinals - there are many feeble lines of growth. Spirals - the surface of the shell is scored with narrow shallow, irregular, unequal, distant furrows formed by hardly continuous stipples, which are round on the upper whorls and oblong on the body whorl. Between these furrows there often occurs a weaker one formed in the same way. On the base of the shell they are small and crowded. Toward the upper suture they are strong.

Colour: the shell itself is translucent white, but is covered with very thin yellow membranaceous epidermis.

The spire is high, conical, and scalar. The protoconch is very coarse and blunt, slightly immersed, but not inverted. The shell contains six whorls, rounded above, cylindrical below. The body whorl is short and slightly tumid. The suture is very little oblique, strong and somewhat channelled. The aperture is oval to pear-shaped. The outer lip leaves the body at a right angle. It is regularly arched throughout and patulous in front. A thin defined glaze crosses the inner lip and runs direct down the columella with a straight sharp edge, behind which is a minute chink. The tooth, which is close up to the body, is very slight and blunt.

== Distribution ==
This marine species occurs in the Atlantic Ocean off Brazil; in the Caribbean Sea off Panama, Guadeloupe, the Virgin Islands.
