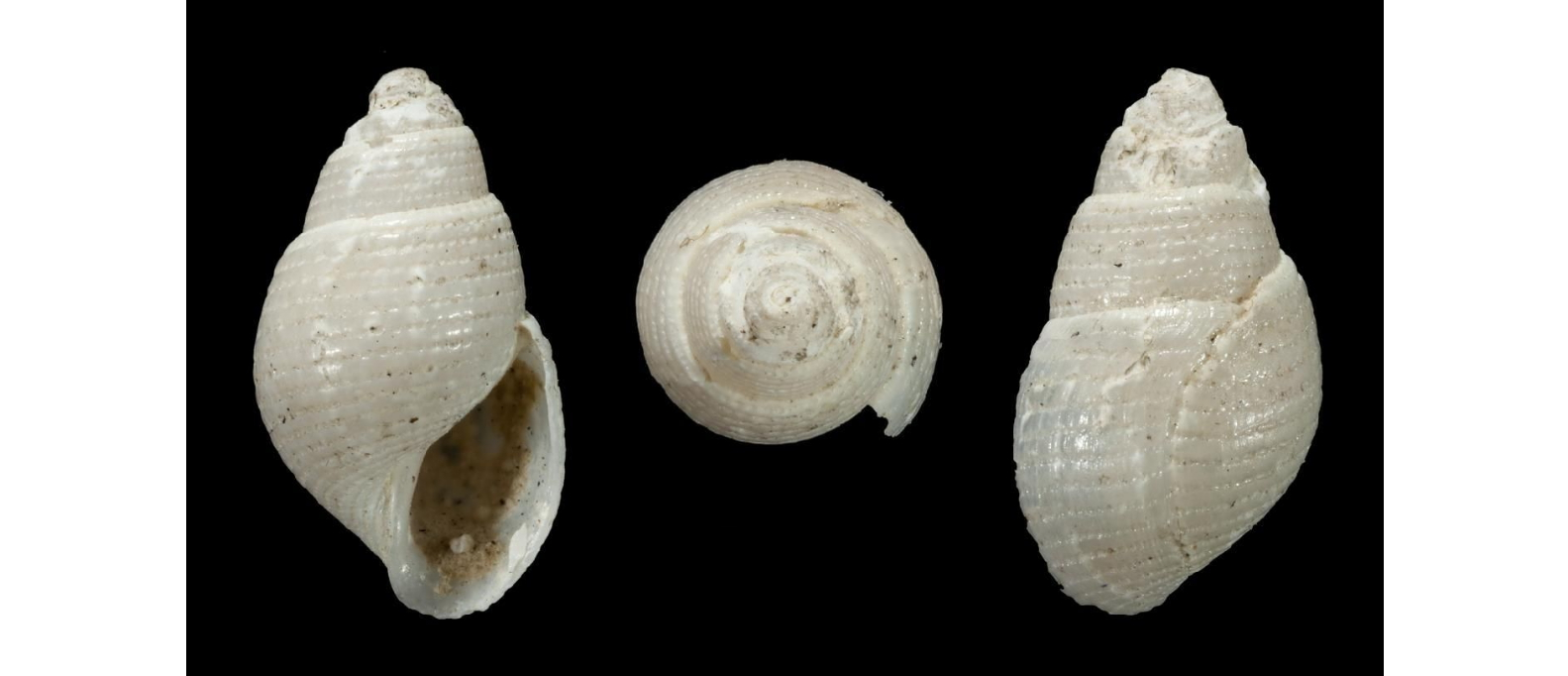
- Shell of Callostracon amabile

Scientific classification
- Kingdom: Animalia
- Phylum: Mollusca
- Class: Gastropoda
- Subterclass: Acteonimorpha
- Superfamily: Acteonoidea
- Family: Acteonidae
- Genus: Callostracon; Repetto & Bianco, 2012

Type species
- Colostracon tyrrhenicum Smriglio & Mariottini, 1996

Synonyms
- Callostracon sensu F. Nordsieck, 1972 (ncorrect subsequent spelling of Colostracon Hamlin, 1884; not an available name)

= Callostracon =

Genus of gastropods

Callostracon is a genus of small sea snails, predatory marine gastropod mollusks in the family Acteonidae, the barrel bubble snails.

== Nomenclature ==
When they described Callostracon tyrrhenicum, Smriglio & Mariottini combined the specific epithet with Callostracon as used by Nordsieck (1972). The latter, however, is a misspelling of Colostracon Hamlin, 1884, a genus of Mesozoic caenogastropods unrelated to the Recent Mediterranean species. Recognizing this situation, Repetto & Bianco established the name Callostracon for the Mediterranean species. Callostracon Repetto & Bianco, 2012, is not a junior homonym of "Callostracon" as used by Nordsieck, as the latter is an incorrect subsequent spelling, and thus not a nomenclaturally available name.

== Species ==
- Callostracon amabile (R. B. Watson, 1883)
- Callostracon chariis (R. B. Watson, 1883)
- Callostracon tyrrhenicum (Smriglio & Mariottini, 1996)
