= Maxacteon cratericulatus =

Scientific classification
- Kingdom: Animalia
- Phylum: Mollusca
- Class: Gastropoda
- Family: Acteonidae
- Genus: Maxacteon
- Species: M. cratericulatus

Binomial name
- Maxacteon cratericulatus (Hedley, 1906)

Synonyms
- Actaeon cratericulatus Hedley, 1906; Acteon (Maxacteon) cratericulatus (Hedley, 1906)

Species of gastropod

Maxacteon cratericulatus is a species of small sea snail, a predatory marine gastropod mollusc in the family Acteonidae, the barrel bubble snails.
