= Maxacteon =

Scientific classification
- Kingdom: Animalia
- Phylum: Mollusca
- Class: Gastropoda
- Family: Acteonidae
- Genus: Maxacteon; Rudman, 1971

Type species
- Maxacteon hancocki Rudman, 1971

Synonyms
- Acteon (Maxacteon) Rudman, 1971

Genus of gastropods

Maxacteon is a genus of small predatory sea snails, marine gastropod molluscs in the family Acteonidae, the barrel bubble snails.

== Species ==
Species within the genus Maxacteon include:

- Maxacteon cratericulatus Hedley, 1906
  - Distribution : New Zealand
- Maxacteon flammeus (= Acteon flammeus) Gmelin, 1791
- Maxacteon hancocki (= Acteon hancocki) Rudman, 1971
  - Distribution : New Zealand
  - Length : 6 mm
  - Description : headshield with a pair of fleshy lobes; thin operculum; white shell with orange-brown markings at the base and at the apex; large body whorl; large columella, slightly twisted; shell sculptured with grooves
- Maxacteon kawamurai (Habe, 1952)
- Maxacteon milleri (= Acteon milleri) Rudman, 1971
  - Distribution : New Zealand
- Maxacteon sagamiensis (Kuroda & Habe, 1971)

Species brought into synonymy

- Maxacteon fabreanus (= Acteon fabreanus) Crosse, 1874: synonym of Punctacteon fabreanus (Crosse, 1874)
