= Zardinellidae =

Scientific classification
- Kingdom: Animalia
- Phylum: Mollusca
- Class: Gastropoda
- Superfamily: Acteonoidea
- Family: †Zardinellidae; Bandel, 1994

Extinct family of gastropods

Zardinellidae is an extinct taxonomic family of fossil sea snails, marine gastropod mollusks in the superfamily Acteonoidea.
