= Neactaeonina =

Scientific classification
- Kingdom: Animalia
- Phylum: Mollusca
- Class: Gastropoda
- Family: Acteonidae
- Genus: Neactaeonina; Thiele, 1912)

Genus of gastropods

Neactaeonina is a genus of small sea snails, predatory marine gastropod molluscs in the family Acteonidae, the barrel bubble snails.

== Species ==
Species within the genus Neacteonina include:

- Neactaeonina argentina Zelaya, Schejter and Ituarte, 2011. Distribution: Southwestern Atlantic Ocean (coast of Argentina)
- Neactaeonina cingulata Strebel, 1908 - Distribution: subantarctic. Length: 10.5 mm. Description: found at depths of 50 to 350 m.
- Neactaeonina edentula Watson, 1883 - Distribution: subantarctic, Indian Ocean, Kerguelen Islands. Length: 49.6 mm. Description: found at depths of 170 to 800 m.
- Neactaeonina inexpectata Dell, 1956
- Neactaeonina umbilicalis
