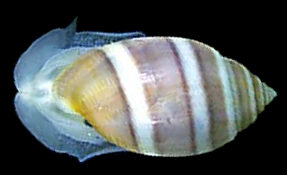
- dorsal view of a live Acteon tornatilis

Scientific classification
- Kingdom: Animalia
- Phylum: Mollusca
- Class: Gastropoda
- Family: Acteonidae
- Genus: Acteon
- Species: A. tornatilis

Binomial name
- Acteon tornatilis (Linnaeus, 1758)

Synonyms
- Actaeon tornatilis (Linnaeus, 1758); Acteon augustoi Nobre, 1932; Acteon candidulus Monterosato, 1923; Acteon semistriatus Glibert, 1952 (dubious synonym); Acteon subulatus Wood S., 1848; Acteon tornatilis var. ancilla Monterosato, 1917; Acteon tornatilis var. bullaeformis Jeffreys, 1867; Acteon tornatilis var. bulliaeformis Jeffreys, 1867; Bulla tornatilis Linnaeus, 1758 (original combination); Pseudactaeon luteofasciatus (Megerle von Mühlfeld, 1829); Tornatella fasciata Lamarck, 1816; Tornatella pellucida MacGillivray, 1843; Turbo ovalis da Costa, 1778; Voluta bifasciata Gmelin, 1791; Voluta luteofasciata Megerle von Mühlfeld, 1824 (dubious synonym); Voluta tornatilis Linnaeus, 1758

= Acteon tornatilis =

Species of gastropod

Acteon tornatilis, common name the "lathe acteon", is a species of medium-sized sea snail, a predatory marine gastropod mollusc in the family Acteonidae, the barrel bubble snails.

== Distribution ==
This sea snail is present in the Faroes, Shetland, Norway, British coasts, Atlantic coasts of France to the Mediterranean and Marmara Sea.

This is the major representative of the Acteonidae in European waters.

== Description ==
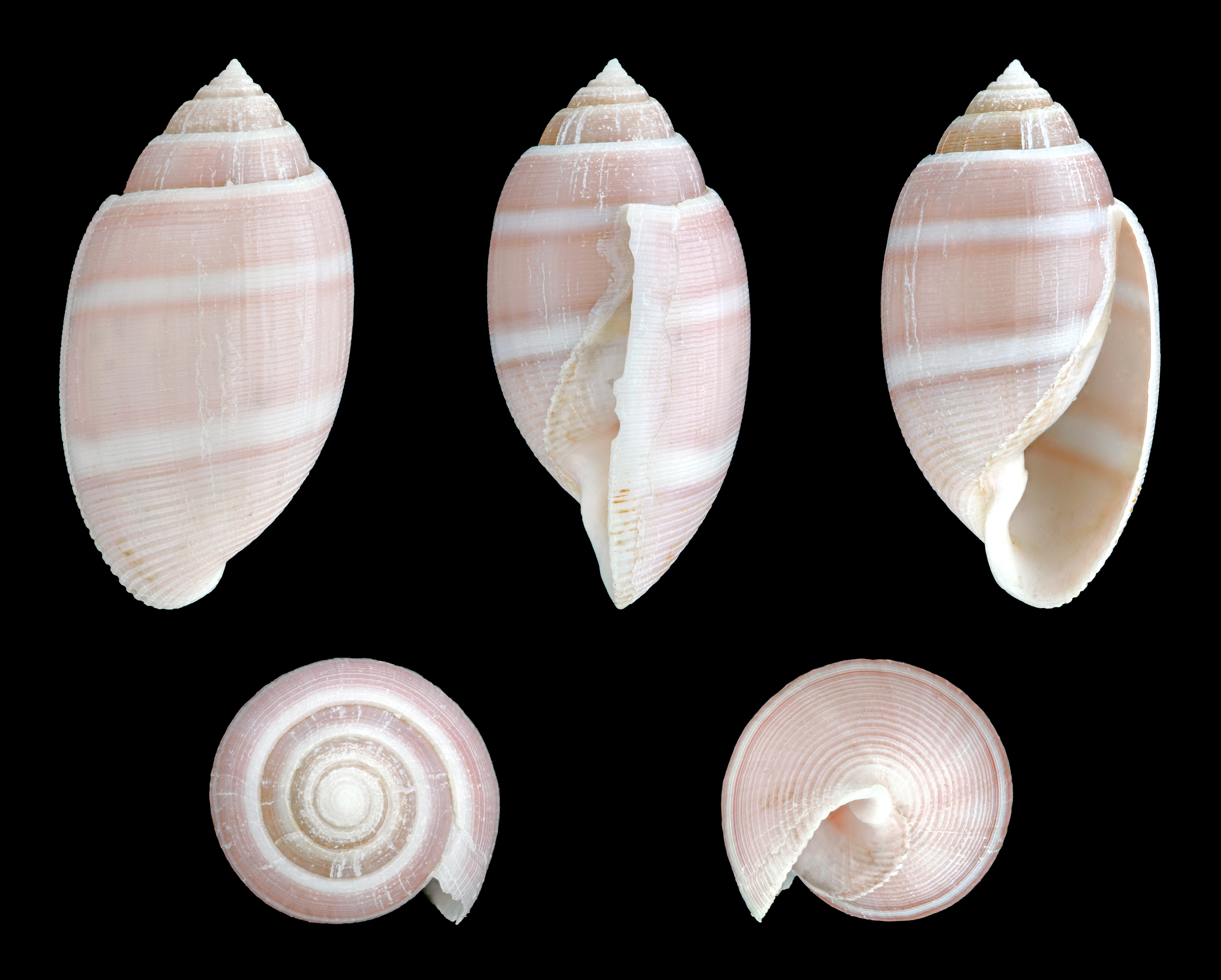
Acteon tornatilis shell.

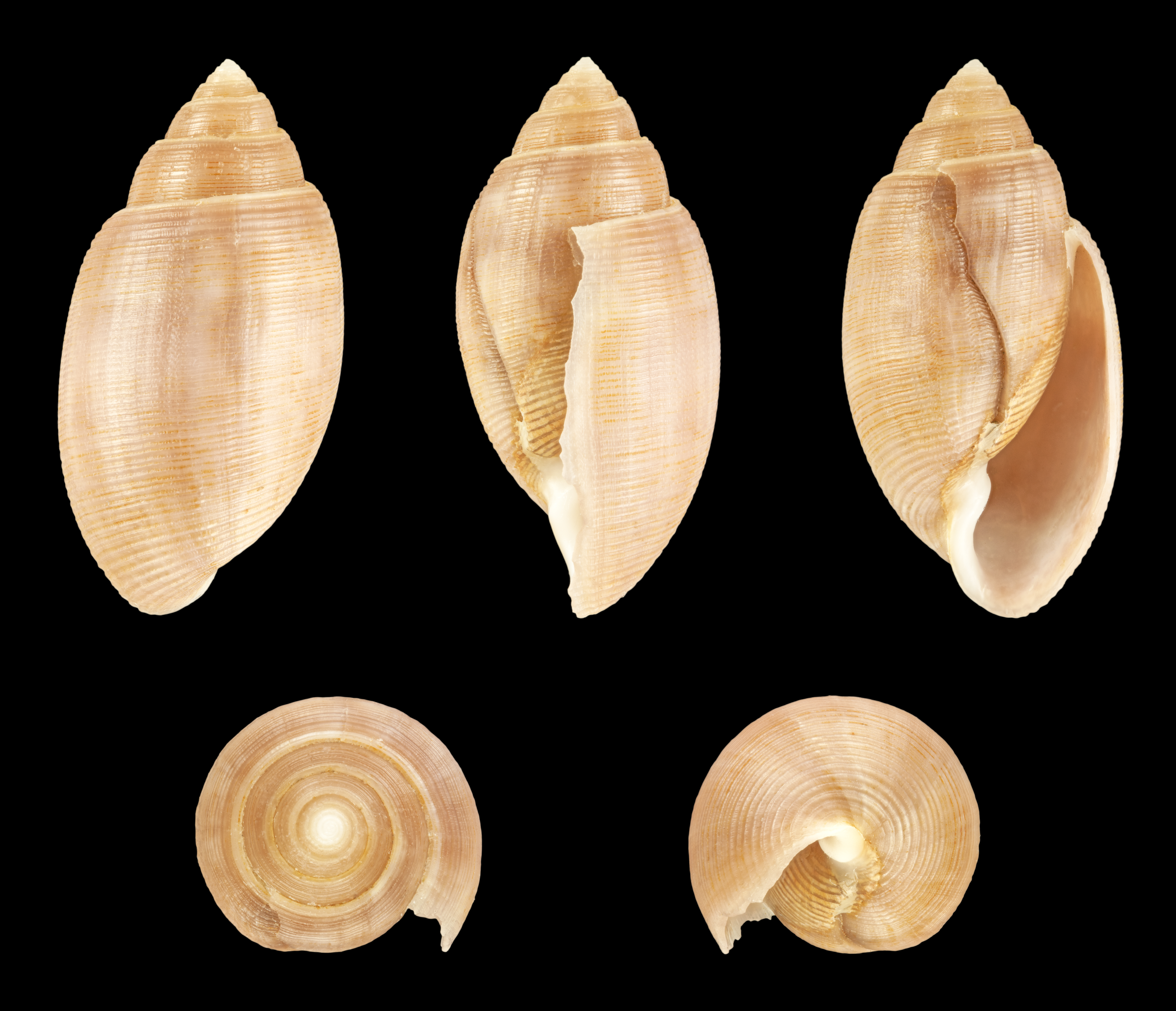
Acteon tornatilis f. unicolor shell.

Acteon tornatilis has a shell reaching a length of 10–25 millimetres (0.39–0.98 in). The body size reaches 30 millimetres (1.2 in). The basic colour of the shells is pink or pale brown with white bands. The shell is thick, glossy and ridged transversely, with 6–7 large whorls, filled with alternating wider light brown spiral bands and smaller pinkish stripes. The outer lip is white. The shell is elongate and ovate with a sharp apex. The aperture is narrow at the posterior notch but wider at the base. The columella is slightly thickened and twisted.

== Habitat ==
This species lives buried in the sand, in the intertidal zone and to a depth of up to 250 m.
