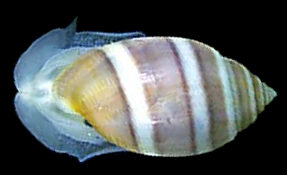
- dorsal view of a live Acteon tornatilis

Scientific classification
- Kingdom: Animalia
- Phylum: Mollusca
- Class: Gastropoda
- Superfamily: Acteonoidea
- Family: Acteonidae d'Orbigny, 1843

Type genus
- Acteon d'Orbigny, 1843

Synonyms
- Pupidae; Solidulidae; Tornatellidae

= Acteonidae =

Family of gastropods

Acteonidae, common name the "barrel bubble snails", is a family of small sea snails, marine gastropod mollusks of the informal group Lower Heterobranchia.

== Shell description ==
The shell is usually smaller than 25 mm. The shell of these sand-dwelling micromollusks is small, but it is large enough to house the retracted soft parts including the entire mantle.

The aperture is elongated. The narrow shell aperture, which is ovate and pointed on the top, can be closed with a corneous operculum.

The thick shell is oviform to fusiform, with a short (sometimes sunken) conical apex. They have spiral sculpturing. The elongated aperture opens up from narrow at the posterior notch to enlarged at the base. The base of the columella has several characteristic plaits.

== Anatomy ==
The radula has no central tooth, and there are five or six laterals on each side. The teeth are very similar in shape and size across the radula, which is specialised for a diet of polychaete worms.

The eggs are enclosed in a long, gelatinous mass, which is attached to the substrate with a short stalk.

The foot is with operculum.

== Ecology ==
Acteonidae occur in warm seas in shallow and deep water.

Animals predate polychaetes.

== Genera ==
Genera within the family Acteonidae include:

Genus Acteon Montfort, 1810 - type genus

† Genus Acteonina d'Orbigny, 1850

Genus Bathyacteon Valdés, 2008

Genus Callostracon Repetto & Bianco, 2012

† Genus Colostracon Hamlin, 1884

Genus Crenilabium Cossmann, 1889

Genus Inopinodon Bouchet, 1975

Genus Japonactaeon Taki, 1956

Genus Lanayrella Salvador & C. Cunha, 2020

Genus Liocarenus Harris & Burrows, 1891

- Liocarenus globulinus Forbes, 1844
  - Distribution : Atlantic, Mediterranean

Genus Lissacteon Monterosato, 1890

Genus Maxacteon Rudman, 1971

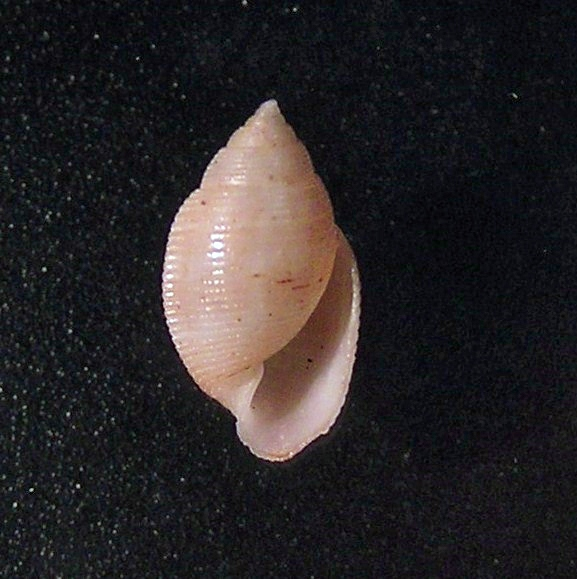
shell of Maxacteon fabreanus

Genus Mysouffa Marcus, 1974

- Mysouffa cumingii (= Acteon mysouffa cumingii) (A. Adams, 1855)
  - Distribution : Florida, Brazil
  - Length : 20 mm
- Mysouffa turrita (Watson, 1883)
  - Distribution : Jamaica, Cuba, Caribbean
  - Length : 14 mm
  - Description : found at depths of around 700 m

Genus Neactaeonina Thiele, 1912

Genus Obrussena Iredale, 1930

- Obrussena bracteata Iredale, 1930
  - Distribution : Australia
- Obrussena moeshimaensis T. Habe, 1952
  - Distribution : Japan

Genus Ongleya Finlay & Marwick, 1937

Genus Ovulacteon Dall, 1889

- Ovulacteon meekii Dall, 1889
  - Distribution : Cuba, Bahamas, East Brazil
  - Length : 5.5 mm
  - Description : found at depths of 360 to 820 m

Genus Pseudactaeon Thiele, 1925.

- Pseudactaeon albus Sowerby III, 1873
  - Distribution : South Africa
- Pseudactaeon pusillus Forbes, 1844
  - Distribution : Florida, North Atlantic, Mediterranean
  - Length : 11 mm
- Pseudactaeon tenellus Loven, 1846
- Pseudactaeon luteofasciatus (Mühlfeldt, 1829): synonym of Acteon tornatilis (Linnaeus, 1758)

Genus Punctacteon Kuroda & Habe, 1961

- Punctacteon amakusaensis T. Habe, 1949
  - Distribution : Indo-Pacific
- Punctacteon cebuanus Lan, 1985
  - Distribution : Philippines
- Punctacteon eloisae Abbott, 1973 Eloise’s acteon
  - Distribution : Red Sea, Oman.
  - Length : 25–38 mm
  - Description: sublittoral on sandy bottoms; cream-colored shell with 5 convex whorls, each whorl with many spiral windings; each whorl is filled with red-brown separate patterns with dark brown to black borders; similar to Maxacteon flammea.
- Punctacteon fabreanus (H. Crosse, 1874)
  - Distribution : Philippines
  - Length : 17–30 mm
  - Description : white shell with five whorls, each whorl filled with light brown bands covering the many spirals of each whorl.
- Punctacteon kajiyamai T. Habe, 1976
  - Distribution : Indo-Pacific
- Punctacteon kawamurai T. Habe, 1952
  - Distribution : Japan
- Punctacteon kirai T. Habe, 1949
  - Distribution : Indo-Pacific off the Philippines
  - Length : 20 mm
  - Description : shell whitish to brownish; five whorls, first whorl being the largest; each whorl has many spiral windings; outer lip is notched.
- Punctacteon variegatus (synonym: Acteon variegatus) Bruguière, 1789 Pink-spotted acteon
  - Distribution : Philippines, West Australia.
  - Length : 9–27 mm
  - Description : sublittoral on sandy bottoms; convex, cream-colored shell with five whorls, each whorls is covered with transverse pink-colored to light brown patterns, without dark borders; whirls with prominent shoulder.

Genus Pupa Röding, 1798:

Genus Rapturella Salvador & C. Cunha, 2016

Genus Rictaxis Dall, 1871:

Genus Tenuiacteon Aldrich, 1921

- Tenuiacteon ambiguus Hutton, 1885

Genus Tomlinula Strand, 1932

- Tomlinula turrita Watson, 1886

† Genus Volvaria Lamarck, 1801

Genera brought into synonymy

- Actaeon Ersch & Gruber, 1818: synonym of Acteon Montfort, 1810
- † Actaeonidea Gabb, 1872: synonym of Rictaxis Dall, 1871
- Buccinulus H. Adams & A. Adams, 1854: synonym of Pupa Röding, 1798
- Callostracon sensu Nordsieck, 1972: synonym of † Colostracon Hamlin, 1884
- Crenilabrum Kobelt, 1892: synonym of Crenilabium Cossmann, 1889
- Dactylus Schumacher, 1817: synonym of Pupa Röding, 1798
- Japonacteon [sic]: synonym of Japonactaeon Taki, 1956
- Lissactaeon Monterosato, 1890: synonym of Crenilabium Cossmann, 1889
- Neoacteonina [sic] : synonym of Neactaeonina Thiele, 1912
- Obrussa Iredale, 1925: synonym of Obrussena Iredale, 1930
- Solidula Fischer von Waldheim, 1807: synonym of Pupa Röding, 1798
- Strigopupa Habe, 1958: synonym of Pupa Röding, 1798
- Tornatella Lamarck, 1816: synonym of Acteon Montfort, 1810
