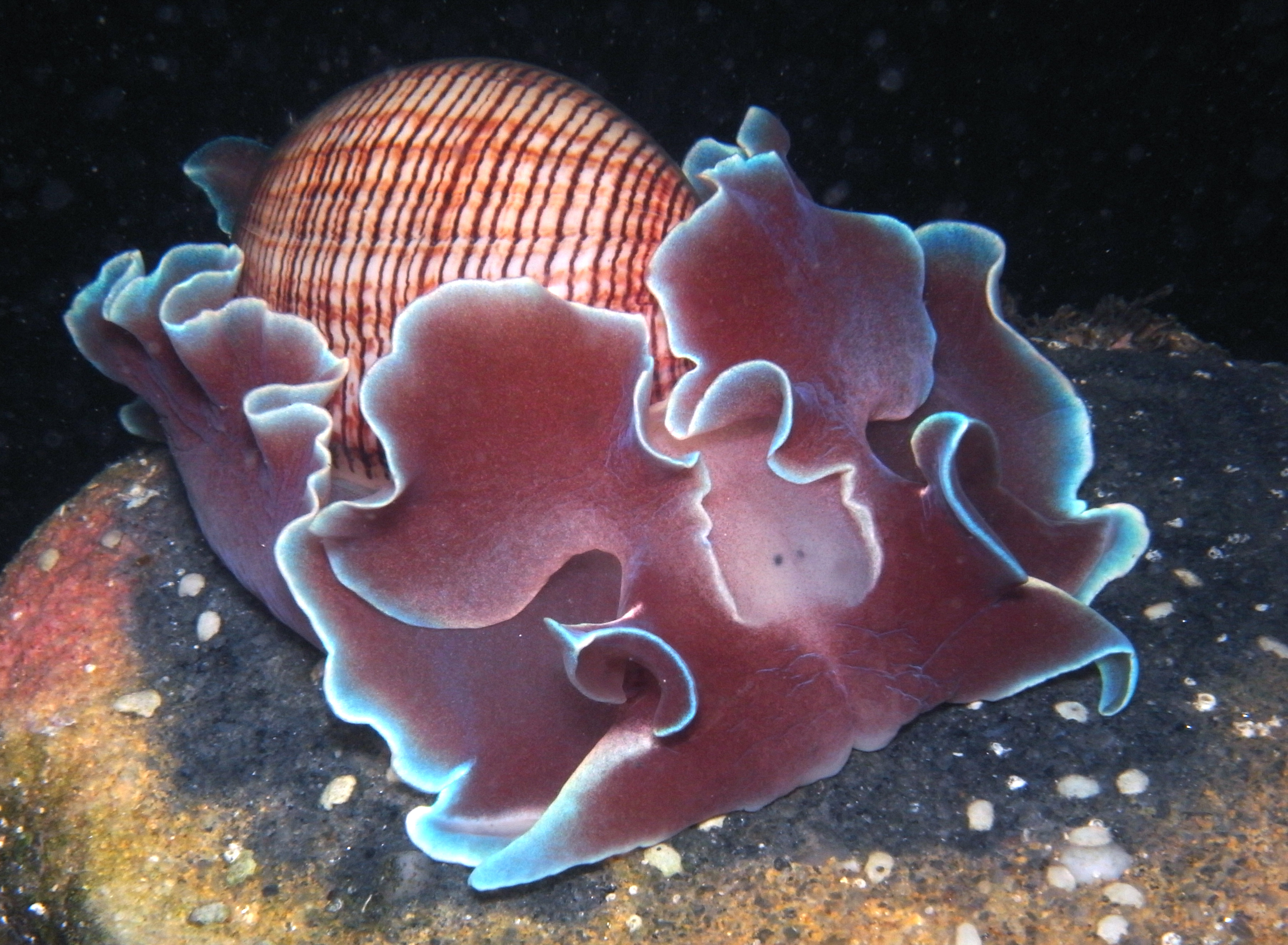
- Live Hydatina physis

Scientific classification
- Kingdom: Animalia
- Phylum: Mollusca
- Class: Gastropoda
- Subterclass: Acteonimorpha
- Superfamily: Acteonoidea d'Orbigny, 1843

Diversity
- about 150 species

= Acteonoidea =

Superfamily of gastropods

Acteonoidea is a superfamily of sea snails, or bubble snails, marine gastropod mollusks.

== Taxonomy ==
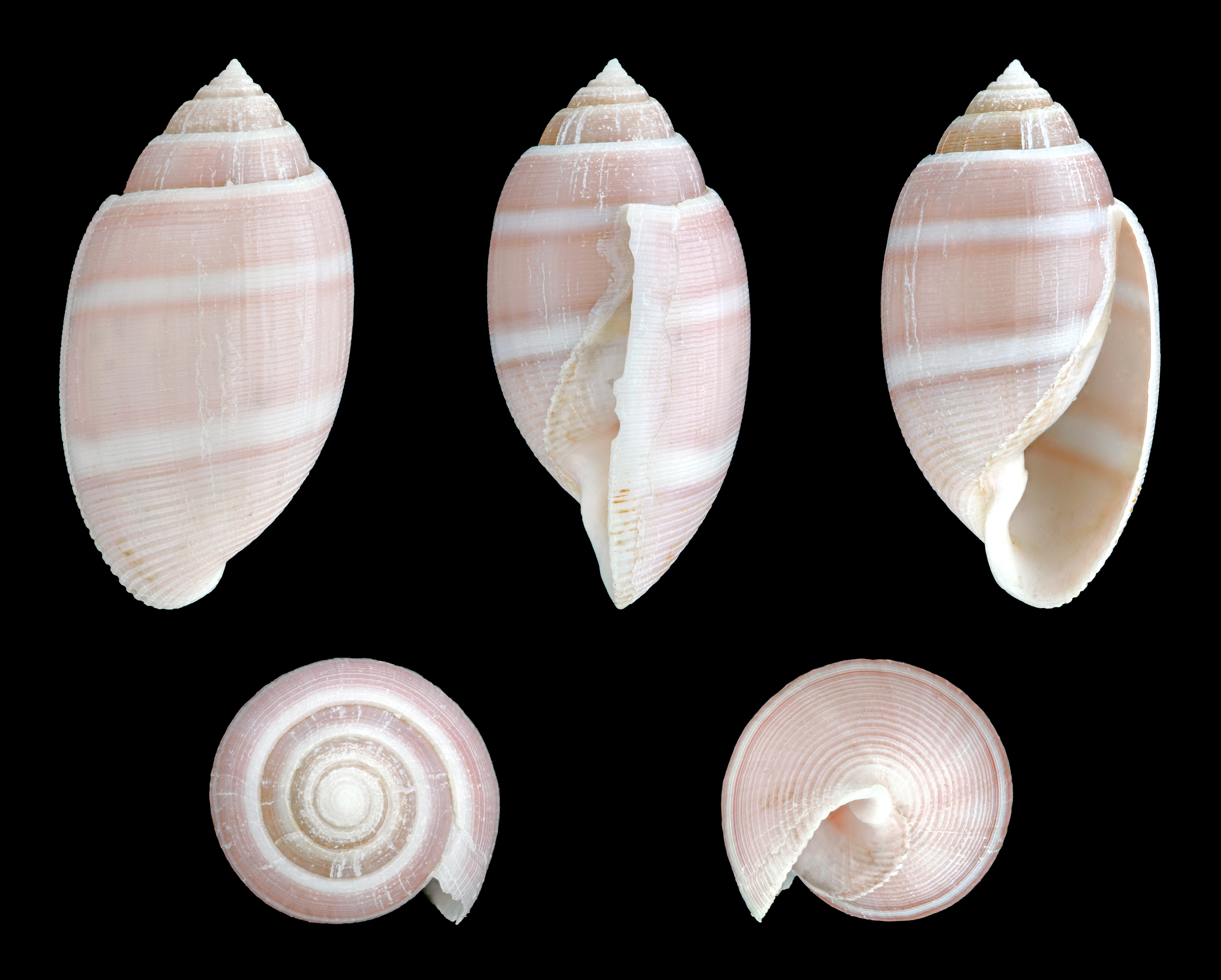
Acteon tornatilis shell.

In the taxonomy of Bouchet & Rocroi (2005), the superfamily Acteonoidea has been included into the informal group "Lower Heterobranchia" (Heterostropha sensu Ponder & Warén, 1988), also known as the Allogastropoda.

Only one of analyses by Jörger et al. (2010) indicates the Acteonoidea sister to Nudipleura. This clade that had resulted repeatedly in molecular studies with still limited "lower heterobranch" taxon sampling, either in a derived position or as a basal offshoot within Euthyneura. A recent molecular phylogeny on Acteonoidea suggest a common origin with lower heterobranch Rissoelloidea and a sister group relationship to Nudipleura. While the basal position of Acteonoidea was commonly accepted, some authors doubted the basal position of Nudipleura, which was originally considered as a highly derived taxon, and suspect rate heterogeneity and deviant base composition as causing this unnatural grouping. Based on potential synapomorphies in the reproductive system (presence of a ciliary stripe within the ampulla, androdiaulic or triaulic pallial gonoduct), Ghiselin already suggested a relationship between Acteonoidea and Nudipleura. However, Acteonoidea form a well-supported "lower heterobranch" clade with Rissoelloidea, confirming results by Aktipis et al. and Dinapoli and Klussmann-Kolb. The latter authors also recovered Nudipleura as the first offshoot of Euthyneura, which is confirmed by Jörger et al. (2010) study. Salvini-Plawen and Steiner grouped Umbraculoidea with Nudipleura, but none of the recent molecular or morphological studies support such a relationship.

== Families ==
The following five families have been recognized in the taxonomy of Bouchet & Rocroi (2005):

- family Acteonidae d' Orbigny, 1843
- † family Acteonellidae Gill, 1871
- family Aplustridae Gray, 1847 - former name Hydatinidae has been declared invalid
- family Bullinidae Gray, 1850
- † family Zardinellidae Bandel, 1994

== Description ==
All acteonoids have a shell that resembles that of many prosobranchs. Some of the members are able to withdraw completely into the shell and to close the shell with an operculum, e.g. Acteon tornatilis.

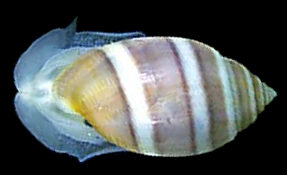
Acteon tornatilis

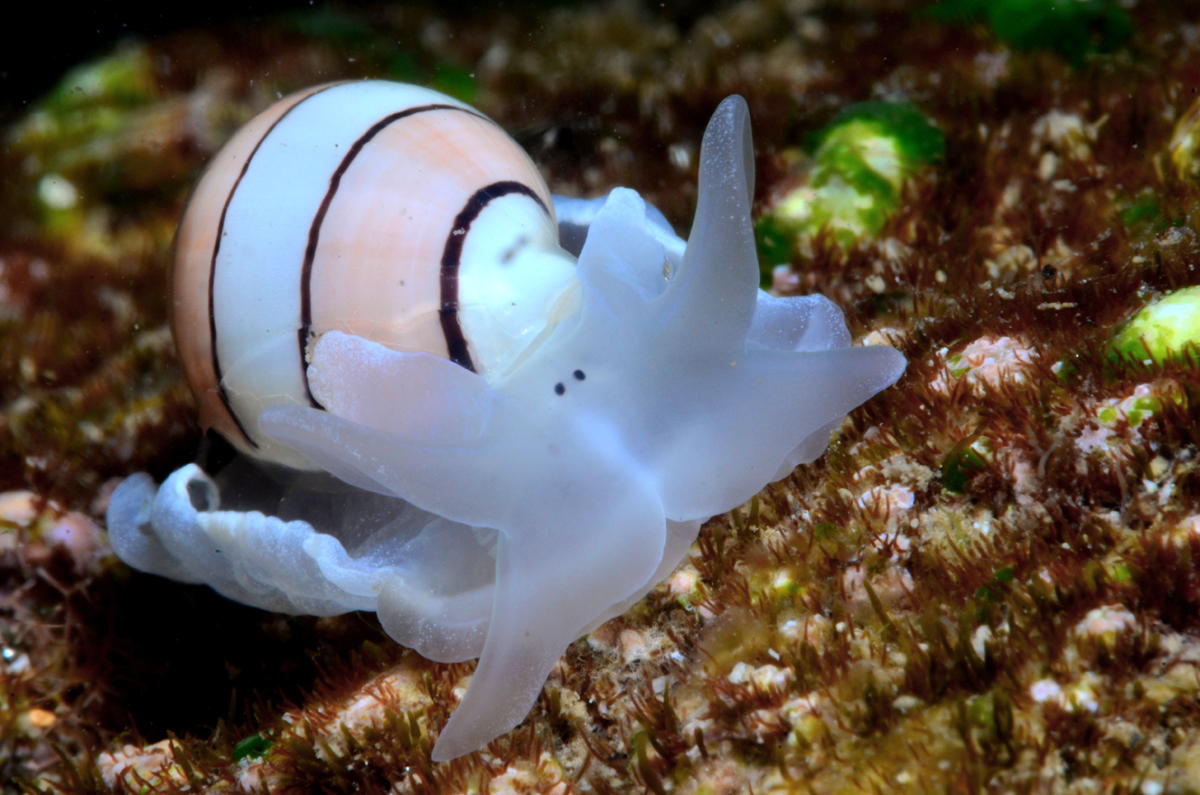
Aplustrum amplustre

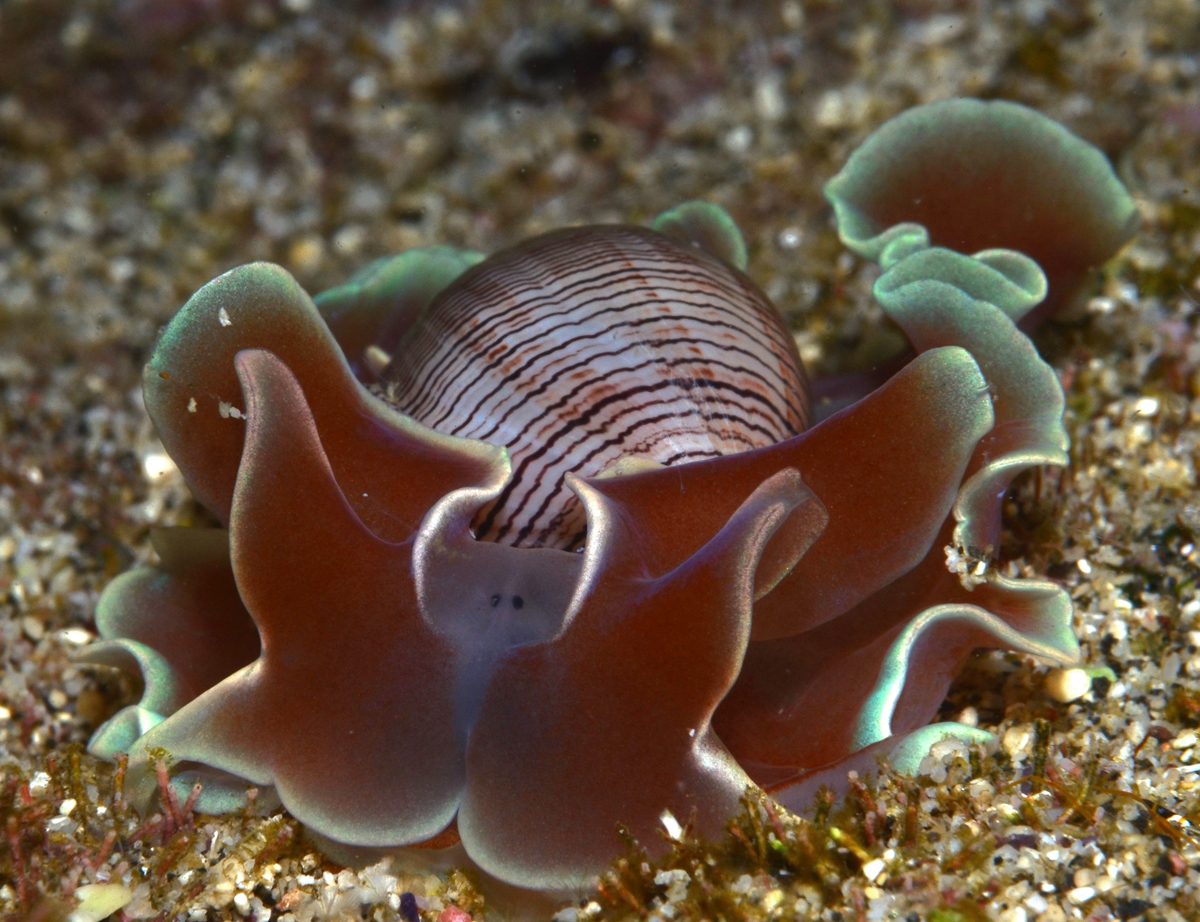
Hydatina physis

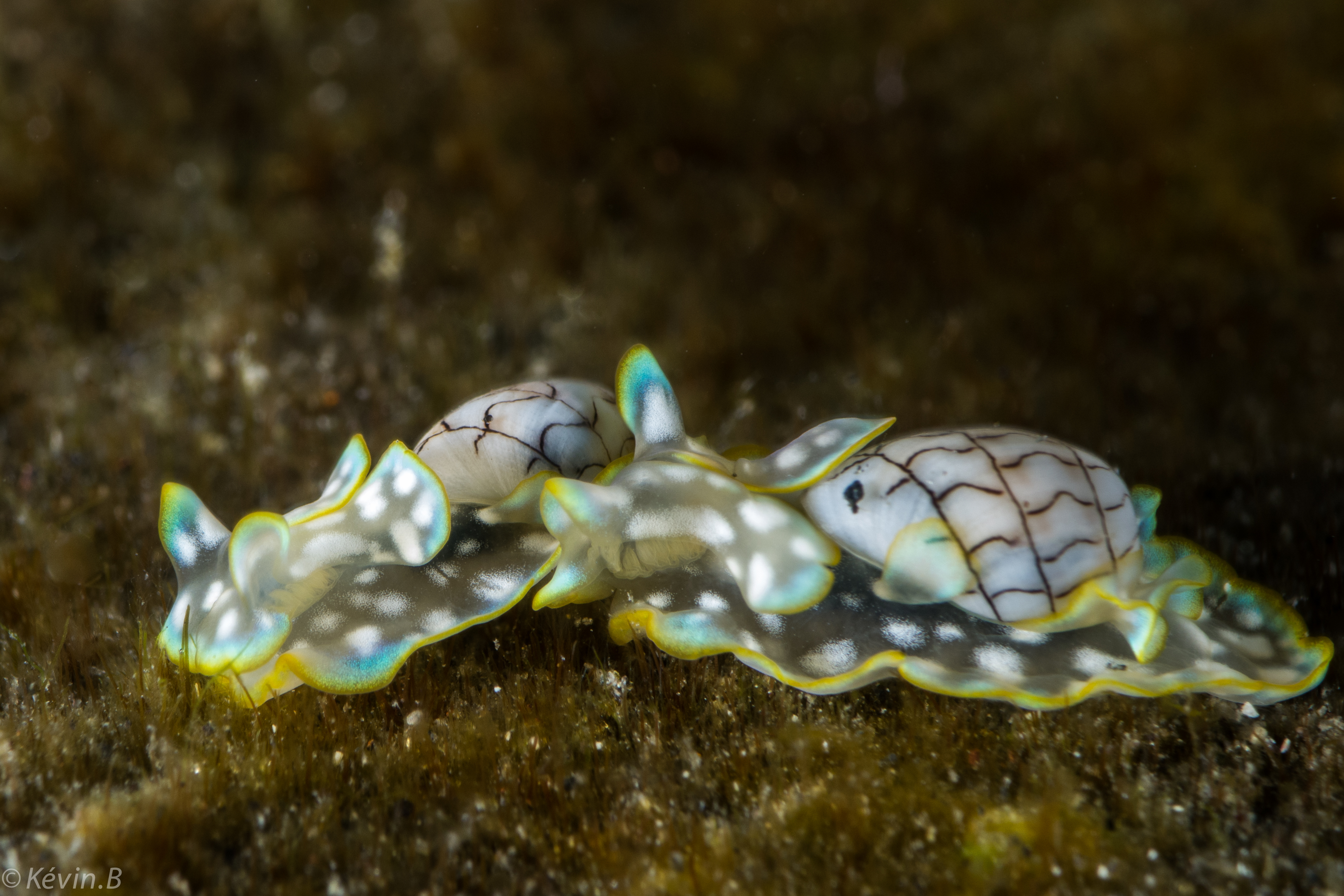
Micromelo undatus

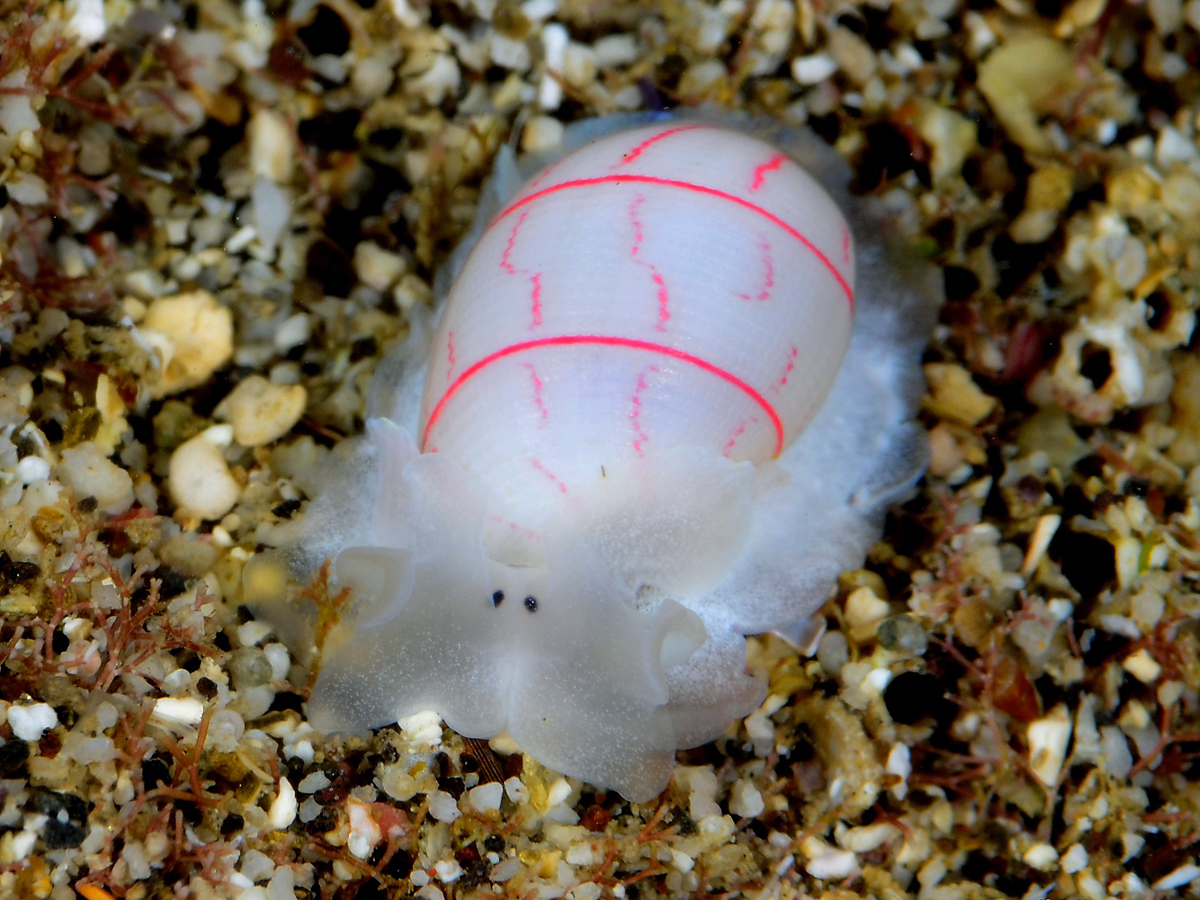
Bullina lineata

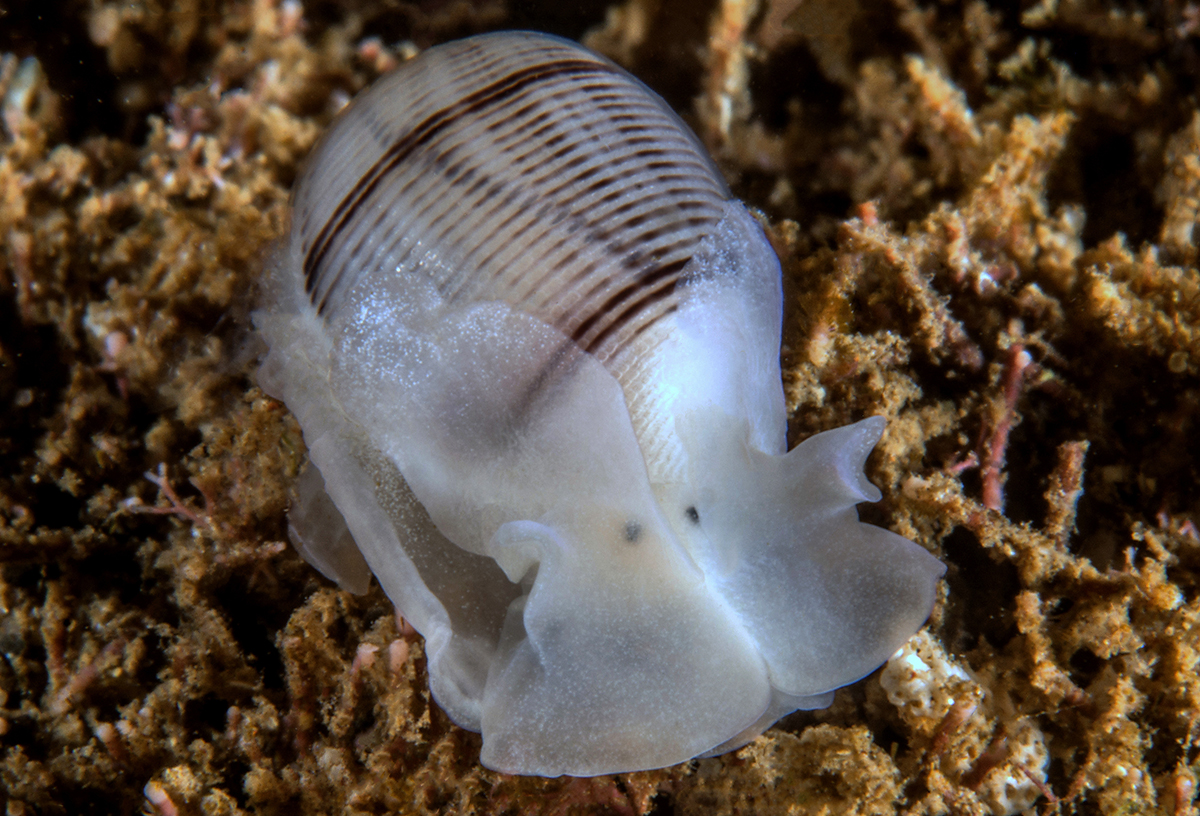
Bullina vitrea.

== Anatomy ==
No defensive strategies are known from these animals although histological investigations show a highly glandular area in the mantle cavity and the mantle rim. The mantle rim glands, for example, are very conspicuous. These comprise large epithelial cells that are filled with a non-staining vacuole. The glandular area is highly folded. The cells appear to lie subepithelially due to their size. They alternate with small ciliated cells. The hypobranchial gland in the roof of the mantle cavity is small and consists of violet-staining epithelial cells indicating acid mucopolysaccharides.

== Feeding habits ==
Acteonidae and Aplustridae are carnivorous and mainly feed on polychaetes.
