= List of the Mesozoic life of Tennessee =

This list of the Mesozoic life of Tennessee contains the various prehistoric life-forms whose fossilized remains have been reported from within the US state of Tennessee and are between 252.17 and 66 million years of age.

== A ==
- †Aciculiscala
  - †Aciculiscala acuta
- Acirsa
  - †Acirsa americana – type locality for species
  - †Acirsa cerithiformis
  - †Acirsa corrugata
  - †Acirsa cretacea
  - †Acirsa microstriata
  - †Acirsa wadei
- Acmaea
  - †Acmaea galea
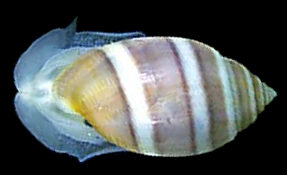
- A living Acteon barrel bubble sea snail
  †Acteon
  - †Acteon conicus – type locality for species
  - †Acteon ellipticus – type locality for species
  - †Acteon modicellus
  - †Acteon pistilliformis
  - †Acteon substriatus – type locality for species
- †Acteonina
  - †Acteonina orientalis – type locality for species
  - †Acteonina parva – type locality for species
- †Acutostrea
  - †Acutostrea plumosa
- †Aenona
  - †Aenona eufalensis
- Alderina
  - †Alderina nelsoni – type locality for species
- †Amaurellina
  - †Amaurellina stephensoni
- Amauropsis
  - †Amauropsis lirata – type locality for species
- †Ambigostrea
  - †Ambigostrea tecticosta
- Ammatophora
  - †Ammatophora cretacea – type locality for species
- Amphiblestrum
  - †Amphiblestrum denticulatum – type locality for species
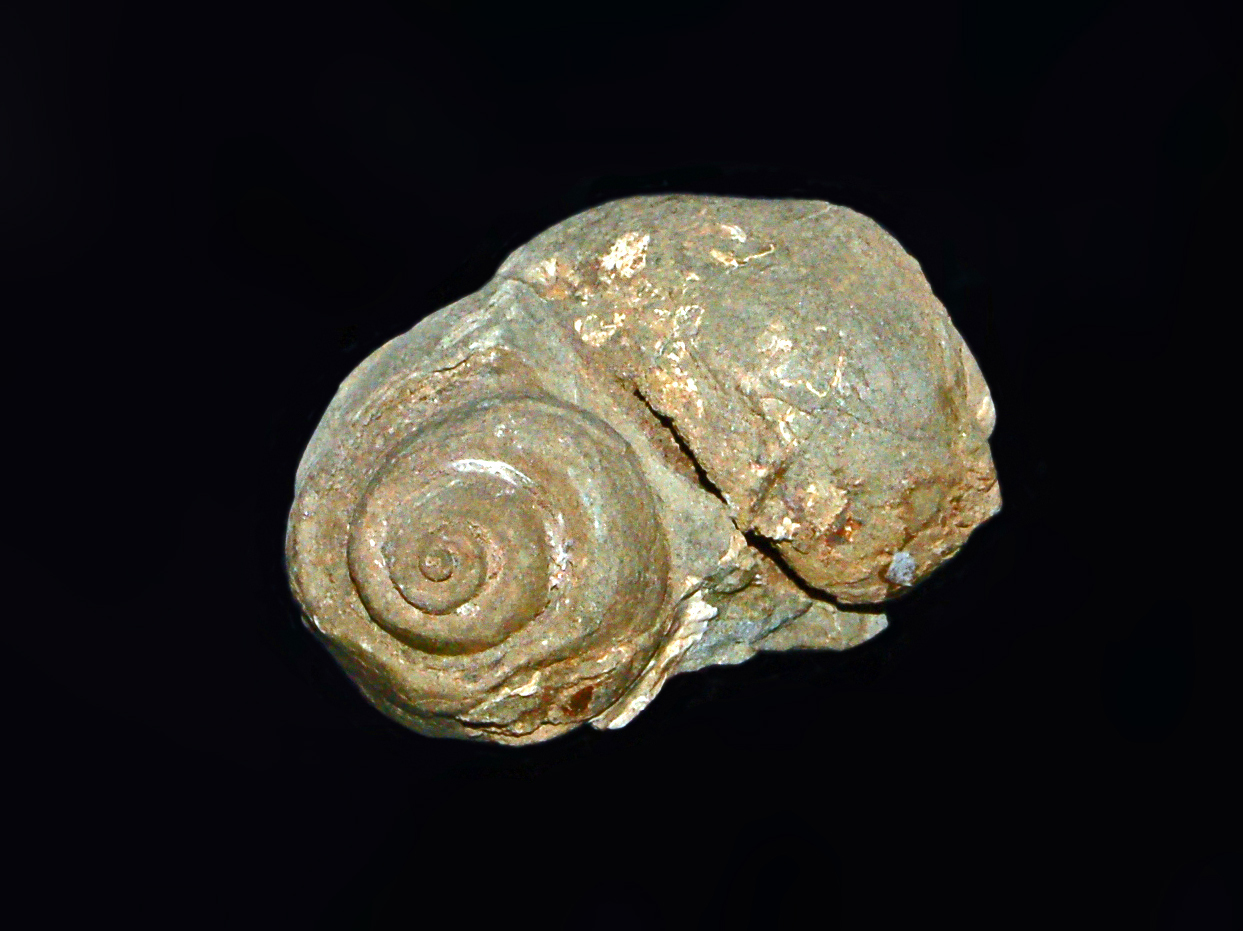
- Fossilized shell of the Jurassic-Miocene sea snail Ampullina
  †Ampullina
  - †Ampullina lirata
  - †Ampullina potens – type locality for species
  - †Ampullina umbilica
- Amuletum
  - †Amuletum fasciolatum
  - †Amuletum macnairyensis
- †Anatimya
  - †Anatimya lata
- †Anchura
  - †Anchura calcaris – type locality for species
  - †Anchura convexa – type locality for species
  - †Anchura noakensis – tentative report
  - †Anchura pergracilis
  - †Anchura quadrilirata – type locality for species
  - †Anchura substriata – type locality for species
- †Ancilla
  - †Ancilla acutula
- †Anomalofusus
  - †Anomalofusus substriatus
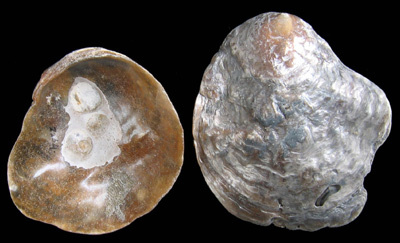
- Interior and exterior of a shell of an Anomia, or jingle shell
  †Anomia
  - †Anomia argentaria
  - †Anomia perlineata – type locality for species
  - †Anomia tellinoides
- †Anomoeodus
- Anteglosia
  - †Anteglosia subornata
  - †Anteglosia tennesseensis
- †Aphrodina
  - †Aphrodina tippana
- †Arca
  - †Arca mcnairyensis – type locality for species
  - †Arca pergracilis – type locality for species
  - †Arca securiculata – type locality for species
- Arctica
  - †Arctica incerta – type locality for species
- †Aspidolithus
  - †Aspidolithus parcus
- †Astandes
  - †Astandes densatus
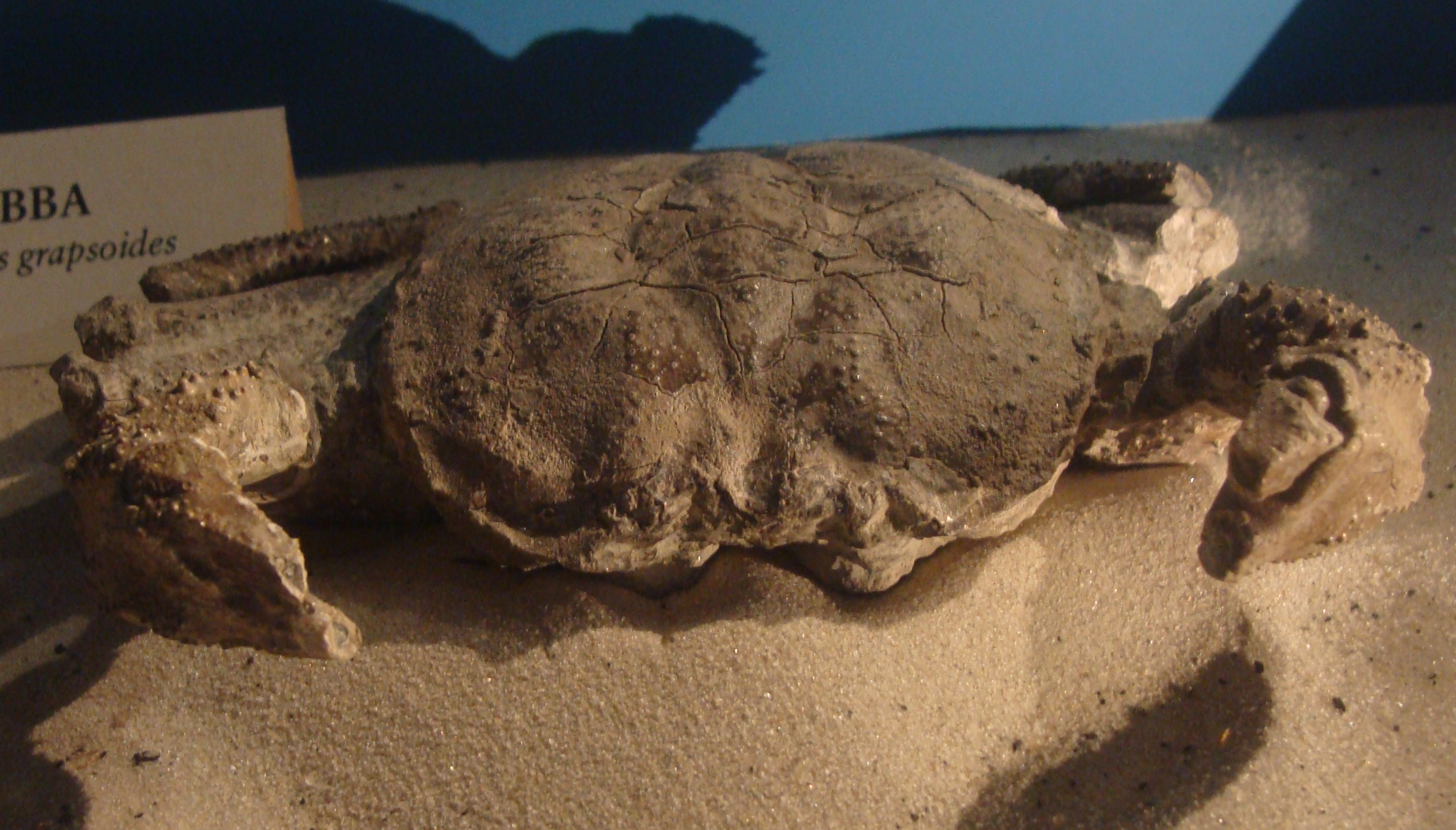
- Fossil of the Late Cretaceous crab Avitelmessus
  †Avitelmessus
  - †Avitelmessus grapsoideus

== B ==
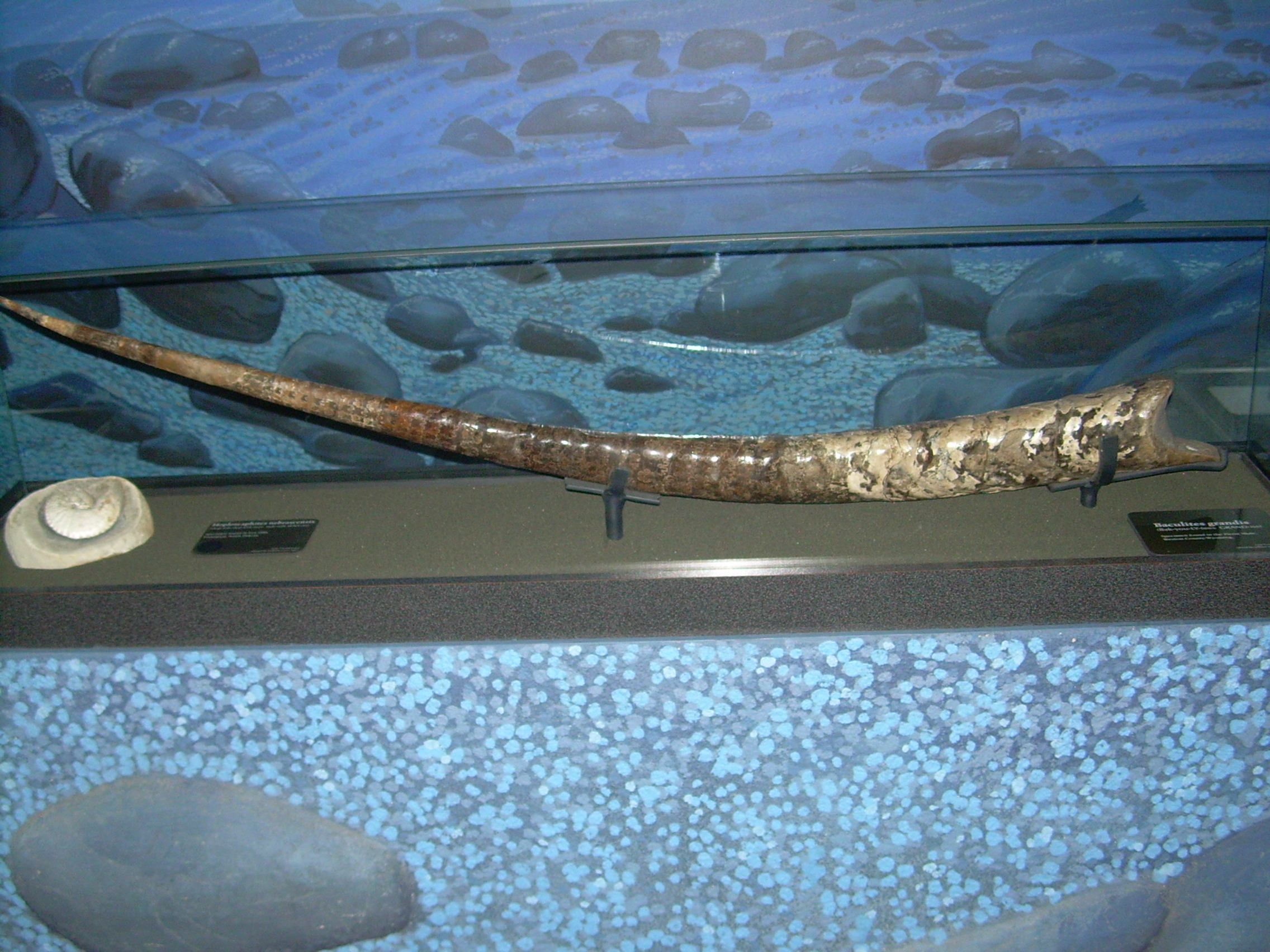
- Fossilized shell of the Late Cretaceous ammonoid cephalopod Baculites
  †Baculites
  - †Baculites grandis
  - †Baculites ovatus
- Barbatia
  - †Barbatia cochlearis – type locality for species
  - †Barbatia fractura – type locality for species
  - †Barbatia saffordi
- †Bellifusus
  - †Bellifusus angulicostatus
  - †Bellifusus curvicostatus
  - †Bellifusus spinosus
- †Belliscala – or unidentified comparable form
  - †Belliscala rockensis
- Berenicea
- †Beretra
  - †Beretra gracilis
  - †Beretra ripleyana
  - †Beretra speciosa
- †Bizarrus
  - †Bizarrus abnormalis – type locality for species
- †Boltenella
  - †Boltenella excellens
- Brachidontes
- †Buccinopsis
  - †Buccinopsis crassa
  - †Buccinopsis crassicostata
  - †Buccinopsis solida

== C ==
- Cadulus
  - †Cadulus obnutus
- Caestocorbula
  - †Caestocorbula crassiplica
- Callianassa
  - †Callianassa mortoni
- †Calliomphalus
  - †Calliomphalus americanus – type locality for species
  - †Calliomphalus angustus
  - †Calliomphalus argenteus – type locality for species
  - †Calliomphalus argenteus spinosus
  - †Calliomphalus conanti
  - †Calliomphalus decoris
- Callopora
  - †Callopora anatina – type locality for species
  - †Callopora sulcata – type locality for species
  - †Callopora torquata – type locality for species
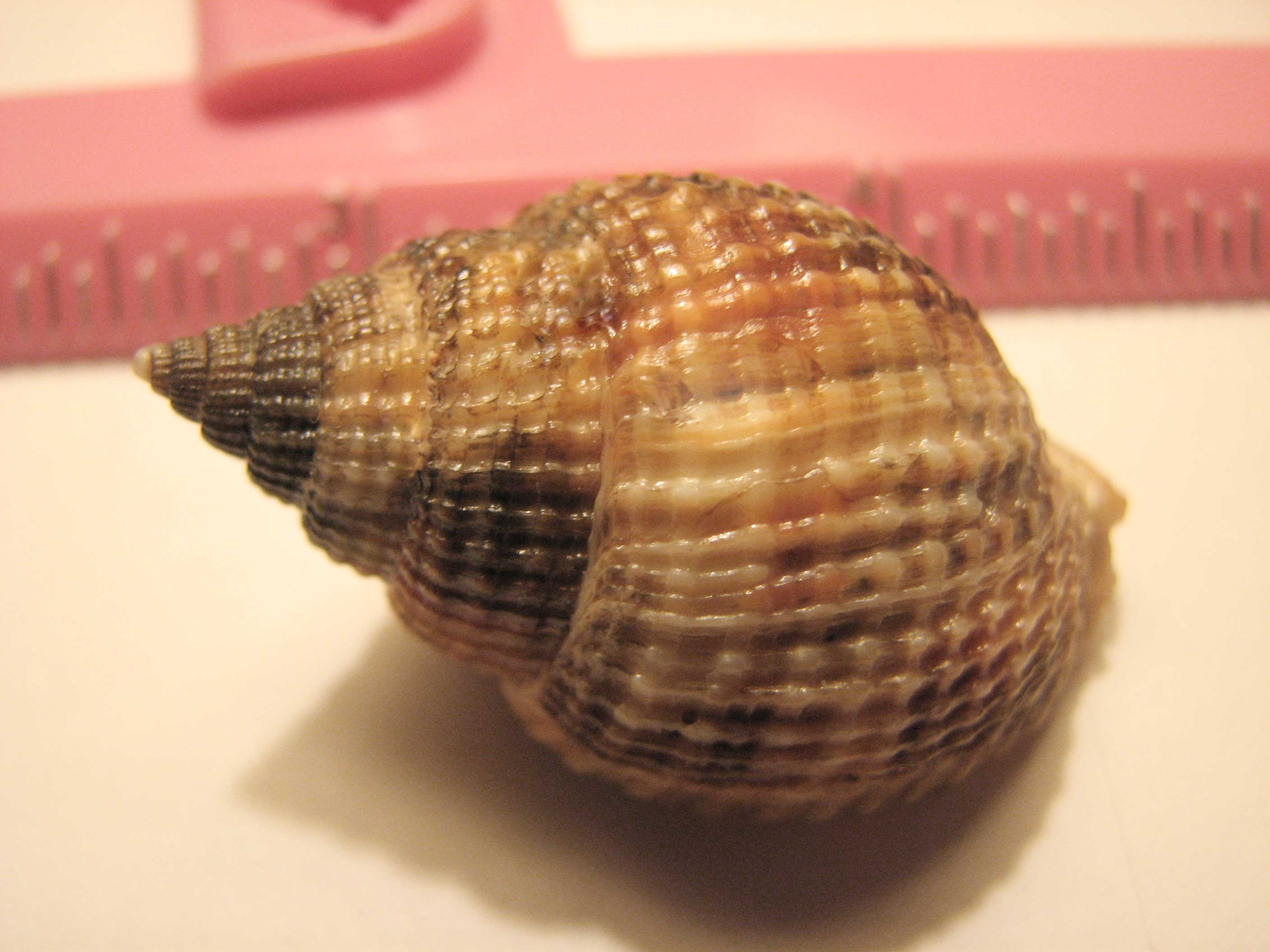
- Shell of a Cancellaria nutmeg sea snail
  Cancellaria
  - †Cancellaria acuta – type locality for species
  - †Cancellaria macnairyensis
- †Caprinella
  - †Caprinella coraloidea
- Capulus
  - †Capulus corrugatus – type locality for species
  - †Capulus monroei
- Cardium
  - †Cardium kuemmeli
  - †Cardium stantoni – type locality for species
- †Caveola
  - †Caveola acuta
- Cerithiopsis
  - †Cerithiopsis meeki – type locality for species
  - †Cerithiopsis quadrilirata – type locality for species
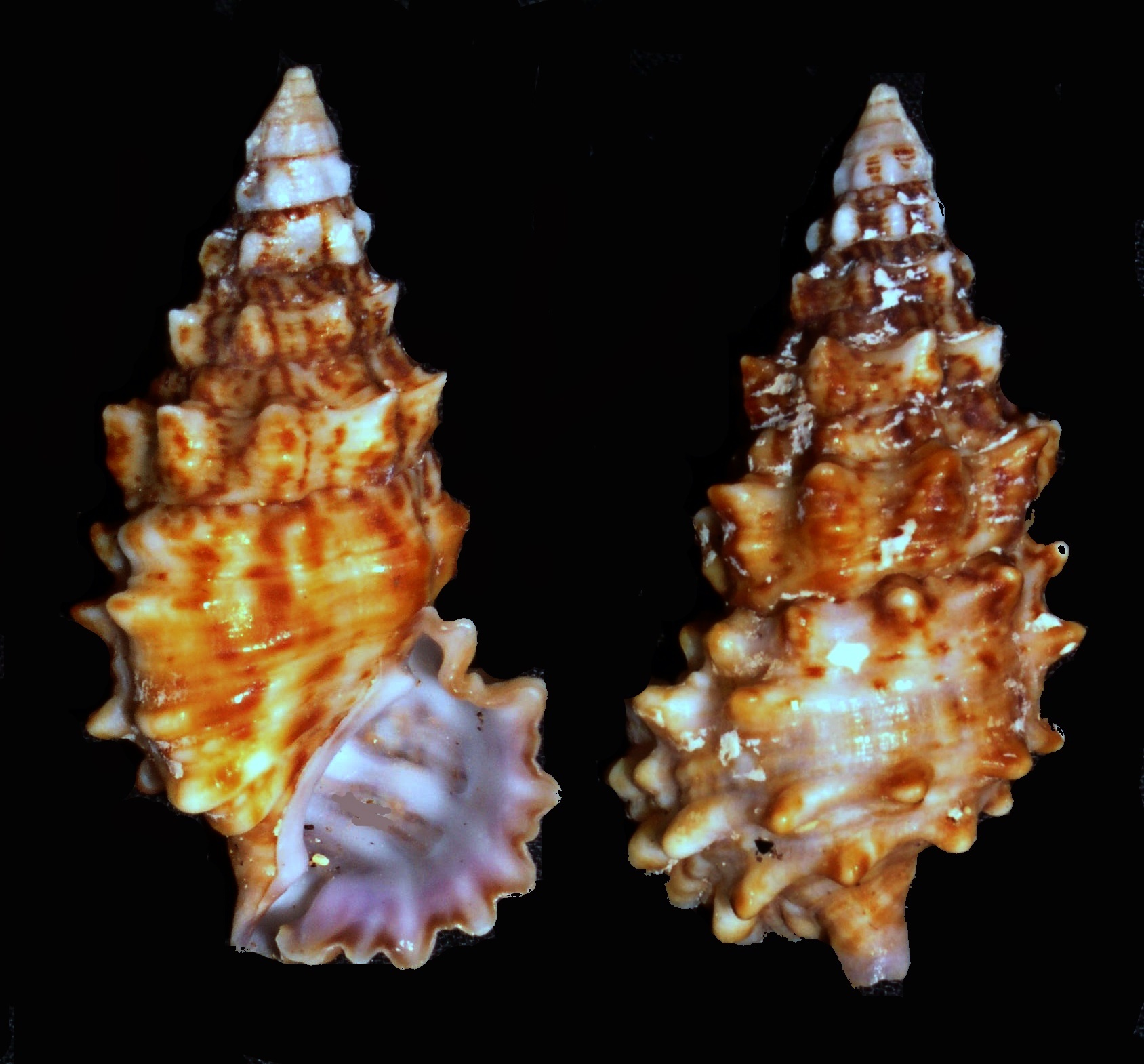
- Two views of a Cerithium cerith sea snail
  Cerithium
  - †Cerithium nodoliratum – type locality for species
  - †Cerithium percostatum – type locality for species
  - †Cerithium semirugatum – type locality for species
  - †Cerithium weeksi – type locality for species
- Charonia
  - †Charonia univaricosum – type locality for species
- Chiton
  - †Chiton cretaceous
- †Cinulia
  - †Cinulia paraquensis – type locality for species
- Clavagella
  - †Clavagella armata
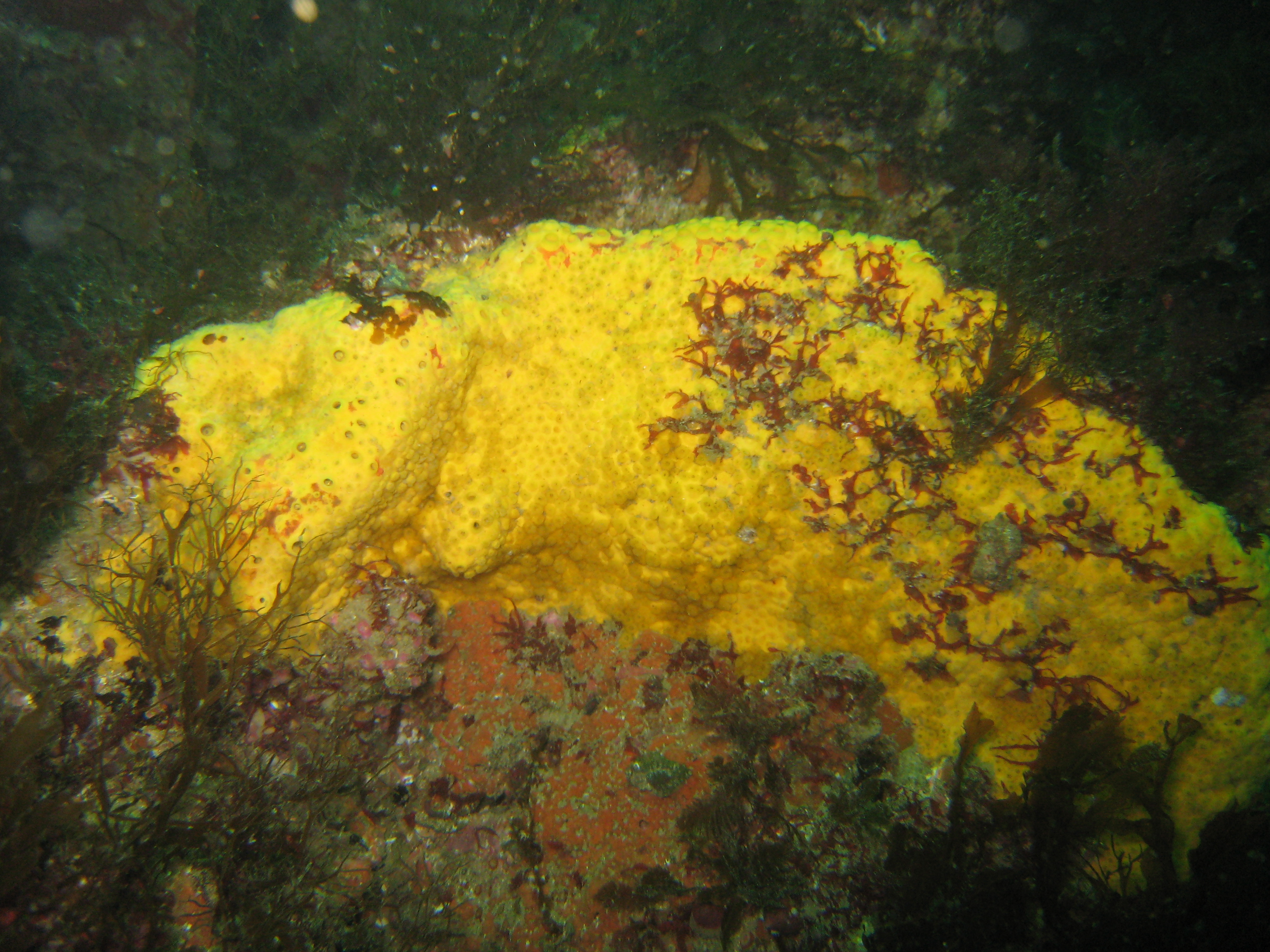
- A living Cliona sponge
  Cliona
- †Colombellina
  - †Colombellina americana – type locality for species
- Conopeum
  - †Conopeum ovatum – type locality for species
  - †Conopeum parviporum – type locality for species
  - †Conopeum prismaticum – type locality for species
  - †Conopeum wadei – type locality for species
- †Conorbis
  - †Conorbis mcnairyensis
- Corbula
  - †Corbula paracrassa – type locality for species
  - †Corbula suffalciata – type locality for species
  - †Corbula torta
  - †Corbula williardi – type locality for species
- †Crania – tentative report
  - †Crania americana – type locality for species
- Crassatella
  - †Crassatella linteus
  - †Crassatella vadosa
- †Crenella
  - †Crenella elegantula
  - †Crenella serica
- †Creonella
  - †Creonella secunda – type locality for species
  - †Creonella subangulata
  - †Creonella triplicata
- †Cryptoconus – tentative report
  - †Cryptoconus macnairyensis
- †Cryptorhytis
  - †Cryptorhytis nobilis – type locality for species
  - †Cryptorhytis torta – type locality for species
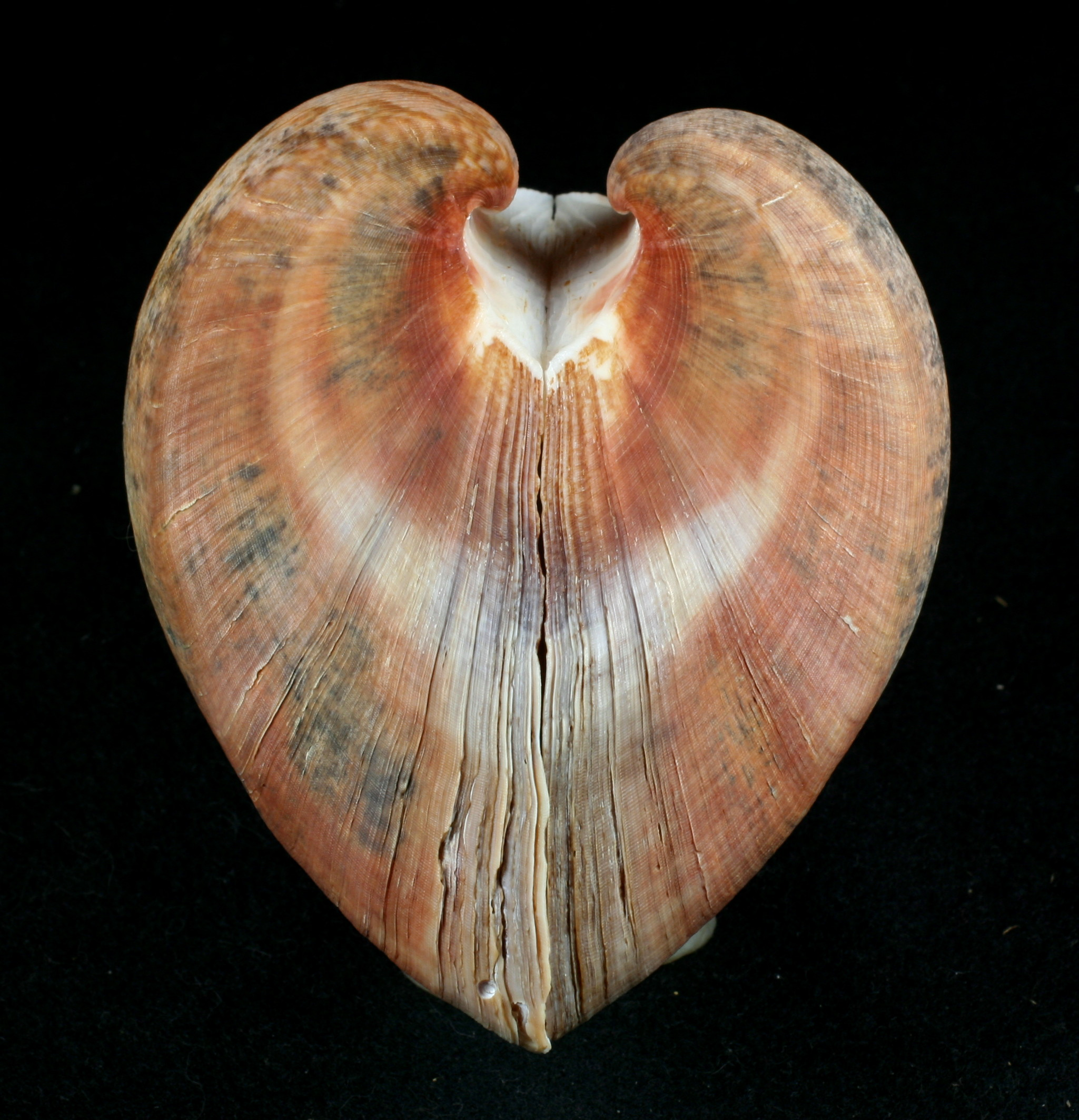
- Shell of a Cucullaea, or false ark shell
  Cucullaea
  - †Cucullaea capax
  - †Cucullaea littlei
  - †Cucullaea vulgaris
- Cyclina
  - †Cyclina magna – type locality for species
  - †Cyclina parva
- Cylichna
  - †Cylichna incisa
  - †Cylichna intermissia
  - †Cylichna intermissia curta
  - †Cylichna pessumata
  - †Cylichna recta
- †Cylindrotruncatum
  - †Cylindrotruncatum demersum
- †Cymbophora
  - †Cymbophora gracilis
- †Cyprimeria
  - †Cyprimeria alta
  - †Cyprimeria depressa

== D ==
- †Dakoticancer
  - †Dakoticancer overana
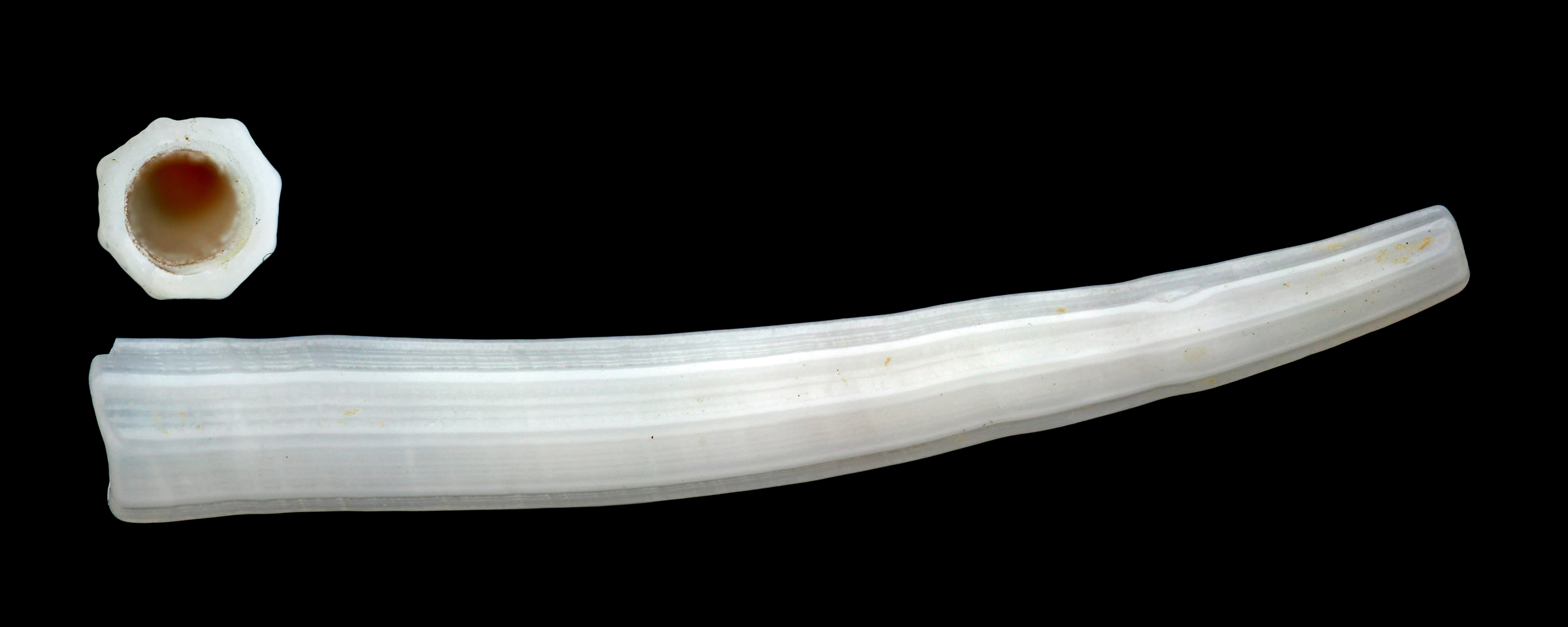
- Shell of a Dentalium tusk shell
  †Dentalium
  - †Dentalium inornatum – type locality for species
  - †Dentalium intercalatum – type locality for species
  - †Dentalium ripleyanum
- †Deussenia
  - †Deussenia bellalirata
  - †Deussenia microstriata
- †Dircella
  - †Dircella spillmani
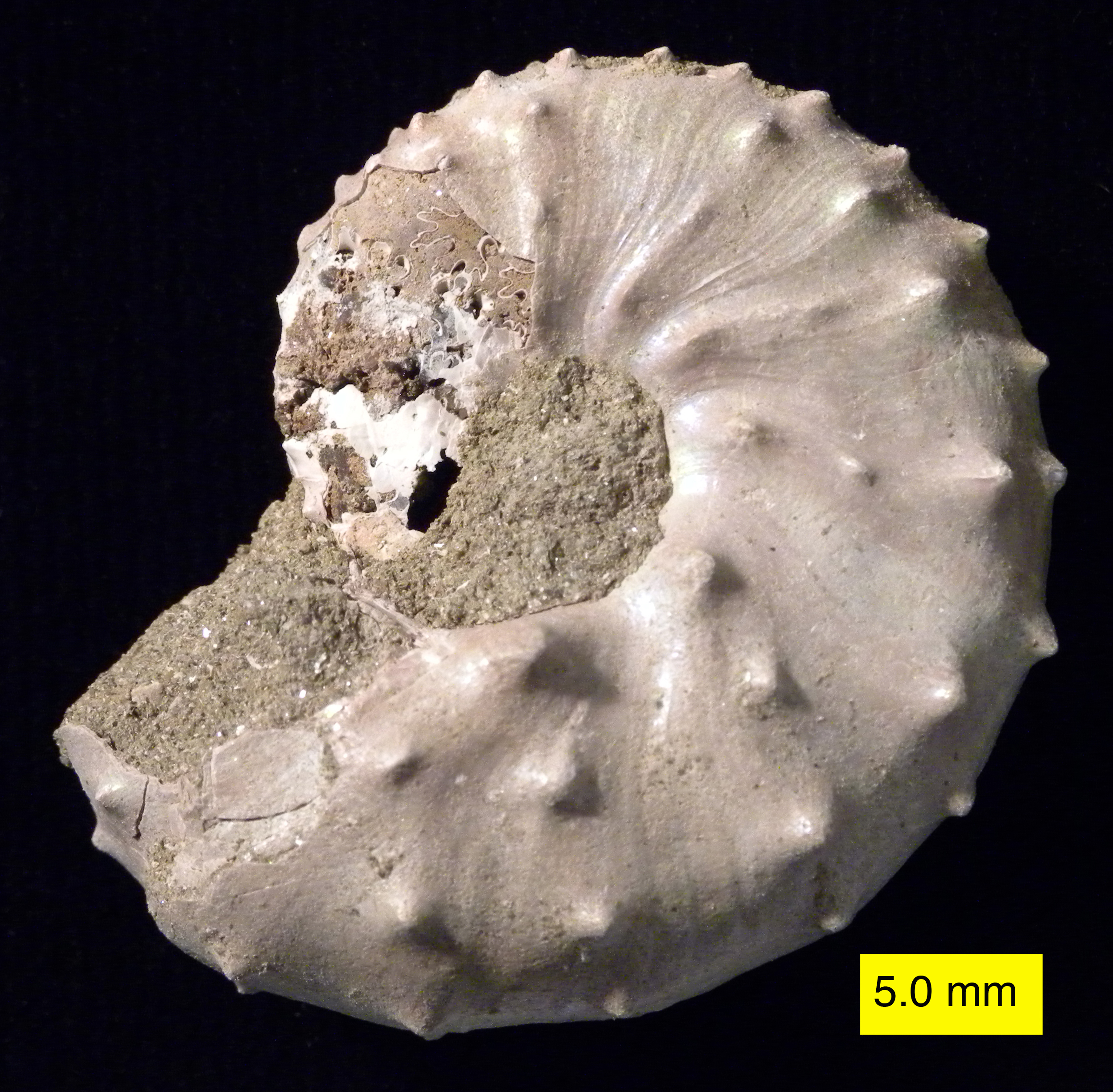
- Fossilized shell of the Late Cretaceous ammonoid cephalopod Discoscaphites
  †Discoscaphites
  - †Discoscaphites iris
- †Dolicholatirus
  - †Dolicholatirus torquatus
- †Dreissensia
  - †Dreissensia tippana
- †Drepanochilus
  - †Drepanochilus quadriliratus
- †Drilluta
  - †Drilluta communis
  - †Drilluta dimurorum – type locality for species
  - †Drilluta distans
  - †Drilluta major
- †Dysnoetopora – type locality for genus
  - †Dysnoetopora celleporoides – type locality for species

== E ==
- †Ecphora
  - †Ecphora proquadricostata
- †Ellipsoscapha
  - †Ellipsoscapha cylindrica
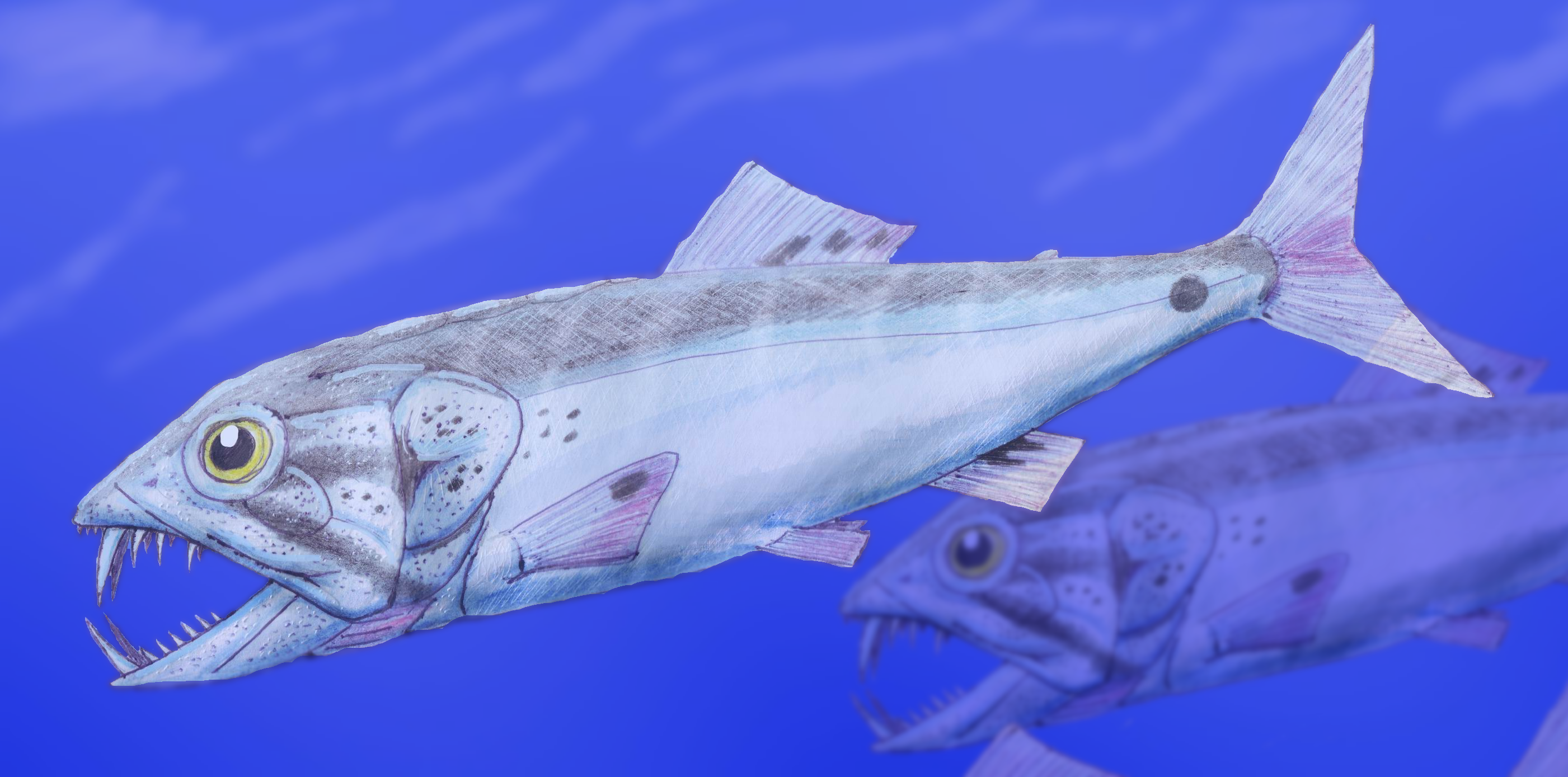
- Restoration of the Early Cretaceous-Eocene bony fish Enchodus, or the "saber-toothed herring"
  †Enchodus
- †Endoptygma
  - †Endoptygma leprosa
- †Enoploclytia
  - †Enoploclytia sculpta – type locality for species
- †Eoacteon
  - †Eoacteon ellipticus
  - †Eoacteon linteus
  - †Eoacteon percultus
- †Eothoracosaurus
  - †Eothoracosaurus mississippiensis
- †Eriptycha – tentative report
  - †Eriptycha americana – type locality for species
- †Etea
  - †Etea carolinesis
- †Eucycloscala
  - †Eucycloscala tuberculata
- †Eulima
  - †Eulima clara – type locality for species
  - †Eulima impressa – type locality for species
  - †Eulima laevigata – type locality for species
  - †Eulima persimplica
- †Euspira
  - †Euspira halli
  - †Euspira rectilabrum
- Euthriofusus – tentative report
  - †Euthriofusus convexus
  - †Euthriofusus mesozoicus
- †Eutrephoceras
  - †Eutrephoceras dekayi
- †Exilia
  - †Exilia ripleyana – type locality for species
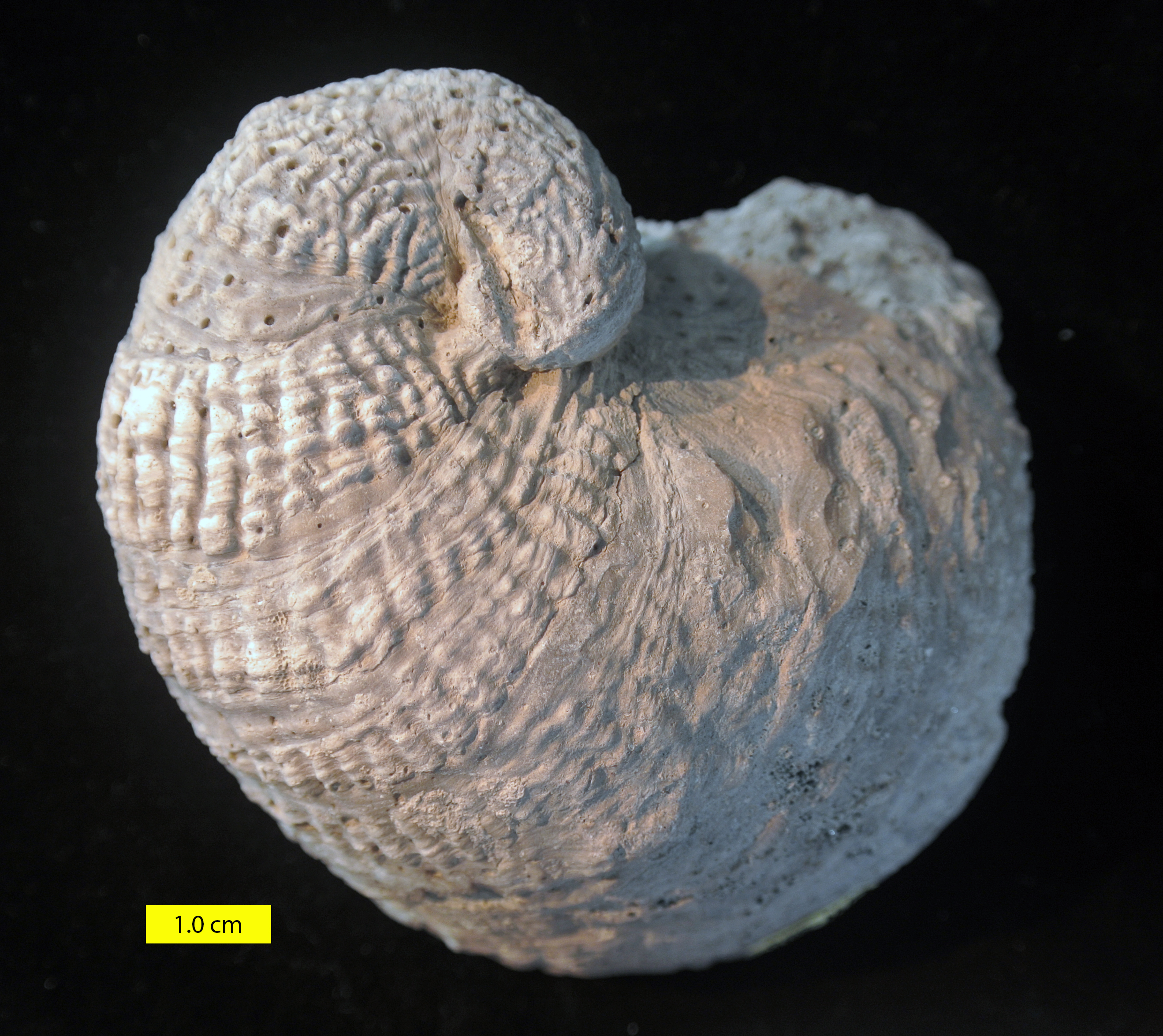
- Fossilized shell of the Jurassic-Cretaceous foam oyster Exogyra
  †Exogyra
  - †Exogyra cancellata
  - †Exogyra costata

== F ==
- Falsifusus
  - †Falsifusus convexus – type locality for species
  - †Falsifusus mesozoicus
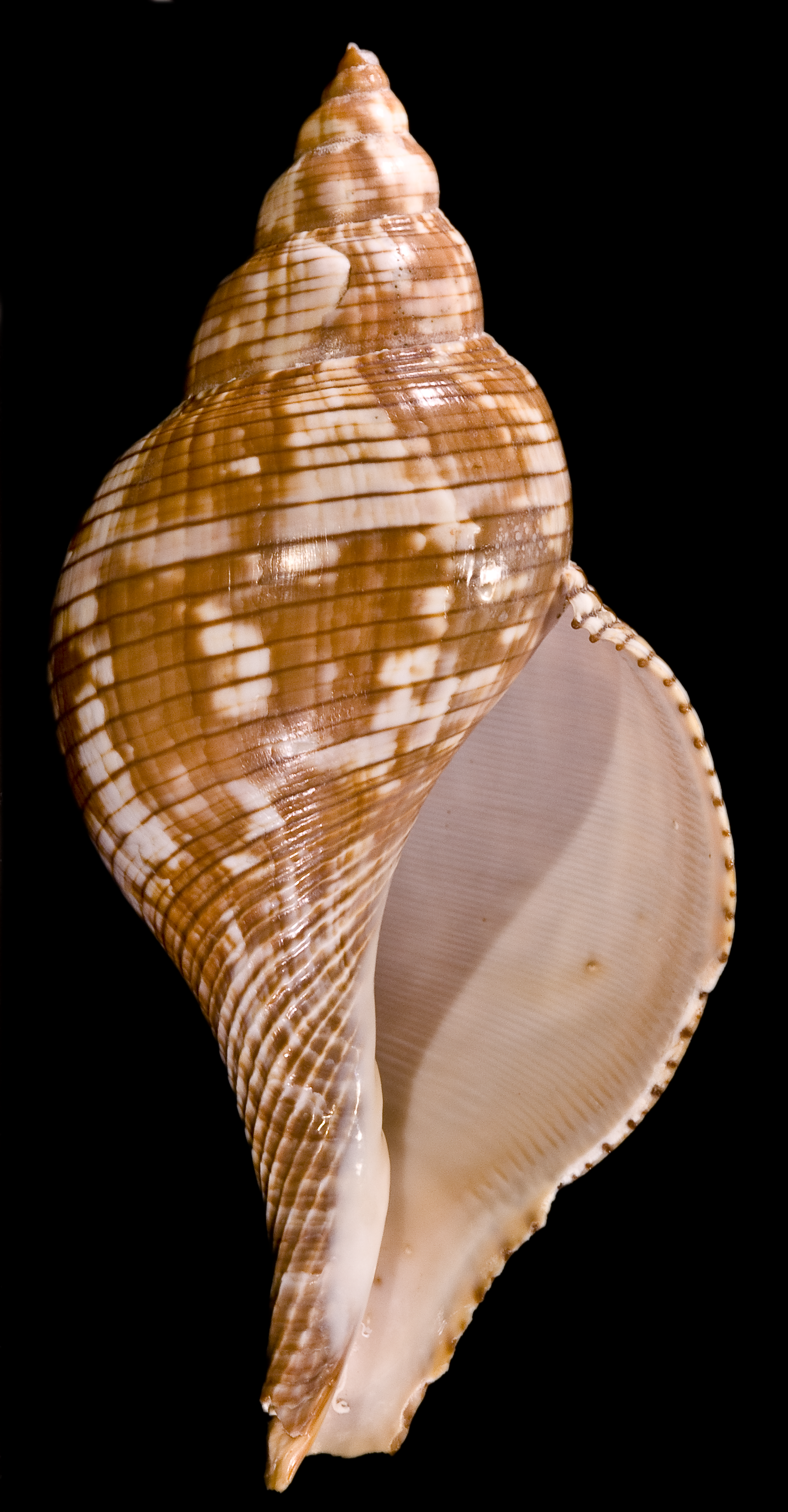
- Shell of a Fasciolaria, or tulip sea snail
  Fasciolaria – tentative report
  - †Fasciolaria ripleyana – type locality for species
- †Frurionella – type locality for genus
  - †Frurionella grandipora – type locality for species
  - †Frurionella parvipora – type locality for species
- †Fulgerca
  - †Fulgerca attenuata – type locality for species
- †Fusimilis
  - †Fusimilis proxima
  - †Fusimilis tippanus

== G ==
- Gastrochaena
  - †Gastrochaena americana
- †Gegania
  - †Gegania parabella
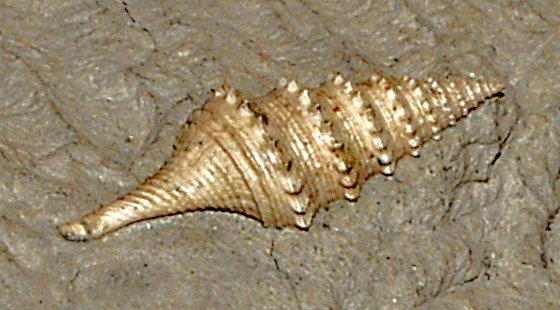
- Fossilized shell of a Gemmula sea snail, or gem turrid
  Gemmula
  - †Gemmula cretacea
- Gephyrotes
  - †Gephyrotes lamellaria – type locality for species
- †Gervilliopsis
  - †Gervilliopsis ensiformis
- Glossus
  - †Glossus conradi
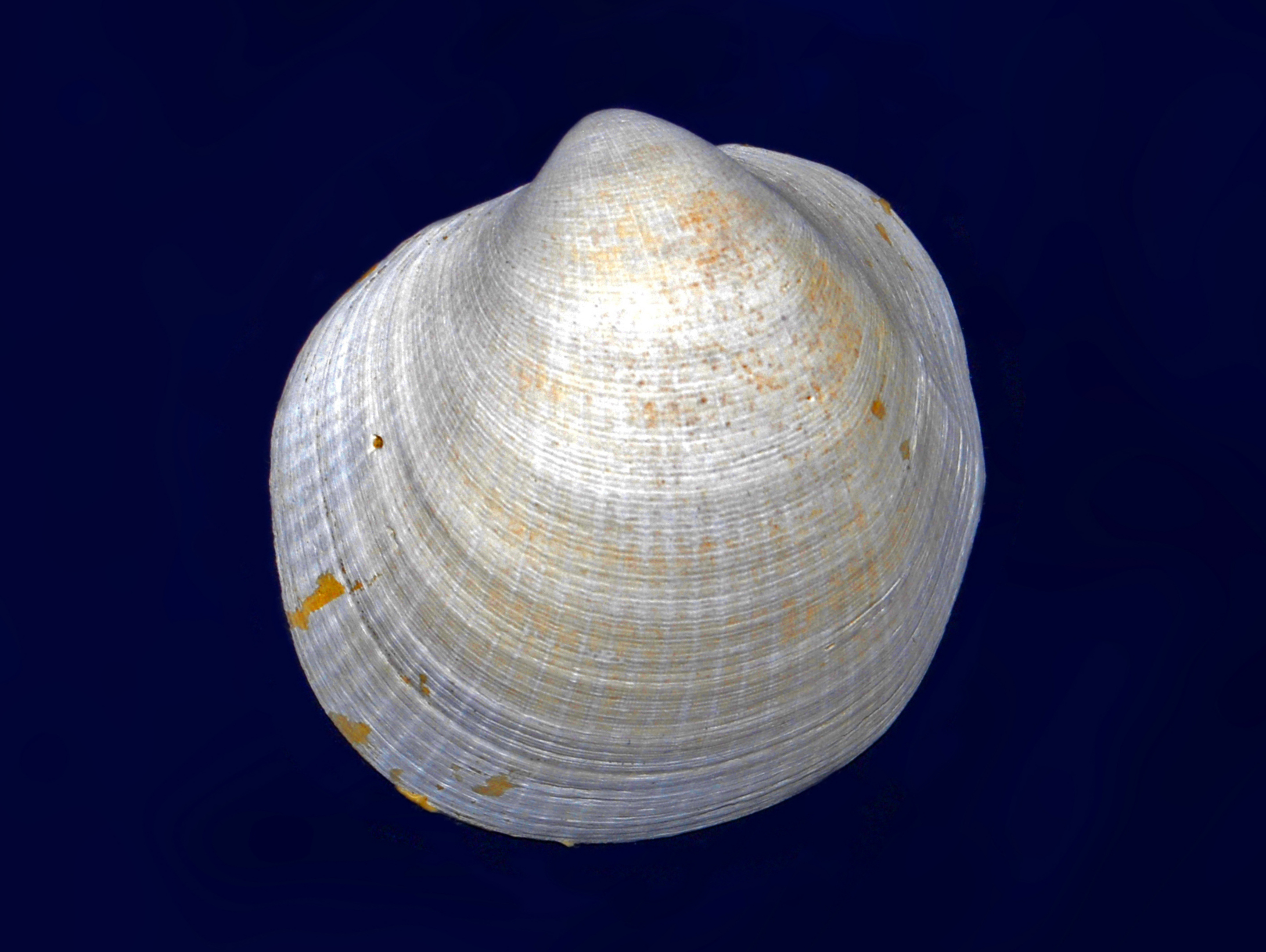
- Fossilized shell of a Glycymeris, or bittersweet clam
  Glycymeris
  - †Glycymeris lacertosa – type locality for species
  - †Glycymeris microsulci – type locality for species
  - †Glycymeris subcrenata – type locality for species
- †Goniocylichna – type locality for genus
  - †Goniocylichna bisculpturata – type locality for species
- †Graciliala
  - †Graciliala calcaris
  - †Graciliala decemlirata
- †Granocardium
  - †Granocardium dumosum
  - †Granocardium tenuistriatum
  - †Granocardium tippananum
- †Graphidula
  - †Graphidula cancellata
  - †Graphidula obscura
  - †Graphidula pergracilis
- †Gryphaeostrea
  - †Gryphaeostrea vomer
- Gyrodes
  - †Gyrodes alveata
  - †Gyrodes americanus
  - †Gyrodes crenata
  - †Gyrodes major – type locality for species
  - †Gyrodes spillmani
  - †Gyrodes supraplicatus

== H ==
- †Hamulus
  - †Hamulus angulatus
  - †Hamulus onyx
  - †Hamulus squamosus
- †Haplovoluta
  - †Haplovoluta bicarinata
- †Helicaulax
  - †Helicaulax formosa
- †Helicoceras
  - †Helicoceras navarroense
- †Hemiacirsa
  - †Hemiacirsa cretacea
- Hemiaster
  - †Hemiaster lacunosus
  - †Hemiaster stella
  - †Hemiaster ungula
- †Hercorhyncus
  - †Hercorhyncus bicarinatus
  - †Hercorhyncus pagodaformis
  - †Hercorhyncus tennesseensis
- Heteropora
  - †Heteropora tennesseensis – type locality for species
- †Hippocampoides
  - †Hippocampoides liratus – type locality for species
  - †Hippocampoides serratus
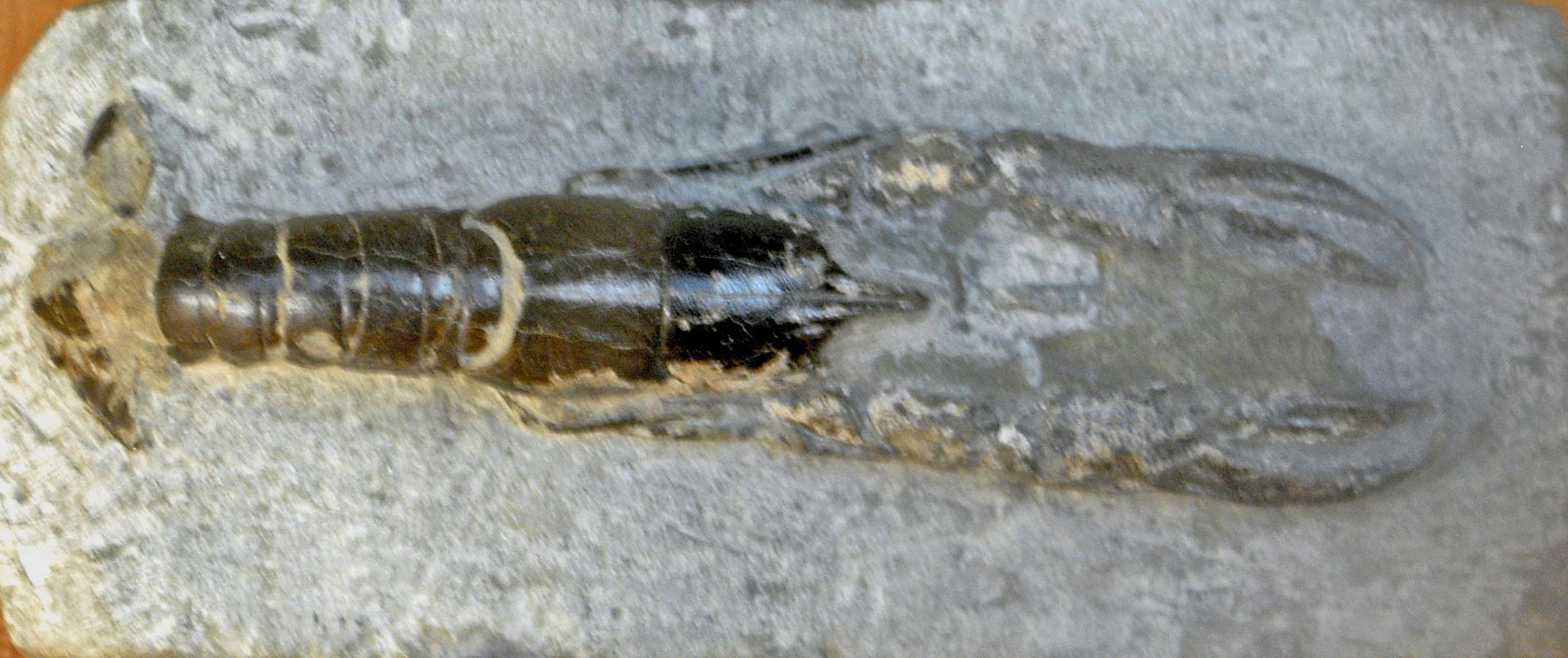
- Fossil of the Jurassic-Paleogene lobster Hoploparia
  †Hoploparia
  - †Hoploparia tennesseensis – type locality for species
- †Hydrotribulus
  - †Hydrotribulus nodosus

== I ==
- †Icanotia
  - †Icanotia pulchra – type locality for species
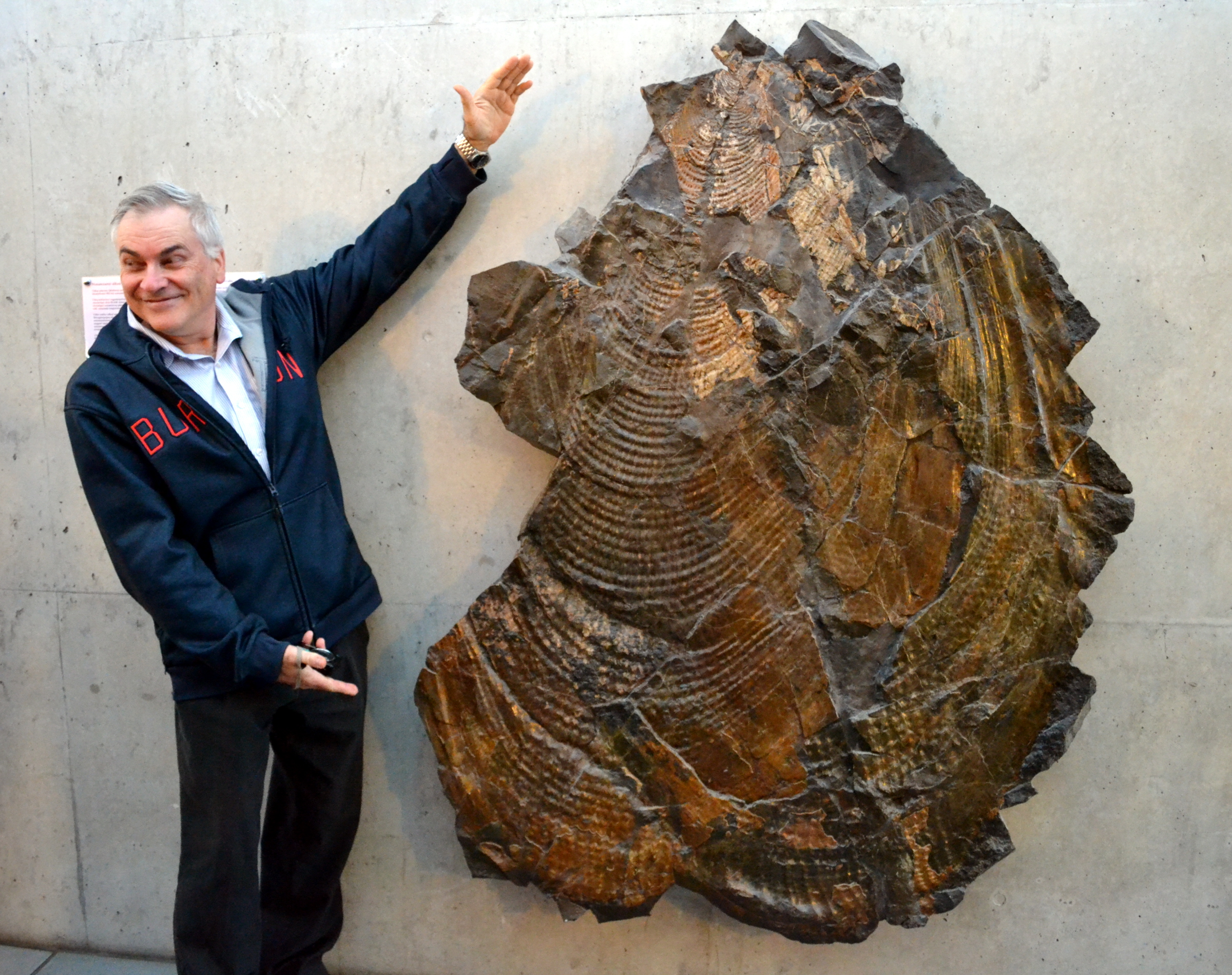
- Fossilized shell of the Early Jurassic-Late Cretaceous marine bivalve Inoceramus with a human indicating its size
  †Inoceramus
  - †Inoceramus proximus
  - †Inoceramus sagensis
- †Inoperna
  - †Inoperna carolinensis
- †Ischyrhiza
  - †Ischyrhiza mira

== J ==
- Juliacorbula
  - †Juliacorbula monmouthensis

== L ==
- †Lacrimiforma
  - †Lacrimiforma secunda
- †Latiala
  - †Latiala lobata – type locality for species
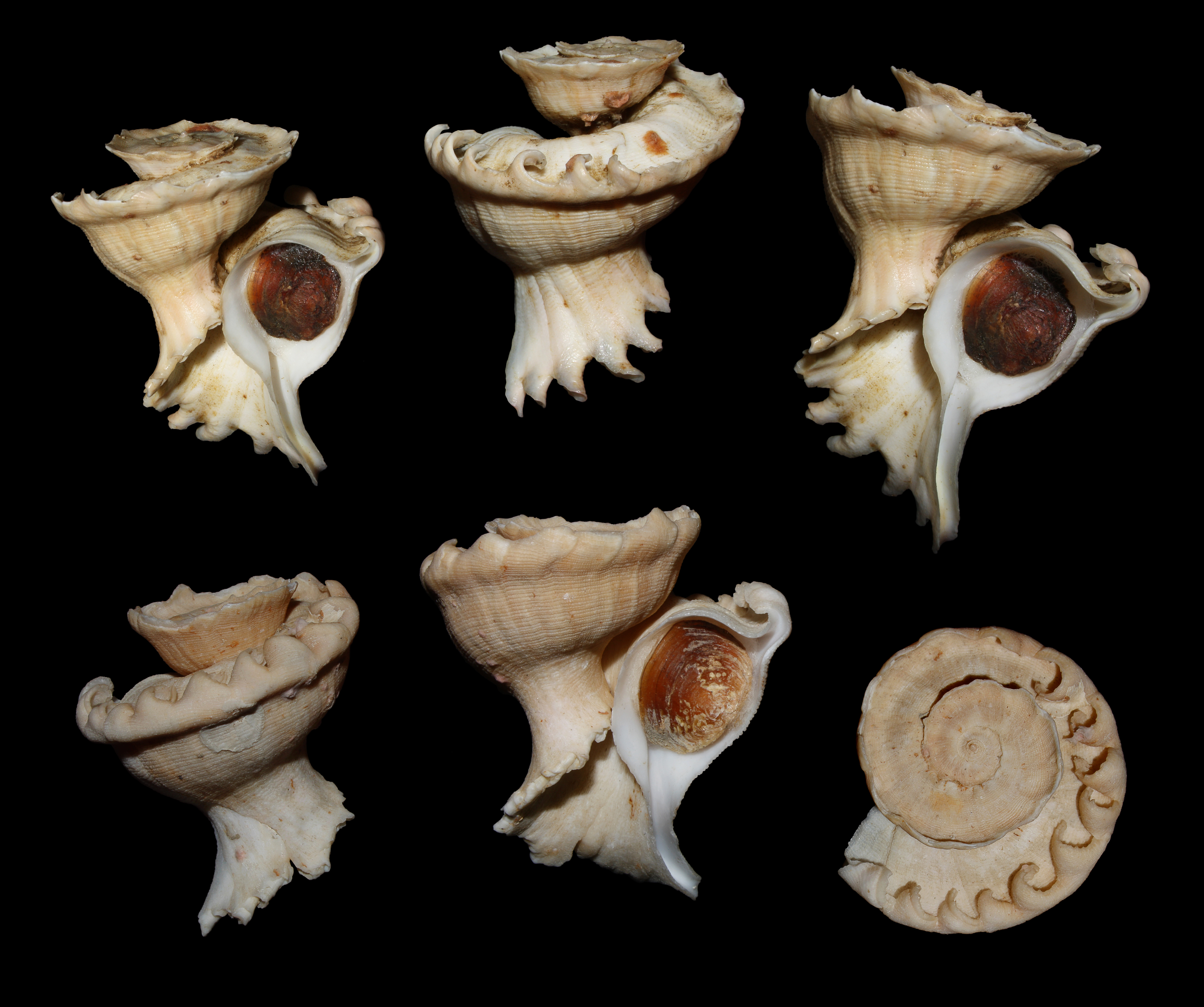
- Shells in multiple views of Latiaxis coral sea snails
  Latiaxis
  - †Latiaxis serratus
- †Laxispira
  - †Laxispira lumbricalis
- †Leda
  - †Leda whitfieldi
- †Legumen
  - †Legumen planulatum
- Leiostraca
  - †Leiostraca cretacea
- †Lemniscolittorina
  - †Lemniscolittorina berryi
- †Leptosolen
  - †Leptosolen biplicata
- Limatula
  - †Limatula woodsi – type locality for species
- Limopsis
  - †Limopsis meeki – type locality for species
  - †Limopsis perbrevis – type locality for species
- †Linearis
  - †Linearis metastriata
  - †Linearis ornatissima
- †Liopeplum
  - †Liopeplum canalis
  - †Liopeplum carinatum – type locality for species
  - †Liopeplum cretaceum
  - †Liopeplum leioderma
  - †Liopeplum leiodermum
  - †Liopeplum subjugosum
- †Liopistha
  - †Liopistha inflata
  - †Liopistha protexta
- †Liothyris
  - †Liothyris carolinensis
- †Lirosoma
  - †Lirosoma cretacea
- Lithophaga
  - †Lithophaga conchafodentis
  - †Lithophaga ripleyana
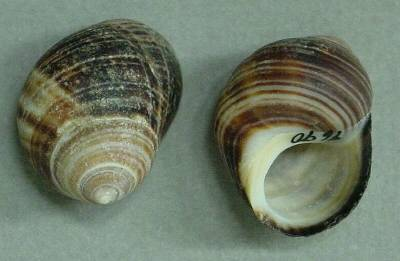
- Shells in differing orientation of a Littorina sea snail, or periwinkle
  Littorina
  - †Littorina berryi – type locality for species
- †Lomirosa
  - †Lomirosa cretacea
- †Longoconcha
  - †Longoconcha tennesseensis
- Lopha
  - †Lopha falcata
- †Lowenstamia
  - †Lowenstamia liratus
- †Lucina
  - †Lucina ripleyana – type locality for species
- †Lupira
  - †Lupira turbinea
  - †Lupira variabilis

== M ==
- †Mammila
  - †Mammila americana – type locality for species
- Martesia
  - †Martesia procurva – type locality for species
  - †Martesia truncata – type locality for species
- †Mataxa
  - †Mataxa elegans
- †Mathilda
  - †Mathilda ripleyana
- †Mathildia
  - †Mathildia ripleyana – type locality for species
- Melanatria
  - †Melanatria cretacea – type locality for species
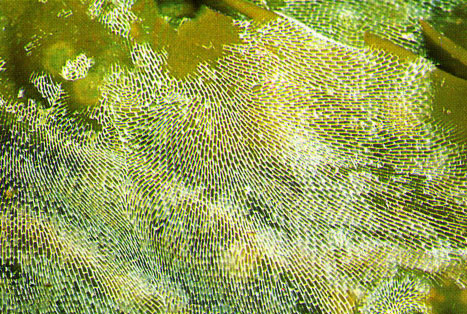
- Living Membranipora bryozoan
  Membranipora
  - †Membranipora crassimargo – type locality for species
- Membraniporella
  - †Membraniporella irregularis – type locality for species
- Meretrix
  - †Meretrix cretacea
  - †Meretrix eufaulensis
- †Mesorhytis
  - †Mesorhytis obscura – type locality for species
- †Mesostoma
  - †Mesostoma americanum – type locality for species
  - †Mesostoma costatum – type locality for species
- †Metopaster
  - †Metopaster tennesseensis – type locality for species
- †Micrabacia
  - †Micrabacia marylandica
- Micropora
  - †Micropora baccata – type locality for species
- †Mitridomus
  - †Mitridomus ripleyana
- †Morea
  - †Morea cancellaria
  - †Morea corsicanensis
  - †Morea marylandica
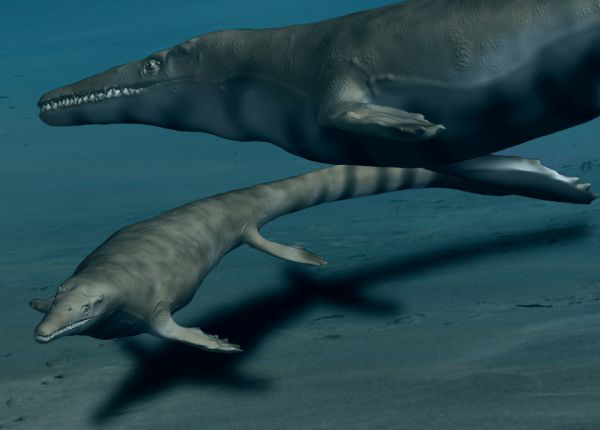
- Life restoration of two of the Late Cretaceous Mosasaurus
  †Mosasaurus
  - †Mosasaurus maximus
- †Mystriopora – tentative report
  - †Mystriopora stipata – type locality for species

== N ==
- †Napulus
  - †Napulus reesidei
- †Neithea
  - †Neithea quinquecostata
- †Nemodon
  - †Nemodon eufaulensis
  - †Nemodon grandis – type locality for species
  - †Nemodon stantoni
- †Nonactaeonina
  - †Nonactaeonina orientalis
- †Notopocorystes
  - †Notopocorystes testacea – type locality for species
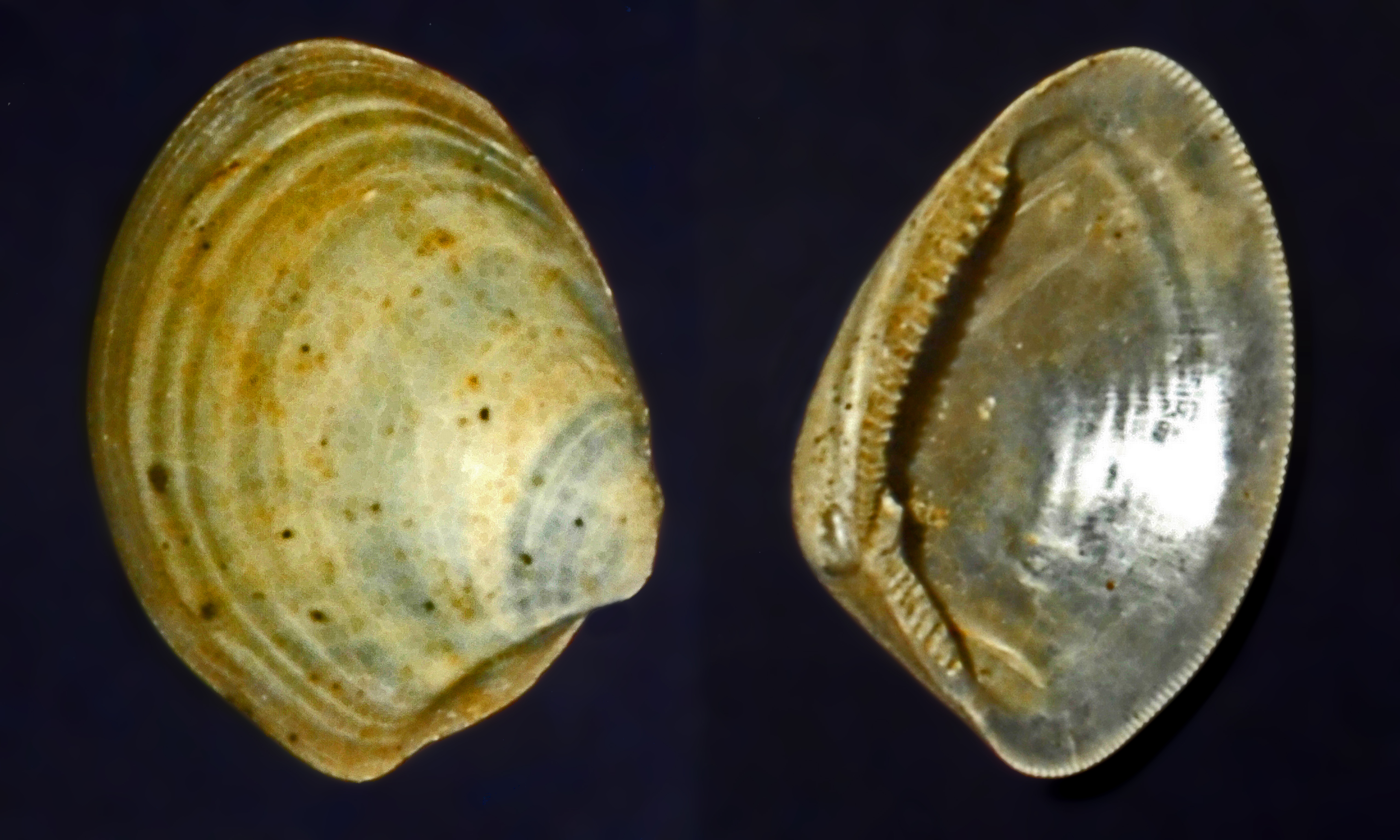
- Interior of a fossilized shell of the Early Ordovician-modern marine bivalve Nucula
  Nucula
  - †Nucula microconcentrica – type locality for species
  - †Nucula percrassa
- Nuculana
  - †Nuculana australis – type locality for species
- †Nudivagus
  - †Nudivagus simplicus

== O ==
- †Obeliscus
  - †Obeliscus conellus
- †Odontobasis
  - †Odontobasis australis – type locality for species
- †Odontofusus
  - †Odontofusus curvicostata – type locality for species
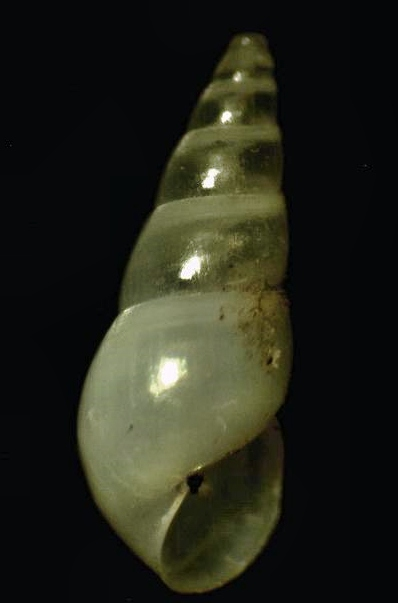
- Shell of an Odostomia fusulus pyram sea snail
  †Odostomia
  - †Odostomia impressa – type locality for species
  - †Odostomia plicata – type locality for species
- †Oligoptycha
  - †Oligoptycha americana
- Opalia
  - †Opalia fistulosa
  - †Opalia wadei
- †Ornopsis
  - †Ornopsis digressa – type locality for species
  - †Ornopsis elevata
  - †Ornopsis glenni
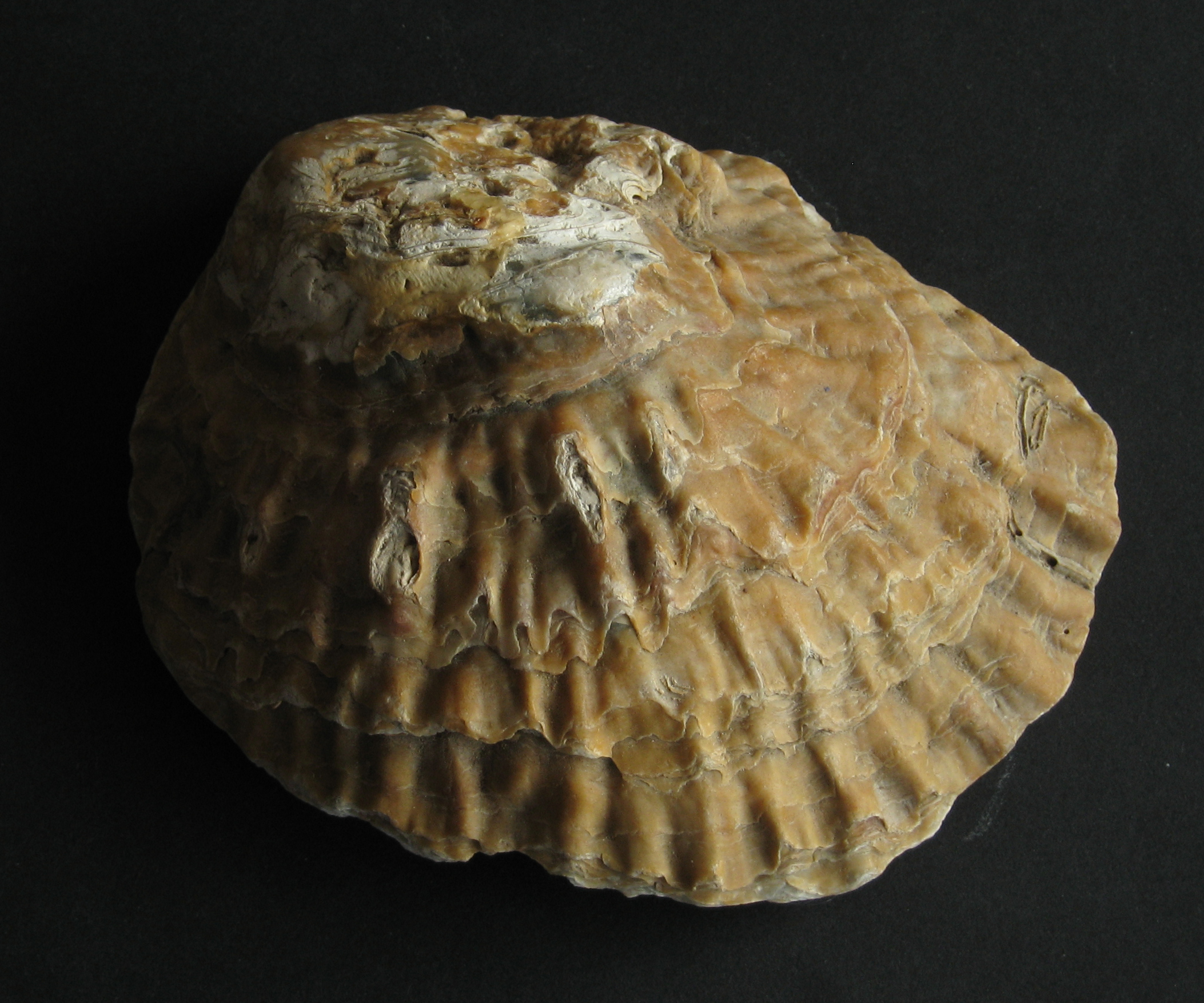
- Shell of an Ostrea, or oyster
  Ostrea
  - †Ostrea bryani
  - †Ostrea mcnairyensis – type locality for species
  - †Ostrea monmouthensis
  - †Ostrea penegemmea – type locality for species

== P ==
- †Paladmete
  - †Paladmete cancellaria
  - †Paladmete densata – type locality for species
  - †Paladmete gardnerae – type locality for species
- †Paleopsephaea – type locality for genus
  - †Paleopsephaea mutabilis – type locality for species
  - †Paleopsephaea pergracilis – type locality for species
- Panopea
  - †Panopea desica
- †Parafusus
  - †Parafusus callilateris
  - †Parafusus coloratus
  - †Parafusus saffordi
- †Paramorea
  - †Paramorea lirata
- † Paranomia
  - †Paranomia scabra
- †Parietiplicatum
  - †Parietiplicatum conicum
- †Parvivoluta – type locality for genus
  - †Parvivoluta concinna – type locality for species
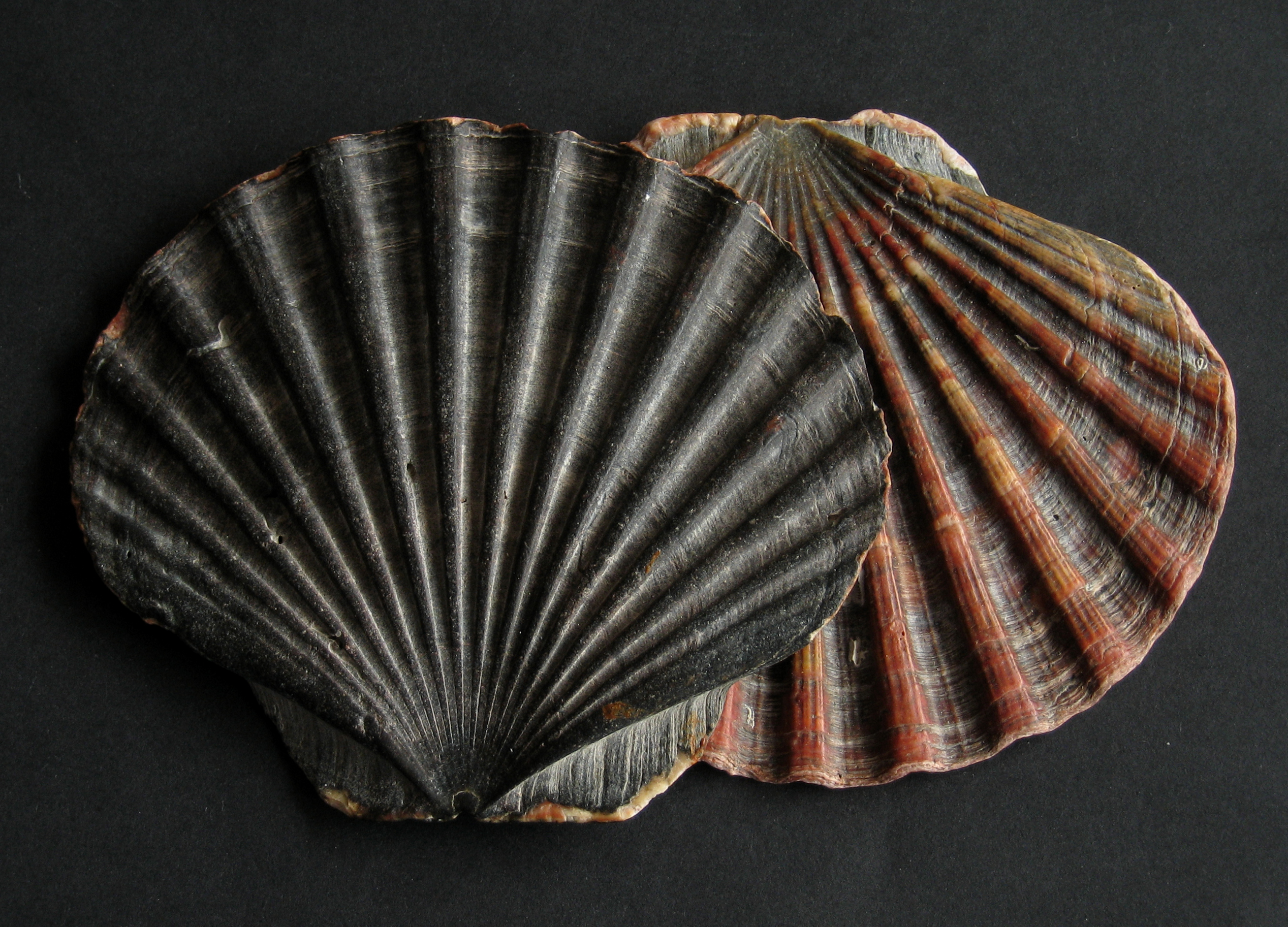
- Shells of Pecten scallops
  †Pecten
  - †Pecten argillensis
  - †Pecten burlingtonensis
  - †Pecten quinquenarius
  - †Pecten simplicius
- †Pedalion
  - †Pedalion periridescens – type locality for species
- †Peneus
  - †Peneus wenasogensis – type locality for species
- Periploma
  - †Periploma applicata
- †Perissolax
  - †Perissolax whitfieldi
- Pholadomya
  - †Pholadomya conradi
  - †Pholadomya occidentalis
- †Piestochilus
  - †Piestochilus cancellatus – type locality for species
  - †Piestochilus pergracilis – type locality for species
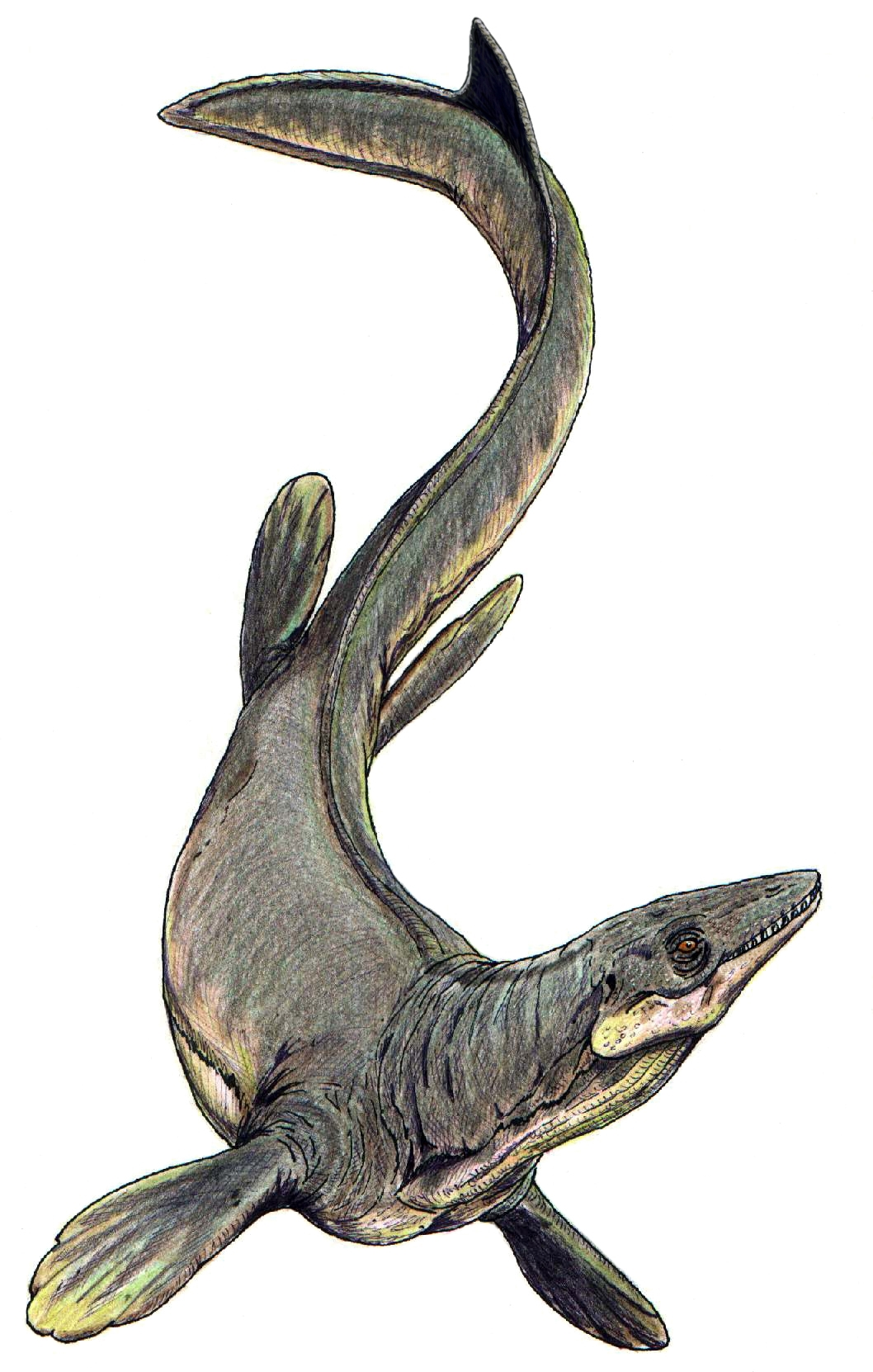
- Life restoration of the Late Cretaceous mosasaur Plioplatecarpus
  †Plioplatecarpus
  - †Plioplatecarpus depressus
- †Podocratus
  - †Podocratus canadensis
- Polinices
  - †Polinices kummeli
  - †Polinices stephensoni – type locality for species
  - †Polinices umbilica – type locality for species
- †Polyascosoecia
  - †Polyascosoecia tripora – type locality for species
- †Postligata
  - †Postligata crenata – type locality for species
  - †Postligata wordeni
- †Praeleda
  - †Praeleda compar
- †Prognathodon
- †Promathildia
  - †Promathildia cretacea – type locality for species
- †Protobusycon
  - †Protobusycon cretaceum
- †Protocardia
  - †Protocardia parahillana – type locality for species
- †Pseudocardia
  - †Pseudocardia gregaria
  - †Pseudocardia subangulata – type locality for species
  - †Pseudocardia subcircula – type locality for species
- †Pseudolimea
  - †Pseudolimea reticulata
- Pseudomalaxis
  - †Pseudomalaxis amplificata – type locality for species
  - †Pseudomalaxis pilsbryi
  - †Pseudomalaxis ripleyana – type locality for species
- †Pteria
  - †Pteria percompressa – type locality for species
  - †Pteria petrosa
- †Pterocerella
  - †Pterocerella poinsettiformis
  - †Pterocerella tippana
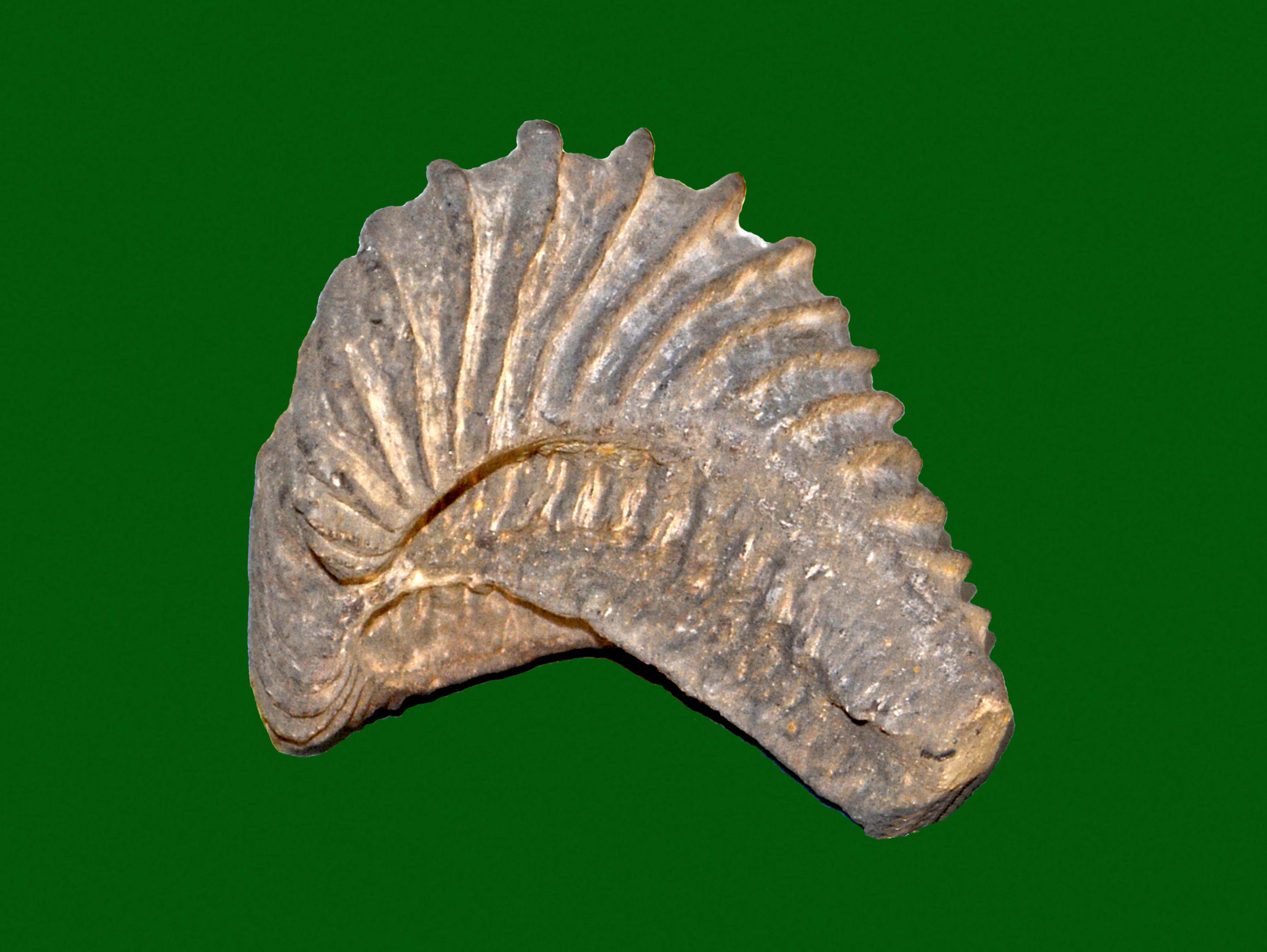
- Fossilized shell of the Jurassic-Cretaceous marine bivalve Pterotrigonia
  †Pterotrigonia
  - †Pterotrigonia angulicostata
  - †Pterotrigonia thoracica
- †Ptychosyca
  - †Ptychosyca inornata
- †Pugnellus
  - †Pugnellus densatus
  - †Pugnellus goldmani
- Pulvinites
  - †Pulvinites argentea
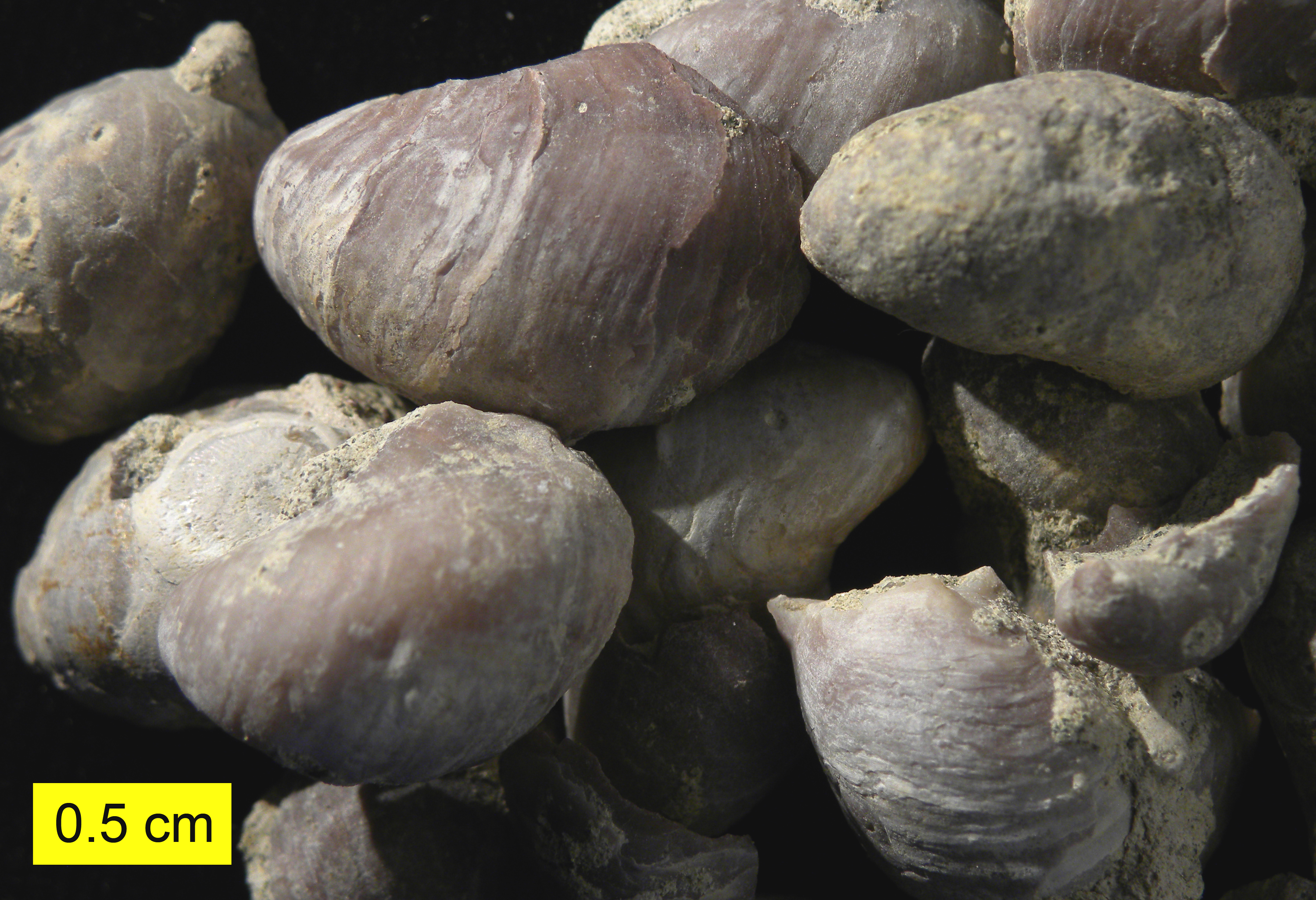
- Assemblage of fossilized shells of the Cretaceous-Pleistocene oyster Pycnodonte
  Pycnodonte
  - †Pycnodonte vesiculare
- †Pyrifusus
  - †Pyrifusus ejundicus
  - †Pyrifusus subdensatus
  - †Pyrifusus subliratus – type locality for species
- †Pyropsis
  - †Pyropsis interstriatus
  - †Pyropsis perornatus
  - †Pyropsis proxima – type locality for species
  - †Pyropsis spinosus

== R ==
- †Reinhardites
  - †Reinhardites anthophorus
- †Remera
  - †Remera stephensoni
- †Remnita
  - †Remnita anomalocostata
  - †Remnita biacuminata
- †Rhombopsis
  - †Rhombopsis microstriatus – type locality for species
  - †Rhombopsis orientalis – type locality for species
- Ringicula
  - †Ringicula pulchella
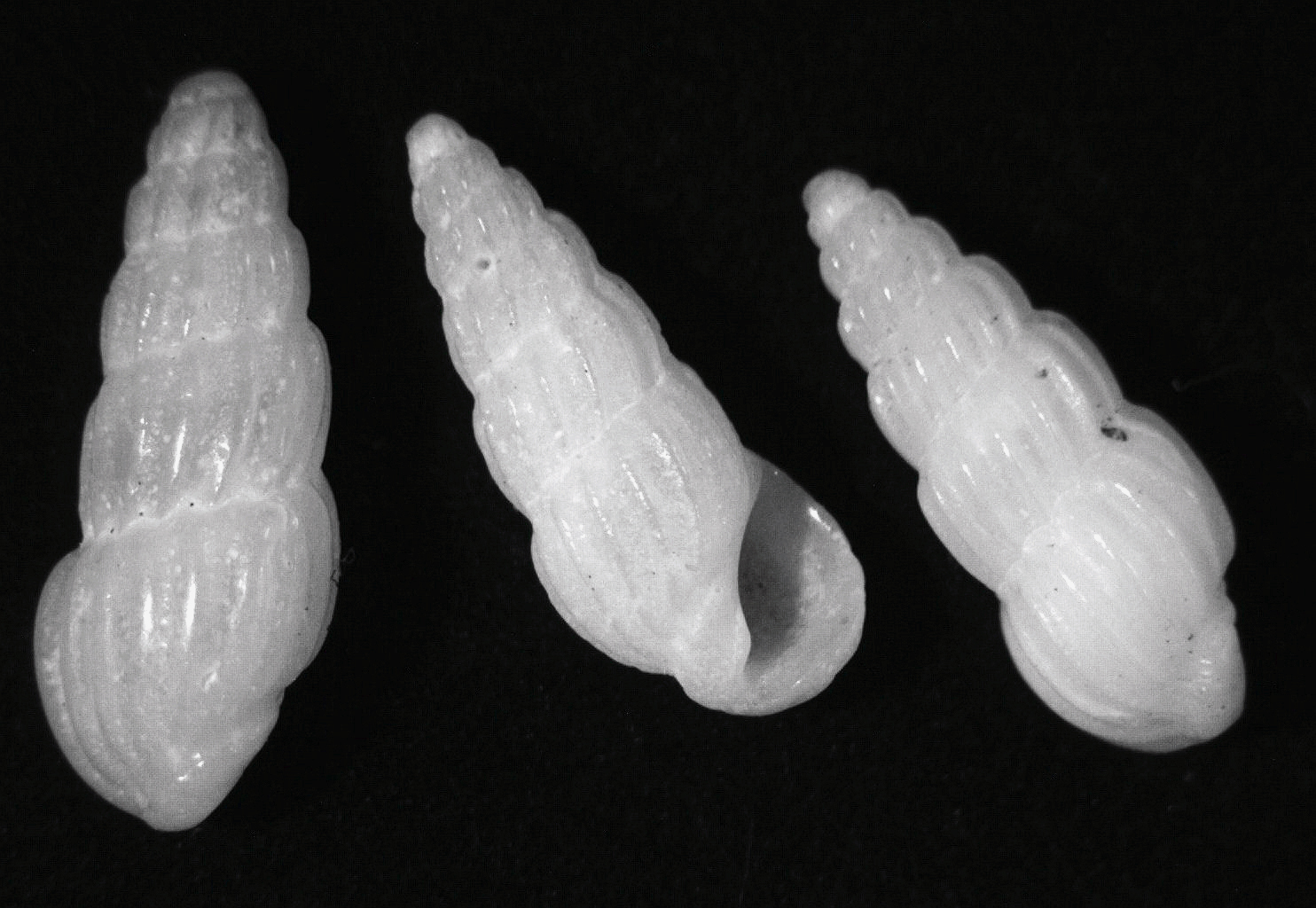
- Fossilized shells of the sea snail Rissoina
  Rissoina
  - †Rissoina fragilis – type locality for species
  - †Rissoina subornata – type locality for species
  - †Rissoina tennesseensis – type locality for species
- Rostellaria – tentative report
  - †Rostellaria mcnairyensis – type locality for species

== S ==
- †Sargana
  - †Sargana stantoni
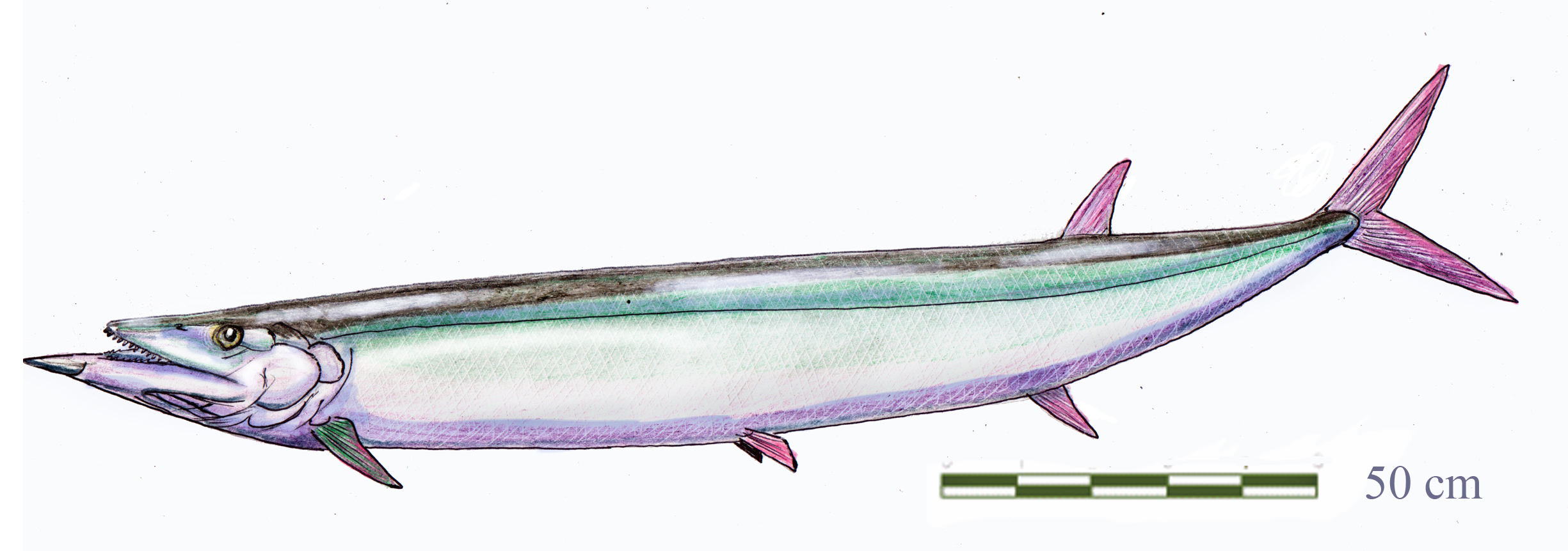
- Restoration of the Late Cretaceous bony fish Saurodon
  †Saurodon – tentative report
- †Scala
  - †Scala sillimani
- Scalpellum
- †Scambula
  - †Scambula perplana
- Scaphander
  - †Scaphander rarus – type locality for species
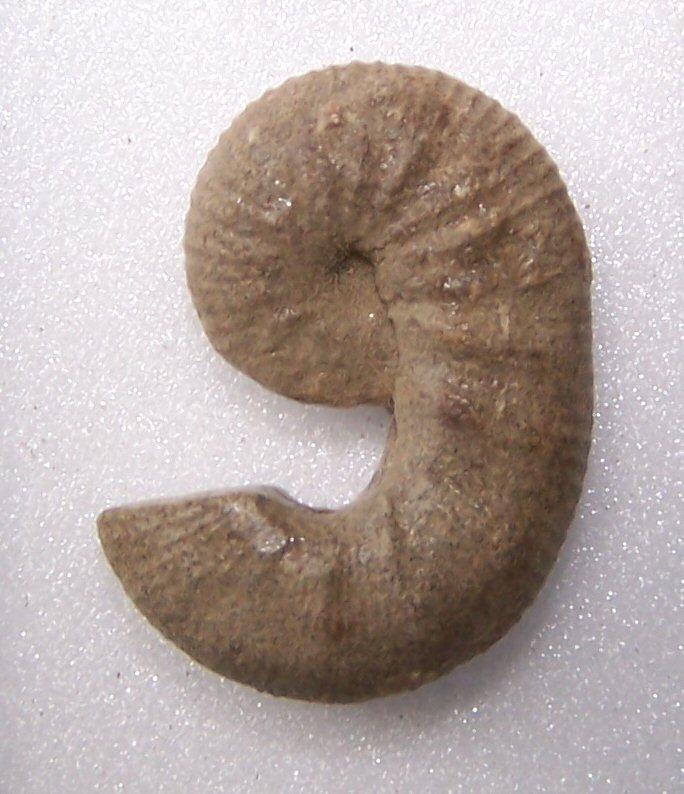
- Fossilized shell of the Late Cretaceous ammonoid cephalopod Scaphites
  †Scaphites
  - †Scaphites reesidei – type locality for species
- †Schizobasis
  - †Schizobasis depressa
  - †Schizobasis immersa – type locality for species
- Seila
  - †Seila quadrilirata
- †Seminola
  - †Seminola crassa
  - †Seminola solida
- Serpula
  - †Serpula adnata – type locality for species
  - †Serpula pervermiformis – type locality for species
- Serpulorbis
  - †Serpulorbis marylandica
  - †Serpulorbis tennesseensis – type locality for species
- †Serrifusus
  - †Serrifusus tennesseensis – type locality for species
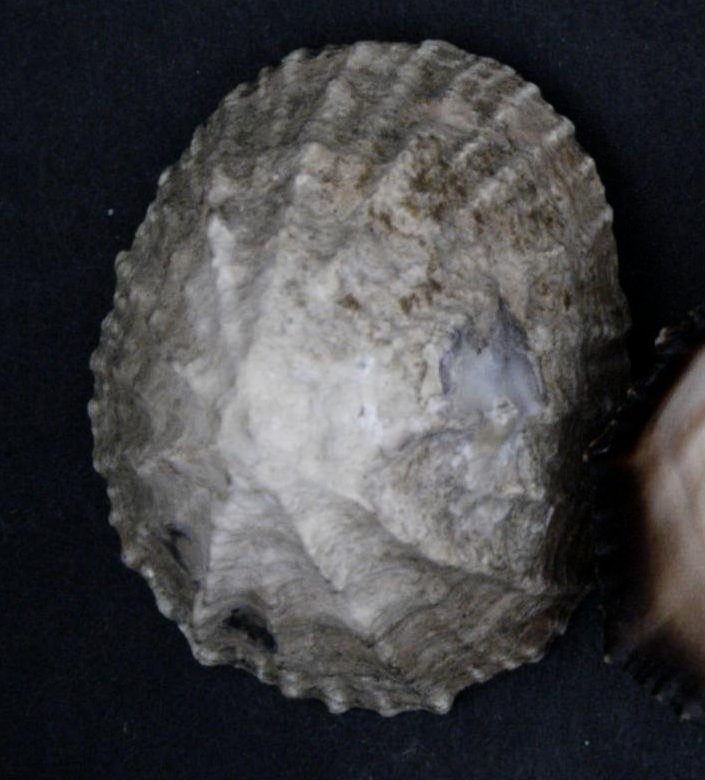
- Shell of a Siphonaria false limpet sea snail
  †Siphonaria
  - †Siphonaria wieseri – type locality for species
- †Solariorbis
  - †Solariorbis clara
- †Solyma
  - †Solyma elliptica
- †Stantonella – type locality for genus
  - †Stantonella subnodosa – type locality for species
- †Stephanophyllia
  - †Stephanophyllia cribraria
- Striarca
- †Striaticostatum
  - †Striaticostatum pondi
- †Syncyclonema
  - †Syncyclonema simplicius

== T ==
- †Tectaplica
  - †Tectaplica simplica
- Teinostoma
  - †Teinostoma prenanum – type locality for species
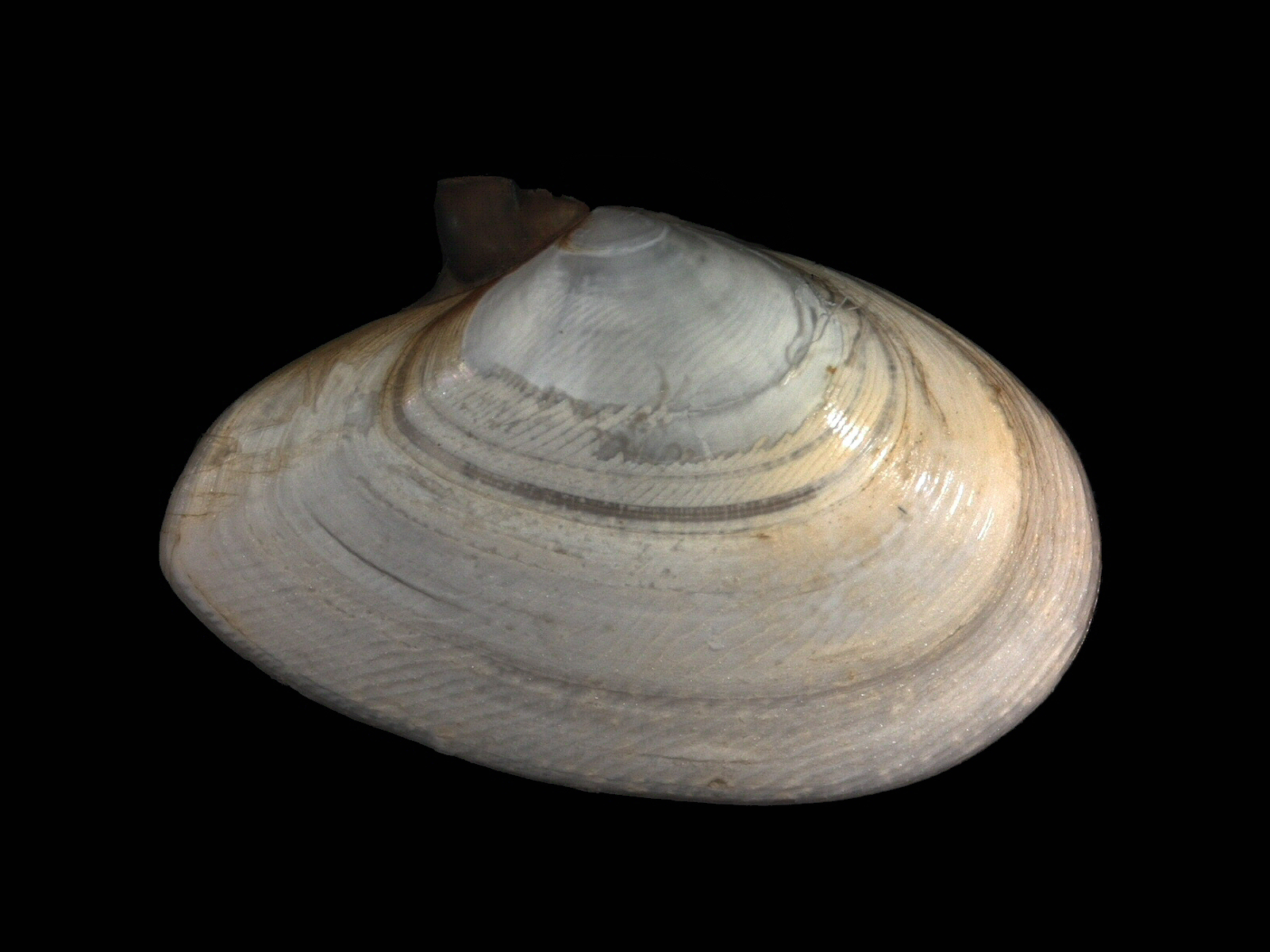
- Shell of a Tellina, or tellin
  Tellina
  - †Tellina multiconcentrica – type locality for species
- †Tellinimera
  - †Tellinimera eborea
- †Tenea
  - †Tenea parilis
- †Teredo
  - †Teredo rectus – type locality for species
- †Thylacus
  - †Thylacus cretaceus
- †Tintorium
  - †Tintorium pagodiforme
- †Tornatellaea
  - †Tornatellaea cretacea – type locality for species
  - †Tornatellaea globulosa – type locality for species
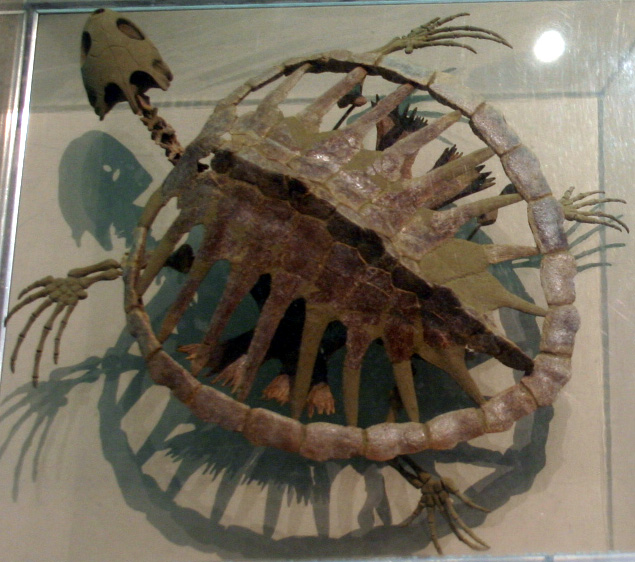
- Mounted fossilized skeleton of the Late Cretaceous sea turtle Toxochelys
  †Toxochelys
  - †Toxochelys latiremis
- Trichotropis
  - †Trichotropis imperfecta – type locality for species
- †Trigonia
  - †Trigonia eufalensis
- †Trochifusus
  - †Trochifusus interstriatus – type locality for species
  - †Trochifusus perornatus – type locality for species
  - †Trochifusus spinosus – type locality for species
- Trochus
  - †Trochus ripleyanus – type locality for species
- †Troostella – type locality for genus
  - †Troostella perimpressa – type locality for species
  - †Troostella substriatus
- †Tuba
  - †Tuba parabella – type locality for species
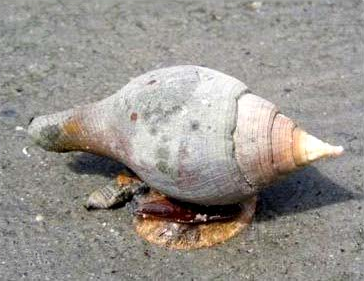
- A living Turbinella, or chank
  Turbinella
  - †Turbinella major – type locality for species
  - †Turbinella variabilis – type locality for species
- Turboella
  - †Turboella costata
- †Turricula
  - †Turricula amica
  - †Turricula anomalocostata – type locality for species
  - †Turricula biacuminata – type locality for species
  - †Turricula fasciolata – type locality for species
  - †Turricula gracilis – type locality for species
  - †Turricula mcnairyensis – type locality for species
  - †Turricula ripleyana
- Turris
  - †Turris constricta – type locality for species
  - †Turris proxima – type locality for species
- Turritella
  - †Turritella bilira
  - †Turritella encrinoides
  - †Turritella macnairyensis
  - †Turritella mcnairyensis – type locality for species
  - †Turritella paravertebroides
  - †Turritella tippana
  - †Turritella trilira
  - †Turritella vertebroides

== U ==
- †Unicardium
  - †Unicardium concentricum – type locality for species
- †Urceolabrum
  - †Urceolabrum tuberculatum

== V ==
- †Variseila
  - †Variseila meeki
- †Veniella
  - †Veniella conradi
- †Vetericardia
  - †Vetericardia crenalirata
- †Volutoderma
  - †Volutoderma appressa – type locality for species
  - †Volutoderma protracta
  - †Volutoderma tennesseensis – type locality for species
- †Volutomorpha
  - †Volutomorpha aspera
  - †Volutomorpha gigantea – type locality for species
  - †Volutomorpha mutabilis – type locality for species
  - †Volutomorpha retifera – or unidentified comparable form

== W ==
- †Wadeopsammia
  - †Wadeopsammia nodosa – type locality for species
- †Weeksia
  - †Weeksia amplificata
- †Woodsella – type locality for genus
  - †Woodsella typica – type locality for species
- †Wormaldia
  - †Wormaldia praemissa – type locality for species

== Y ==
- Yoldia
  - †Yoldia longifrons
  - †Yoldia multiconcentrica – type locality for species
