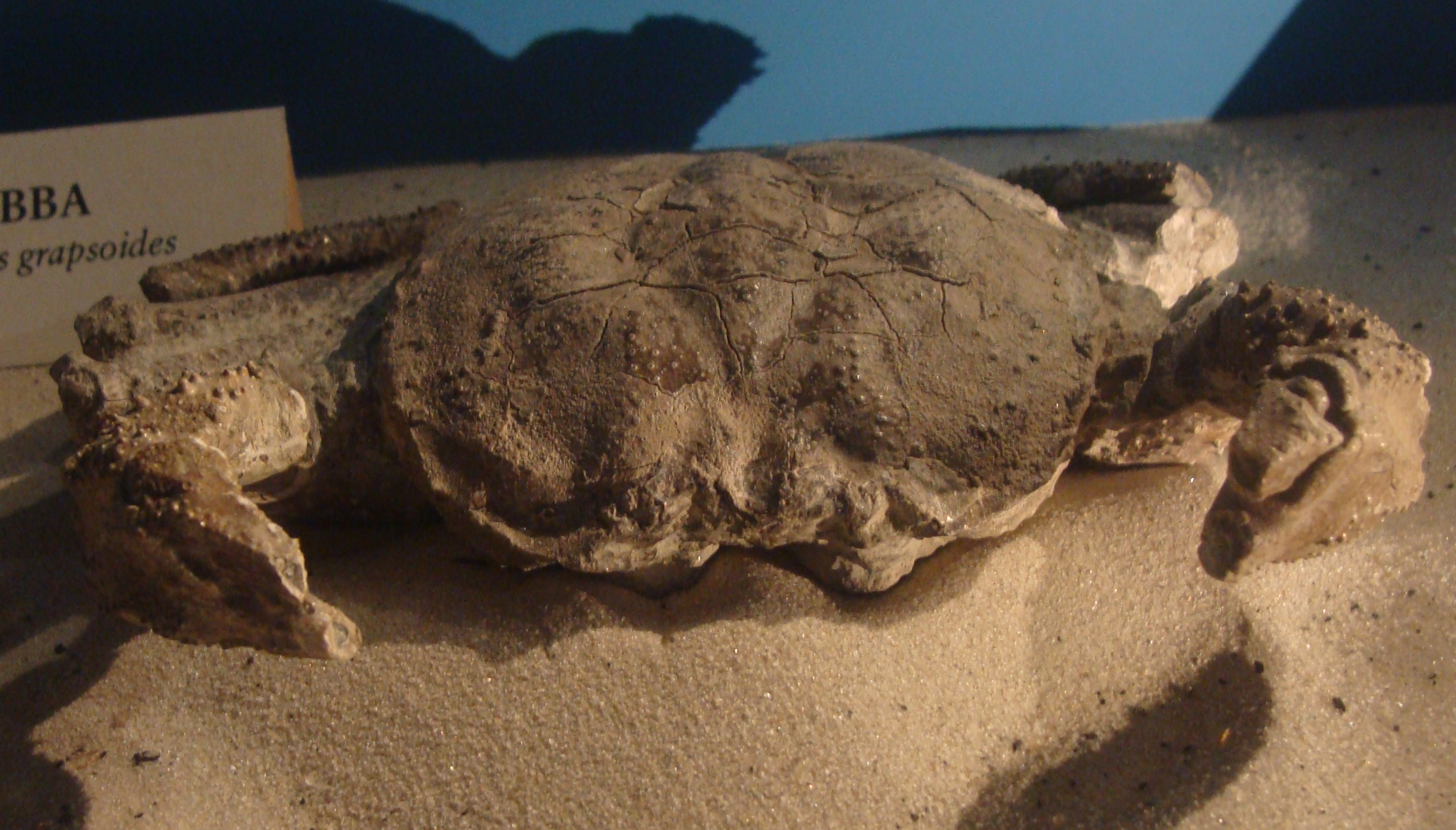
- Avitelmessus grapsoides

Scientific classification
- Kingdom: Animalia
- Phylum: Arthropoda
- Clade: Pancrustacea
- Class: Malacostraca
- Order: Decapoda
- Suborder: Pleocyemata
- Infraorder: Brachyura
- Section: †Dakoticancroida
- Superfamily: †Dakoticancroidea; Rathbun, 1917

Families
- Dakoticancridae; Ibericancridae

= Dakoticancroidea =

Dakoticancroidea Temporal range: Santonian–Maastrichtian

Extinct superfamily of crabs

Dakoticancroidea is a superfamily of fossil crabs divided into the following two families:

- † Dakoticancridae Rathbun, 1917
  - † Avitelmessus Rathbun, 1923
  - † Dakoticancer Rathbun, 1917
  - † Tetracarcinus Weller, 1905
- † Ibericancridae Artal, Guinot, Van Bakel & Castillo, 2008
  - † Ibericancer Artal, Guinot, Van Bakel & Castillo, 2008
  - † Sodakus Bishop, 1978
  - † Tropidicarcinus Schweitzer, Feldmann, Phillips & Armstrong, 2019
