= Ibericancer =

Ibericancer Temporal range: Late Cretaceous, late Campanian

Scientific classification
- Kingdom: Animalia
- Phylum: Arthropoda
- Class: Malacostraca
- Order: Decapoda
- Suborder: Pleocyemata
- Infraorder: Brachyura
- Family: †Ibericancridae
- Genus: †Ibericancer; Artal, Guinot, Van Bakel & Castillo, 2008
- Species: †I. sanchoi

Binomial name
- †Ibericancer sanchoi Artal, Guinot, Van Bakel & Castillo, 2008

Monotypic genus of fossil crabs

Ibericancer is a monotypic genus of fossil crabs. Its single species, Ibericancer sanchoi, was found in Spain.
