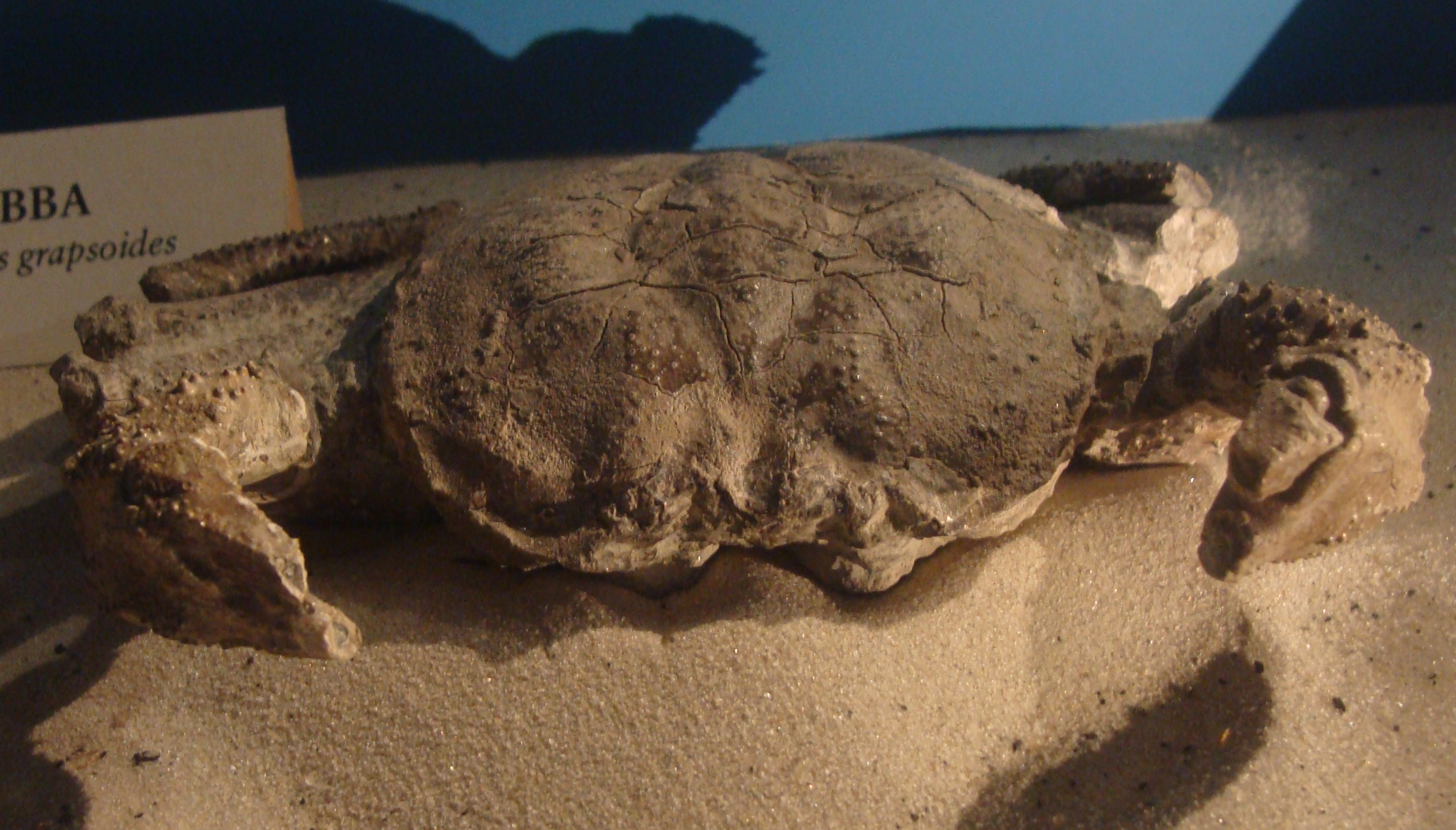
- Fossil of Avitelmessus grapsoideus

Scientific classification
- Domain: Eukaryota
- Kingdom: Animalia
- Phylum: Arthropoda
- Class: Malacostraca
- Order: Decapoda
- Suborder: Pleocyemata
- Infraorder: Brachyura
- Family: †Dakoticancridae
- Genus: †Avitelmessus; Rathbun, 1923
- Species: †A. grapsoideus

Binomial name
- †Avitelmessus grapsoideus Rathbun, 1923

= Avitelmessus =

Avitelmessus Temporal range: Late Cretaceous, Maastrichtian

Extinct genus of crabs

Avitelmessus is an extinct genus of crab from the Late Cretaceous Peedee Formation and Ripley Formation of the United States. The type and only species is A. grapsoideus.

== Taxonomic history ==
Avitelmessus was described in 1923 by Mary J. Rathbun, who assigned it to the family Atelecyclidae. Martin Glaessner reassigned it to the family Dakoticancridae in 1960.

== Description ==
The shell of Avitelmessus was about 2.25 inches (5.7 cm) in length and was nearly ovular in shape, with a "rounded outline". The upper surface was marked by "broad, shallow grooves" which formed two attached diamond-like shapes, with the larger one closer to the front. "Subsidiary" grooves came in contact with both sides of the larger diamond. The "fairly blunt" anterior edge of the carapace possessed a small, central rostrum, with orbits on either side. The front legs were modified to become chelipeds, with pincers formed by an upper finger, which was movable, and a lower finger, which was stationary (an extension of the previous leg segment). All limbs were covered by "fine granules". At least one specimen with "color markings" (considered rare among fossil crabs) has been discovered. The colors are described as "a medium background, dark spots and blotches, and light lines".

== Fossil sites ==
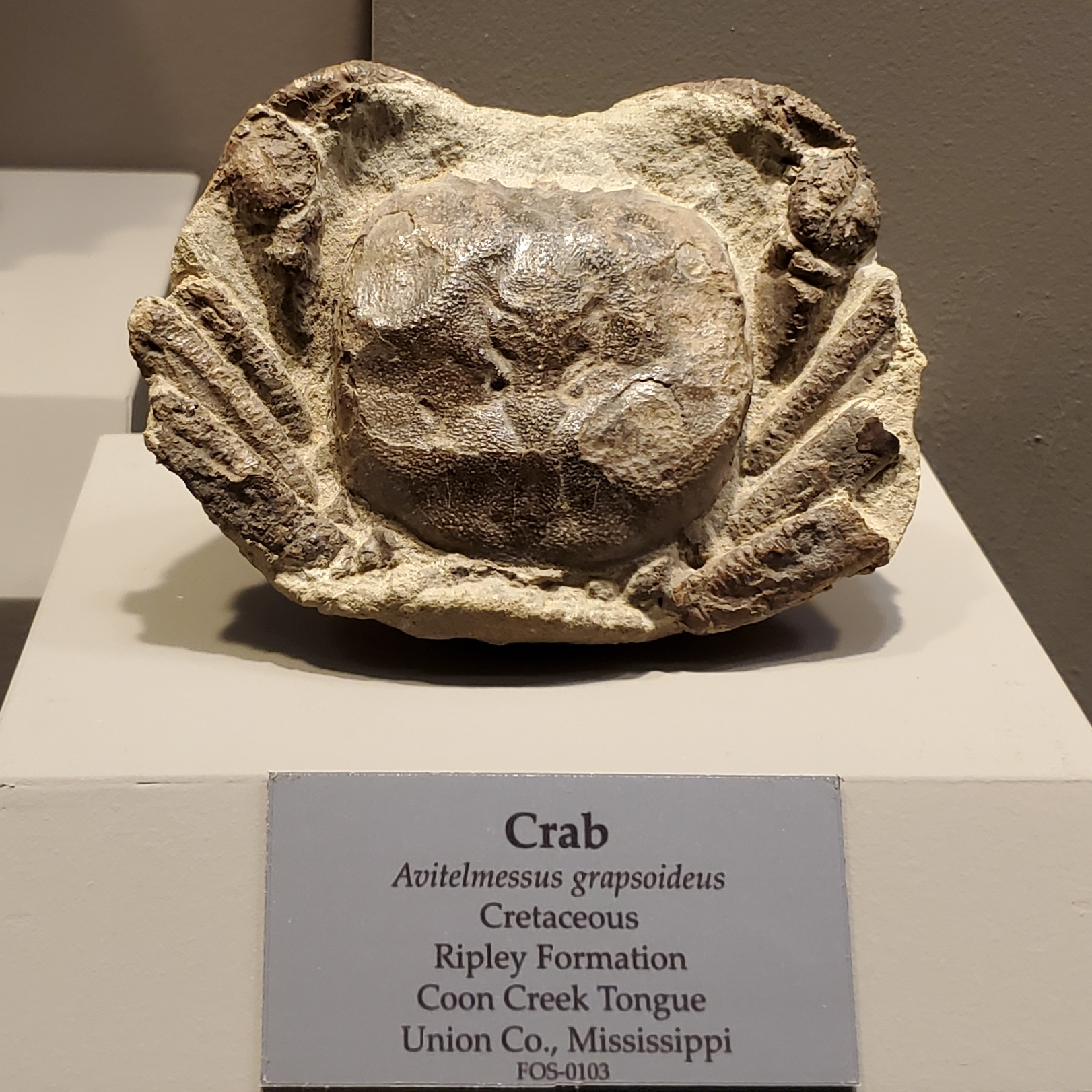
Fossil in the Tellus Science Museum

Avitelmessus was originally described by Rathbun based on the holotype from the Peedee Formation of North Carolina, as well as specimens from the Ripley Formation of Mississippi. Later, she would also describe specimens from western Tennessee. Avitelmessus is also present on the Atlantic coastal plain and in the Mississippi Embayment. The "near restriction" of Avitelmessus to the Mississippi embayment (and that of other Dakoticancridae members to other specific areas) suggest "provincialism" among the family.
