= Acteon conicus =

Scientific classification
- Kingdom: Animalia
- Phylum: Mollusca
- Class: Gastropoda
- Superfamily: Acteonoidea
- Family: Acteonidae
- Genus: Acteon
- Species: A. conicus

Binomial name
- Acteon conicus Thiele, 1925

Species of marine gastropod

Acteon conicus is a species of sea snail, a marine gastropod mollusc in the family Acteonidae.

== Distribution ==
This marine species occurs off the Agulhas Bank, South Africa.
