= Odostomia plicata =

Scientific classification
- Kingdom: Animalia
- Phylum: Mollusca
- Class: Gastropoda
- Family: Pyramidellidae
- Genus: Odostomia
- Species: O. plicata

Binomial name
- Odostomia plicata (Montagu, 1803)

Species of gastropod

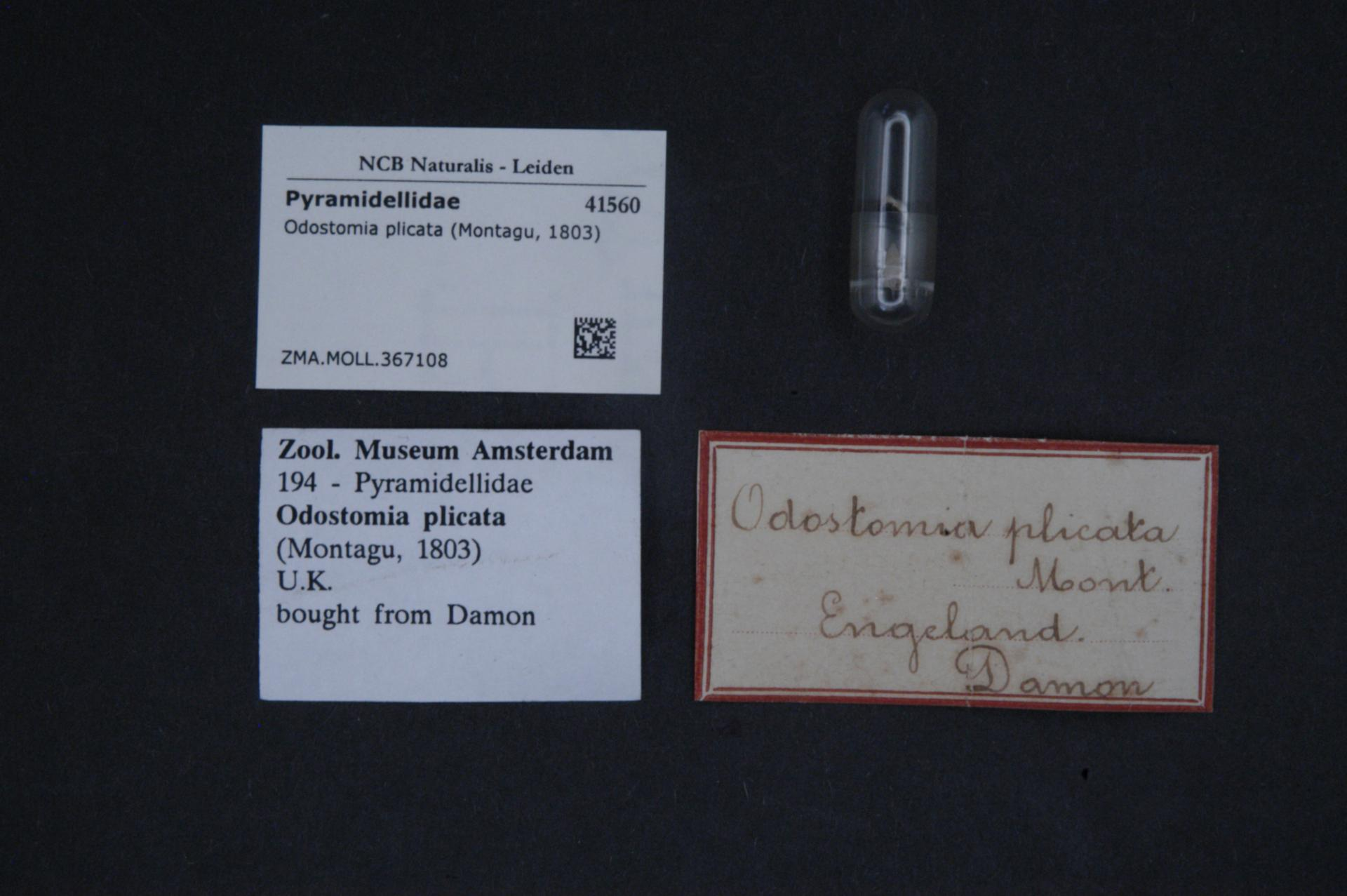

Odostomia plicata is a species of sea snail, a marine gastropod mollusc in the family Pyramidellidae, the pyrams and their allies.

== Description ==
The thin shell is transparent and polished. Its length measures 2.5 mm. It is marked with microscopic spiral striae. Its color is very pale yellowish white or white, darker at the suture. There are 5 to 6 whorls in the teleoconch. The sutures are moderately impressed. There is no umbilicus or a narrow chink in full-grown specimens. The columellar tooth is small, but distinct.

== Distribution ==
This species occurs in the following locations:

- British Isles
- European waters (ERMS scope)
- Greek Exclusive Economic Zone
- Irish Exclusive economic Zone
- Portuguese Exclusive Economic Zone
- South West Coast of Apulia
- Spanish Exclusive Economic Zone
- United Kingdom Exclusive Economic Zone
