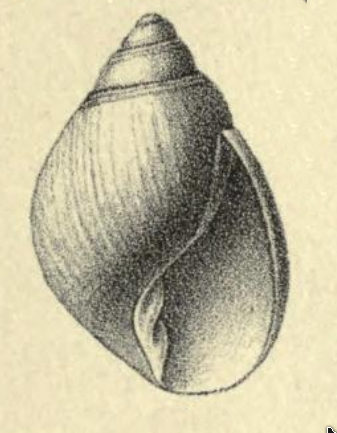
- Shell of Microglyphis perconica (holotype)

Scientific classification
- Kingdom: Animalia
- Phylum: Mollusca
- Class: Gastropoda
- Superorder: Ringiculimorpha
- Superfamily: Ringiculoidea
- Family: Ringiculidae
- Genus: Microglyphis
- Species: M. perconica

Binomial name
- Microglyphis perconica (Dall, 1890)

Synonyms
- Actaeon perconicus Dall, 1890 (original combination); Microglyphis perconicus [sic] (incorrect gender ending)

= Microglyphis perconica =

Species of gastropod

Microglyphis perconica is a species of sea snail, a marine gastropod mollusk in the family Ringiculidae.

== Description ==
The length of the shell attains 5 mm, its diameter 3 mm.

(Original description) The shell is pear-shaped or conic. Its spire is rather acute, polished ivory white. It contains four whorls beside the protoconch. The transverse sculpture consists of incremental lines. The spiral sculpture consists of three to five close-set, sharp, punctate grooves in front of the suture, more distant anteriorly, and a similar but more numerous and uniformly spaced series just behind the columella, behind which again are four or five widely separated similar grooves, the posterior near the periphery. Between them and near the periphery, as well as behind it, are no grooves or but faint spiral obsolete striae. The suture is distinct but not channelled. The body whorl is much the largest. The outer lip is straight, simple and slightly thickened. The body of the shell has a moderate deposit of callus. The columella is as in Microglyphis curtula (Dall, 1890), but is less strongly twisted and with the plait and recurved margin subequal. Although the margin is continuous, there is a rather deep sulcus behind the anterior end of the columella, corresponding to a groove, which bounds the columella callus.

== Distribution ==
This marine species occurs off the Galápagos Islands.
