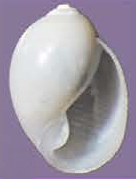
- Ringiculoides kurilensis shell

Scientific classification
- Kingdom: Animalia
- Phylum: Mollusca
- Class: Gastropoda
- Superorder: Ringiculimorpha
- Family: Ringiculidae
- Genus: Ringiculoides
- Species: R. kurilensis

Binomial name
- Ringiculoides kurilensis Minichev, 1966

= Ringiculoides kurilensis =

Species of gastropod

Ringiculoides kurilensis is a species of small sea snail, a marine gastropod mollusk in the family Ringiculidae.

== Distribution ==
This species occurs in the western North Pacific.
