= Microglyphis angulata =

Scientific classification
- Kingdom: Animalia
- Phylum: Mollusca
- Class: Gastropoda
- Superorder: Ringiculimorpha
- Family: Ringiculidae
- Genus: Microglyphis
- Species: †M. angulata

Binomial name
- †Microglyphis angulata Helwerda, 2015

Species of gastropod

Microglyphis angulata is an extinct species of sea snail, a marine gastropod mollusc in the family Ringiculidae.

== Distribution ==
Fossils of this marine species were found in Plio-Pleistocene strata of the Philippines.
