= Microglyphis furukawai =

Scientific classification
- Kingdom: Animalia
- Phylum: Mollusca
- Class: Gastropoda
- Superorder: Ringiculimorpha
- Family: Ringiculidae
- Genus: Microglyphis
- Species: M. furukawai

Binomial name
- Microglyphis furukawai Kuroda, 1961

Species of gastropod

Microglyphis furukawai is a species of sea snail, a marine gastropod mollusc in the family Ringiculidae.

== Distribution ==
This marine species occurs off Japan and in the bathyal zone of the Sea of Okhotsk.
