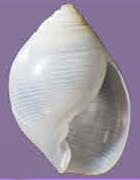
- Microglyphis japonica shell

Scientific classification
- Kingdom: Animalia
- Phylum: Mollusca
- Class: Gastropoda
- Superorder: Ringiculimorpha
- Family: Ringiculidae
- Genus: Microglyphis
- Species: M. japonica

Binomial name
- Microglyphis japonica (Habe, 1952)

Synonyms
- Hyporingicula japonica Habe, 1952; Microglyphis japonicus [sic] (incorrect gender ending); Microglyphis noguchii Kuroda, 1961

= Microglyphis japonica =

Species of gastropod

Microglyphis japonica is a species of sea snail, a marine gastropod mollusc in the family Ringiculidae.

== Distribution ==
This marine species occurs off Japan.
