= Microglyphis edgari =

Scientific classification
- Kingdom: Animalia
- Phylum: Mollusca
- Class: Gastropoda
- Superorder: Ringiculimorpha
- Family: Ringiculidae
- Genus: Microglyphis
- Species: M. edgari

Binomial name
- Microglyphis edgari Poppe, 2025

Species of gastropod

Microglyphis edgari is a species of sea snail, a marine gastropod mollusc in the family Ringiculidae.

== Distribution ==
This marine species occurs in the South China Sea off Taiwan.
