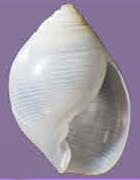
- Microglyphis japonica

Scientific classification
- Kingdom: Animalia
- Phylum: Mollusca
- Class: Gastropoda
- Superorder: Ringiculimorpha
- Family: Ringiculidae
- Genus: Microglyphis; Dall, 1902

Synonyms
- Actaeon (Microglyphis) Dall, 1902 superseded rank; Acteon (Microglyphis) Dall, 1902 superseded rank; Hyporingicula Habe, 1952 junior subjective synonym

= Microglyphis =

Genus of sea snails

Microglyphis is a genus of gastropods belonging to the family Ringiculidae.

Members of this species have thin shells. The ribs on the shell are wider than Ringicula, but the shell lack a thickly callused aperture. The shell does not have posterior nor anterior notches.

== Distribution ==
The species of this genus are found in East and Northwest Pacific Ocean.

== Species ==
- † Microglyphis angulata Helwerda, 2015
- Microglyphis brevicula (Dall, 1902)
- Microglyphis curtula (Dall, 1890)
- Microglyphis edgari Poppe, 2025
- Microglyphis furukawai Kuroda, 1961
- Microglyphis globularis (E.A.Smith, 1875)
- Microglyphis hasegawai Chaban, Kano, Fukumori & Chernyshev, 2018
- Microglyphis japonica (Habe, 1952)
- Microglyphis mazatlanica (Dall, 1908)
- Microglyphis michelleae Valdés, 2019
- † Microglyphis miranda Lozouet, 1999
- Microglyphis perconica (Dall, 1890)
- Microglyphis sabrinae Valdés, 2019

Synonyms

- Microglyphis breviculus [sic]: synonym of Microglyphis brevicula (Dall, 1902) (incorrect gender ending)
- Microglyphis estuarina (Dall, 1908): synonym of Microglyphis brevicula (Dall, 1902) (junior subjective synonym)
- Microglyphis estuarinus [sic]: synonym of Microglyphis estuarina (Dall, 1908) : synonym of Microglyphis brevicula (Dall, 1902) (incorrect gender ending)
- Microglyphis japonicus [sic]: synonym of Microglyphis japonica (Habe, 1952) (incorrect gender ending)
- Microglyphis mazatlanicus [sic]: synonym of Microglyphis mazatlanica (Dall, 1908) (incorrect gender ending)
- † Microglyphis mirandus Lozouet, 1999 : synonym of † Microglyphis miranda Lozouet, 1999 † (wrong gender agreement of specific epithet)
- Microglyphis noguchii Kuroda, 1961: synonym of Microglyphis japonica (Habe, 1952)
- Microglyphis perconicus [sic]: synonym of Microglyphis perconica (Dall, 1890) (incorrect gender ending)
