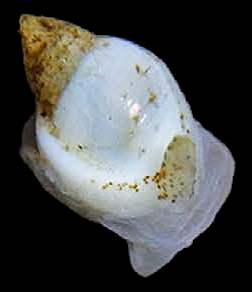
- Ringicula doliaris
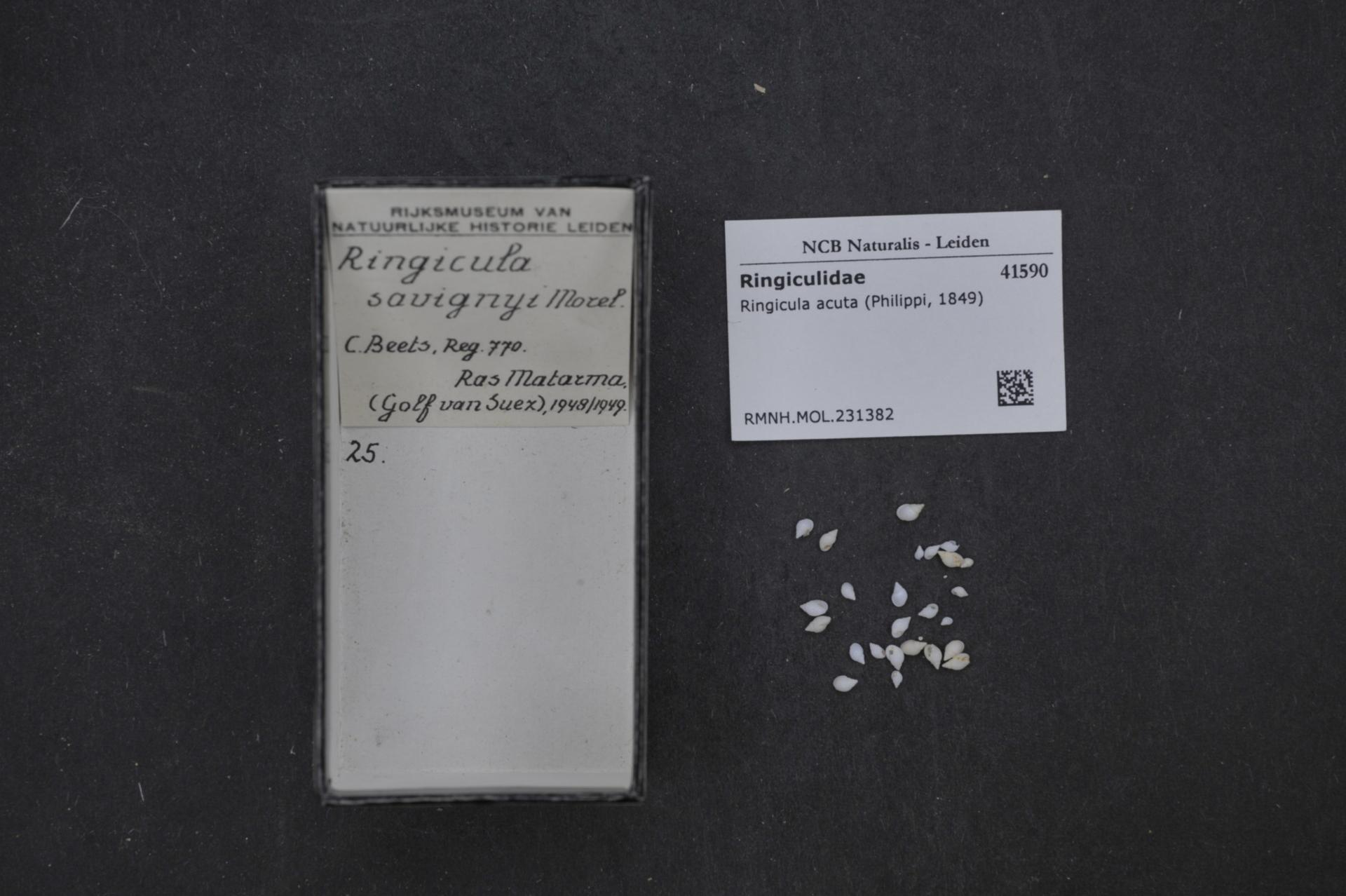
- Ringicula acuta shells

Scientific classification
- Kingdom: Animalia
- Phylum: Mollusca
- Class: Gastropoda
- Superorder: Ringiculimorpha
- Family: Ringiculidae
- Genus: Ringicula; Deshayes, 1838

Type species
- Marginella auriculata Ménard de la Groye, 1811

Synonyms
- List: Plicatra F. Nordsieck, 1972; Ringactaeon F. Nordsieck, 1972; Ringicla [sic] (misspelling); Ringicula (Ringicula) Deshayes, 1838; † Ringicula (Ringiculella) Sacco, 1892 (junior subjective synonym); Ringicula (Ringiculina) Monterosato, 1884; † Ringicula (Ringiculopspongia) Sacco, 1892 alternative representation; Ringiculadda Iredale, 1936; Ringiculina Monterosato, 1884

= Ringicula =

Genus of gastropods

Ringicula is a genus of small deepwater sea snails, marine gastropod molluscs or micromolluscs belonging to the family Ringiculidae. Members of the species have a solid shell. The shell has anterior notch and a thick lip.

== Species ==
The following species are included within the genus Ringicula:

- Ringicula abbreviata G. Nevill & H. Nevill, 1875
- Ringicula abyssicola Brazier, 1877
- Ringicula acuta R. A. Philippi, 1849 ( unreplaced junior homonym, invalid; not Forbes, 1846)
- Ringicula aethiopica E. von Martens, 1902
- Ringicula alabamensis Aldrich, 1897 †
- Ringicula altocanalis Dell, 1952 †
- Ringicula amoena Thiele, 1925
- Ringicula anfractolineata Stephenson, 1941 †
- Ringicula apicata G. Nevill & H. Nevill, 1871
- Ringicula arctata Gould, 1860
- Ringicula arctatoides K. Martin, 1879 †
- Ringicula assularum R. B. Watson, 1883
- Ringicula auriculata (Ménard de la Groye, 1811)
- Ringicula australis Hinds, 1844
- Ringicula bella Helwerda, 2015 †
- Ringicula blanchardi Dautzenberg & H. Fischer, 1896
- Ringicula bonneti Cossmann, 1900 †
- Ringicula buccinea (Brocchi, 1814) †
- Ringicula cabrai Morlet, 1882
- Ringicula caelestis Helwerda, 2015 †
- Ringicula caledonica Morlet, 1880
- Ringicula caron Hinds, 1844
- Ringicula castigata Marwick, 1926 †
- Ringicula ciommeii Mariottini, Smriglio & Oliverio, 2000
- Ringicula circumscripta Helwerda, 2015 †
- Ringicula conformis Monterosato, 1877
- Ringicula congoensis Thiele, 1925
- Ringicula corneti Marlière, 1939 †
- Ringicula cossmanni Morlet, 1880 †
- Ringicula costata (Eichwald, 1830) †
- Ringicula crassidens Gofas & Luque, 2021
- Ringicula delecta Murdoch & Suter, 1906
- Ringicula denticulata Gould, 1860
- Ringicula dijki K. Martin, 1884 †
- Ringicula doliaris Gould, 1860
- Ringicula dominicana Maury, 1917 †
- Ringicula douvillei Morlet, 1880 †
- Ringicula dugasti Morlet, 1880 †
- Ringicula fossulata de Folin, 1867
- Ringicula gianninii F. Nordsieck, 1974
- Ringicula glabra K. Martin, 1884 †
- Ringicula gouldi Robba, Di Geronimo, Chaimanee, Negri & Sanfilippo, 2004
- Ringicula grandinosa Hinds, 1844
- Ringicula hardingi Cotton & Godfrey, 1933
- Ringicula herouvalensis Morlet, 1882 †
- Ringicula incisa Hedley, 1899
- Ringicula janae T. Cossignani & Lorenz, 2021
- Ringicula jucunda Thiele, 1925
- Ringicula kurodai Takeyama, 1935
- Ringicula lactea R. M. Johnston, 1880 †
- Ringicula laevigata (Eichwald, 1830) †
- Ringicula langlassei Morlet, 1882 †
- Ringicula lata (Conrad, 1865) †
- Ringicula leptocheila Brugnone, 1873 †
- Ringicula lignitarum Cossmann, 1902 †
- Ringicula mammosa K. Martin, 1931 †
- Ringicula mariei Morlet, 1880
- Ringicula martini Koperberg, 1931 †
- Ringicula marwicki Powell, 1935 †
- Ringicula minichevi Chaban, Kano, Fukumori & Chernyshev, 2018
- Ringicula minor (Grateloup, 1838) †
- Ringicula minuta H. Adams, 1872
- Ringicula minutula Locard, 1897
- Ringicula ngatapa Marwick, 1931 †
- Ringicula niinoi Nomura, 1939
- Ringicula nitida A. E. Verrill, 1872
- Ringicula noumeensis Morlet, 1880
- Ringicula obesior Marwick, 1931 †
- Ringicula okadai Habe, 1956
- Ringicula opima Helwerda, 2015 †
- Ringicula orientalis G.-Y. Lin, 1985
- Ringicula orientalis Thiele, 1925
- Ringicula parvula Hedley, 1899
- Ringicula peracuta R. B. Watson, 1883
- Ringicula pilula Habe, 1950
- Ringicula pirulina Locard, 1897
- Ringicula plicatula Thiele, 1925
- Ringicula plicifera Schepman, 1913
- Ringicula praelonga Cossmann, 1897 †
- Ringicula prismatica de Folin, 1868
- Ringicula promarginata Sacco, 1892 †
- Ringicula propinquans Hinds, 1844
- Ringicula pusilla R. B. Watson, 1883
- Ringicula pygmaea K. Martin, 1884 †
- Ringicula raincourti Morlet, 1880 †
- Ringicula ravni Sorgenfrei, 1958 †
- Ringicula ringens (Lamarck, 1804) †
- Ringicula rosildae Rosso & Saubade, 1985 †
- Ringicula roussellae Rosso & Saubade, 1985 †
- Ringicula savignyi Morlet, 1878
- Ringicula semisculpta Hedley, 1910
- Ringicula semistriata d'Orbigny, 1842
- Ringicula senegalensis Morlet, 1882
- Ringicula seriaensis Beets, 1986 †
- Ringicula shenzhenensis G.-Y. Lin & Z.-Y. Qi, 1986
- Ringicula siberutensis Thiele, 1925
- Ringicula similis Thiele, 1925
- Ringicula soa Bozzetti, 2009
- Ringicula striata (R. A. Philippi, 1843) †
- Ringicula suavis Thiele, 1925
- Ringicula subglobosa Guzhov, 2022 †
- Ringicula sumatrana Thiele, 1925
- Ringicula suturalis E. A. Smith, 1872
- Ringicula takeyamai Habe, 1950
- Ringicula tatei Cossmann, 1897 †
- Ringicula tenuilabrum P. A. Maxwell, 1992 †
- Ringicula tenuilirata Cossmann, 1897 †
- Ringicula teramachii Habe, 1950
- Ringicula tiedemanni Gürs, 1996 †
- Ringicula titanica Schepman, 1913
- Ringicula torquata Marwick, 1926 †
- Ringicula tosaensis Habe, 1950
- Ringicula truncata G. B. Sowerby III, 1915
- Ringicula turrita K. Martin, 1884 †
- Ringicula turtoni Bartsch, 1915
- Ringicula tutamoensis Marwick, 1931 †
- Ringicula uniplicata Hutton, 1885 †
- Ringicula ventricosa (J. Sowerby, 1824) †
- Ringicula yokoyamai Takeyama, 1935
- Ringicula zecorpulenta Laws, 1939 †

=== Former species ===
- Ringicula acutispira Turton, 1932 - synonymized with Auriculastra radiolata (Morelet, 1860)
- Ringicula africana Bartsch, 1915 - synonymized with Ringicula turtoni Bartsch, 1915
- Ringicula agulhasensis Thiele, 1925 - synonymized with Ringicula turtoni Bartsch, 1915
- Ringicula australis Crosse & P. Fischer, 1865 - synonymized with Ringicula australis Hinds, 1844
- Ringicula barashi Di Geronimo, 1975 - synonymized with Ringicula conformis Monterosato, 1877
- Ringicula bourguignati Rochebrune, 1883 - synonymized with Ringicula senegalensis Morlet, 1882
- †Ringicula cancellarioides Seguenza, 1881 - synonymized with †Ringicula costata costata (Eichwald, 1830)
- Ringicula cruzensis Nowell-Usticke, 1969 - synonymized with Coralliophila salebrosa H. Adams & A. Adams, 1864
- Ringicula doliaris Takeyama, 1935 - synonymized with Ringicula niinoi Nomura, 1939
- Ringicula foveolata Yokoyama, 1928 - synonymized with Ringiculopsis foveolata (Yokoyama, 1928)
- †Ringicula gaudryana Morlet, 1878 - synonymized with †Ringicula ventricosa (J. Sowerby, 1824)
- Ringicula hypograpta Brown & Pilsbry, 1913 - synonymized with Ringicula semistriata d'Orbigny, 1842
- Ringicula leptocheila Brugnone, 1873 - synonymized with Ringicula gianninii Nordsieck, 1974
- Ringicula moritzi de Folin, 1870 - synonymized with Ringicula conformis Monterosato, 1877
- Ringicula musashiensis Yokoyama, 1920 - synonymized with Ringicula doliaris Gould, 1860
- Ringicula oehlertiana Morelet, 1880 - synonymized with Ringicula doliaris Gould, 1860
- †Ringicula ovalis Bell, 1898 - synonymized with †Ringicula buccinea (Brocchi, 1814)
- Ringicula peracuta Watson, 1883 - synonymized with Ringicula nitida A. E. Verrill, 1872
- †Ringicula placentina Seguenza, 1881 - synonymized with †Ringicula ventricosa (J. Sowerby, 1824)
- Ringicula pulchella Morlet, 1880 - synonymized with Ringicula blanchardi Dautzenberg & H. Fischer, 1896
- Ringicula scalaris W. H. Turton, 1932 - synonymized with Ringicula turtoni Bartsch, 1915
- †Ringicula searlesi Harmer, 1923 - synonymized with †Ringicula buccinea (Brocchi, 1814)
- Ringicula solida W. H. Turton, 1932 - synonymized with Ringicula turtoni Bartsch, 1915
- Ringicula someri de Folin, 1867 - synonymized with Ringicula conformis Monterosato, 1877
- Ringicula tridentata Guppy, 1873 - synonymized with Ringicula semistriata d'Orbigny, 1842
