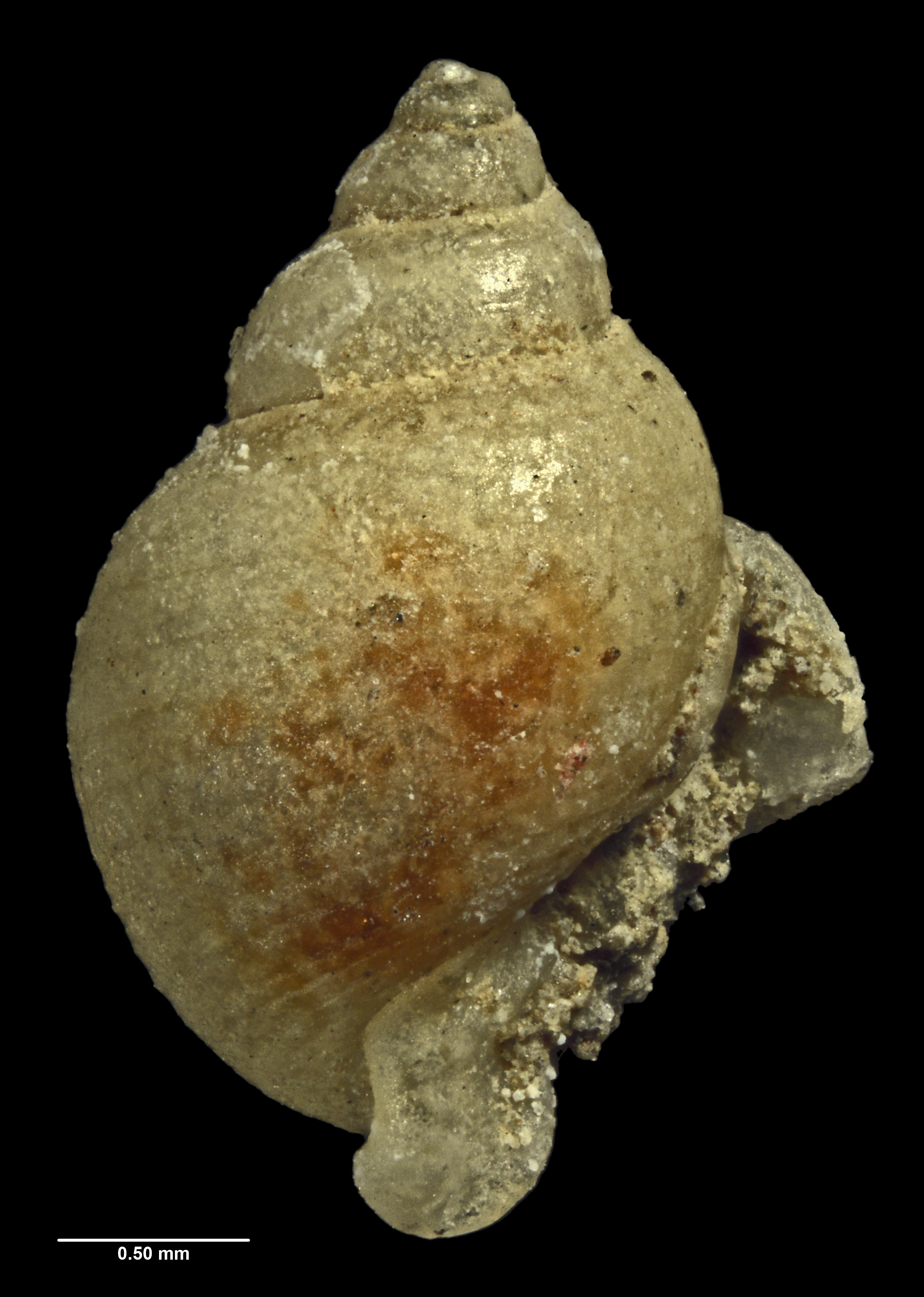
- Holotype from Auckland War Memorial Museum

Scientific classification
- Kingdom: Animalia
- Phylum: Mollusca
- Class: Gastropoda
- Superorder: Ringiculimorpha
- Family: Ringiculidae
- Genus: Ringicula
- Species: †R. marwicki

Binomial name
- †Ringicula marwicki A. W. B. Powell, 1935

= Ringicula marwicki =

Ringicula marwicki Temporal range: early Miocene

Extinct species of gastropod

Ringicula marwicki is an extinct species of sea snail, a marine gastropod mollusc, in the family Ringiculidae. Fossils of the species date to early Miocene strata of the west coast of the Auckland Region, New Zealand.

== Description ==
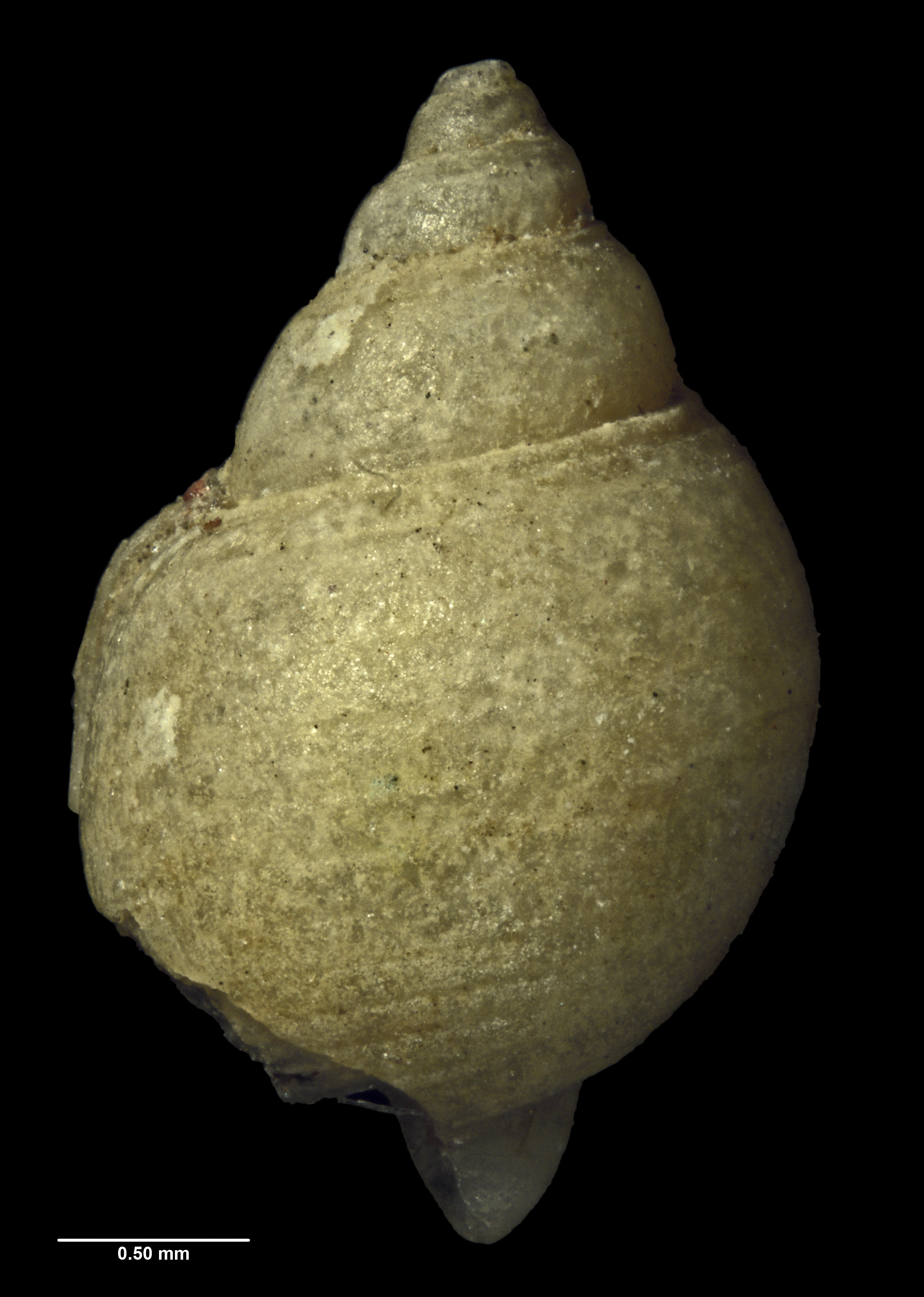
Reverse view of holotype

In the original description, Powell described the species as follows:

Shell small, ovate, solid. Body-whorl inflated. Spire narrowly conical, about two-thirds height of aperture. Whorls 4 1/2, including a small, smooth, dome-shaped protoconch of about 1 1/2 whorls, the tip flattened and slightly tilted. Suture impressed and bordered below by a fairly strong groove. Spire whorls smooth, body-whorl sculptured with about 16 incised lines, five of them being between the sutures. Outer lip broken away below, but, by the remaining upper portion, it is shown to be strongly variced. Parietal wall with a strong fold and two more, equally strong, on the columella.

The holotype of the species measures 3 mm (0.12 in) in height and 2 mm (0.079 in) in diameter. The species is morphologically similar to R. torquata, but can be identified due to R. marwicki being smaller, having a less broadly conic spire and stronger subsutural border.

== Taxonomy ==
The species was first described by A. W. B. Powell in 1935. The holotype was collected at an unknown date prior to 1935 from Te Waharoa Bay, south of Muriwai, Auckland Region (then more commonly known as Motutara), and is held in the collections of Auckland War Memorial Museum.

== Distribution ==
This extinct marine species occurs in early Miocene strata of the Tirikohua Formation of New Zealand, on the west coast of the Waitākere Ranges of the Auckland Region, New Zealand.
