= Ringicula blanchardi =

Scientific classification
- Kingdom: Animalia
- Phylum: Mollusca
- Class: Gastropoda
- Superorder: Ringiculimorpha
- Family: Ringiculidae
- Genus: Ringicula
- Species: R. blanchardi

Binomial name
- Ringicula blanchardi Dautzenberg & H. Fischer, 1896

Synonyms
- Ringicula pulchella Morlet, 1880

Species of gastropod

Ringicula blanchardi is a species of sea snail, a marine gastropod mollusk in the family Ringiculidae.
