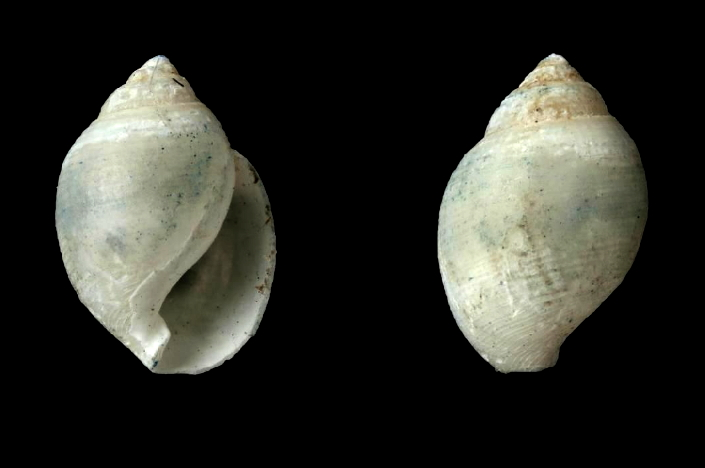
- Shell of Microglyphis globularis (specimen at the Natural History Museum, London)

Scientific classification
- Kingdom: Animalia
- Phylum: Mollusca
- Class: Gastropoda
- Superorder: Ringiculimorpha
- Family: Ringiculidae
- Genus: Microglyphis
- Species: M. globularis

Binomial name
- Microglyphis globularis (E.A. Smith, 1875)

Synonyms
- Admete globularis Smith, E.A., 1875

= Microglyphis globularis =

Species of gastropod

Microglyphis globularis is a species of sea snail, a marine gastropod mollusk in the family Ringiculidae.

== Description ==
The length of the shell attains 4 mm, its diameter 2 mm.

(Original description in Latin) The shell is small, globular, and thin, with a snow-white coloration. It consists of four and a half whorls; the first three are small and slightly convex, separated by a lightly channeled suture, while the body whorl is large and globose. All the whorls are sculpted with very fine spiral grooves.

The aperture is somewhat large and sub-pyriform, equaling nearly two-thirds of the total length of the shell. The columella is covered by a thin, wide callus that extends above the whorl, and it is obliquely truncated toward the base. The outer lip is thin and simple.

== Distribution ==
This marine species occurs off Japan.
