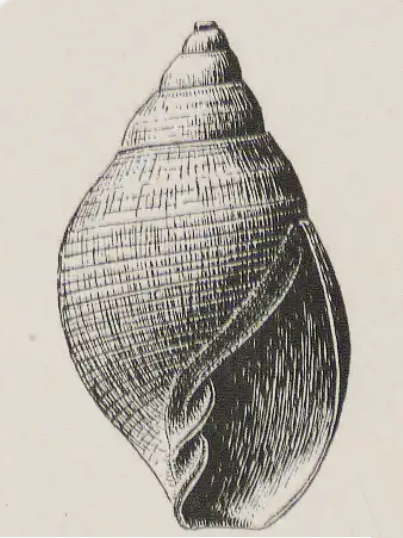
- Shell of Microglyphis mazatlanica (holotype)

Scientific classification
- Kingdom: Animalia
- Phylum: Mollusca
- Class: Gastropoda
- Superorder: Ringiculimorpha
- Family: Ringiculidae
- Genus: Microglyphis
- Species: M. mazatlanica

Binomial name
- Microglyphis mazatlanica (Dall, 1908)

Synonyms
- Acteon (Microglyphis) mazatlanicus Dall, 1908 superseded combination; Microglyphis mazatlanicus [sic] (incorrect gender ending)

= Microglyphis mazatlanica =

Species of gastropod

Microglyphis mazatlanica is a species of sea snail, a marine gastropod mollusc in the family Ringiculidae.

== Description ==
The holotype measures 5.5 mm in total length, with a spire length of 2.3 mm and a maximum diameter of 3.0 mm.

(Original description) The shell is small, polished, and white with an acute profile, consisting of five whorls. The spire is notably shorter than the aperture. The protoconch is glassy and small, possessing a sinistral orientation that is mostly immersed in the succeeding whorl. The suture is distinct, being neither channeled nor appressed. While the early whorls are moderately rounded and either smooth or marked by extremely faint traces of spiral striation, the body whorl is obscurely angulated at the shoulder. Above this angulation, the whorl slopes flatly toward the suture, while the remainder of the whorl is evenly and ovately rounded.

The sculpture consists of extremely fine, sharp, and close-set spiral striae that show a tendency to occur in pairs. These striae are slightly less crowded behind the shoulder and become more crowded on the base near the columella. They are crossed by faint, irregularly distributed, and slightly raised growth lines, and they exhibit more or less microscopic punctations. The periostracum is imperceptible.

The outer lip is thin, simple, and sharp; it is slightly patulous toward the middle and recedes near the suture. The columella is arcuate and obliquely truncated, bearing two strong spiral plaits. The anterior plait is situated on the edge of the truncation and is continuous with a distinct notch at the end of the columella, around which it passes imperceptibly into the margin of the lip. The body of the shell is covered with a faint wash of callus, and the base is imperforate.

== Distribution ==
This species occurs off the Pacific coast of Mexico.
