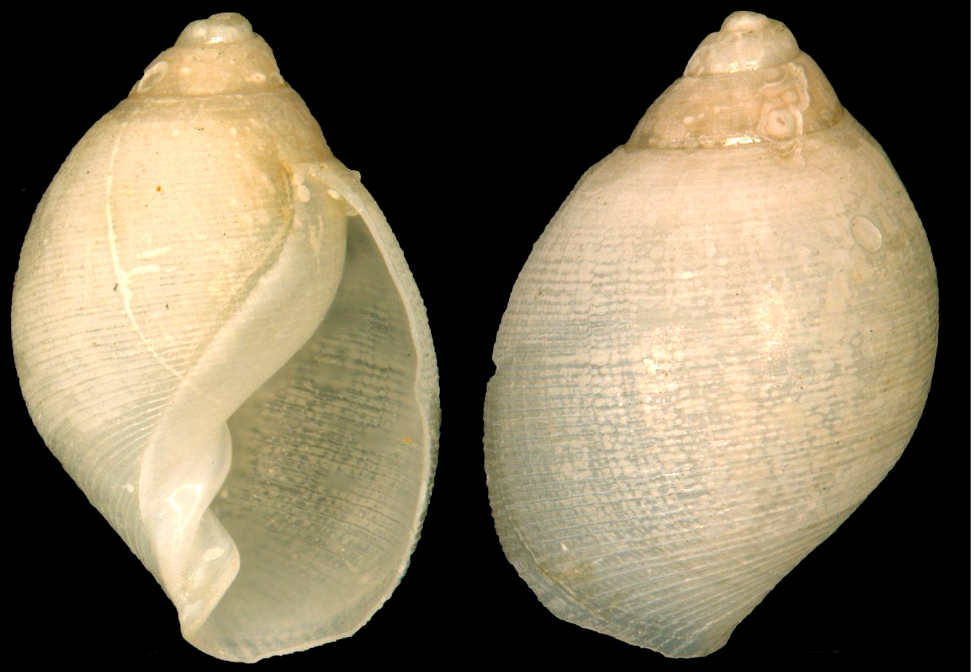
- Microglyphis brevicula shell specimen at the Denver Museum of Nature & Science)

Scientific classification
- Kingdom: Animalia
- Phylum: Mollusca
- Class: Gastropoda
- Superorder: Ringiculimorpha
- Family: Ringiculidae
- Genus: Microglyphis
- Species: M. brevicula

Binomial name
- Microglyphis brevicula (Dall, 1902)

Synonyms
- Actaeon (Microglyphis) breviculus Dall, 1902 superseded combination; Actaeon (Microglyphis) estuarinus Dall, 1908 junior subjective synonym; † Actaeon (Microglyphis) schencki S. S. Berry, 1941 (junior synonym); Acteon (Microglyphis) estuarinus Dall, 1908 junior subjective synonym; Microglyphis breviculus [sic] (incorrect gender ending); Microglyphis estuarina (Dall, 1908) junior subjective synonym; Microglyphis estuarinus [sic] (incorrect gender ending)

= Microglyphis brevicula =

Species of gastropod

Microglyphis brevicula is a species of sea snail, a marine gastropod mollusc in the family Ringiculidae.

== Description ==
The holotype measures 3.6 mm in length and 2.25 mm in maximum diameter.

(Original description) The shell is small, short, and plump, possessing a yellowish-white coloration and four and a half polished whorls. Although the protoconch is sinistral, it is wholly immersed, which gives the smooth apex the appearance of being dextral. The whorls are convex and increase rapidly in size, separated by a deep, almost channeled, and very narrow suture.

The sculpture consists of extremely faint, fine spiral striae that are nearly absent in front of the suture but grow more distinct anteriorly, showing no visible punctations. The aperture is ample, and the outer lip is simple. The body of the shell features a well-marked callus that continues onto the columella and spreads slightly over the base. The columella itself is concavely arcuate, with its anterior edge thickened and expanded into a strong spiral plait or lamina; a second, less prominent plait is situated behind this on the columella. A small but distinct notch is present in front of the columella.

== Distribution ==
The holotype of this marine species was found off Santa Rosa Island, California. It occurs from the Gulf of Alaska to San Diego, California.
