= Microglyphis michelleae =

Scientific classification
- Kingdom: Animalia
- Phylum: Mollusca
- Class: Gastropoda
- Superorder: Ringiculimorpha
- Family: Ringiculidae
- Genus: Microglyphis
- Species: M. michelleae

Binomial name
- Microglyphis michelleae Á. Valdés, 2019

Species of gastropod

Microglyphis michelleae is a species of sea snail, a marine gastropod mollusc in the family Ringiculidae.

== Description ==
The length of the shell attains 2.5 mm.

== Distribution ==
This marine species occurs off Point Arguello, California, USA.
