= Microglyphis hasegawai =

Scientific classification
- Kingdom: Animalia
- Phylum: Mollusca
- Class: Gastropoda
- Superorder: Ringiculimorpha
- Family: Ringiculidae
- Genus: Microglyphis
- Species: M. hasegawai

Binomial name
- Microglyphis hasegawai Chaban, Kano, Fukumori & Chernyshev, 2018

Species of gastropod

Microglyphis hasegawai is a species of sea snail, a marine gastropod mollusc in the family Ringiculidae.

== Distribution ==
This marine species occurs off Honshu Island, Japan and in the eurybathic zone (living across a wide range of depths in the water column) of the Sea of Okhotsk.
