= Microglyphis miranda =

Scientific classification
- Kingdom: Animalia
- Phylum: Mollusca
- Class: Gastropoda
- Superorder: Ringiculimorpha
- Family: Ringiculidae
- Genus: Microglyphis
- Species: †M. miranda

Binomial name
- †Microglyphis miranda Lozouet, 1999

Synonyms
- † Microglyphis mirandus Lozouet, 1999 (wrong gender agreement of specific epithet)

Species of gastropod

Microglyphis miranda is an extinct species of sea snail, a marine gastropod mollusc in the family Ringiculidae.

== Distribution ==
Fossils of this marine species were found in Aquitaine, France
