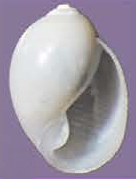
- Ringiculoides kurilensis shell

Scientific classification
- Kingdom: Animalia
- Phylum: Mollusca
- Class: Gastropoda
- Superorder: Ringiculimorpha
- Family: Ringiculidae
- Genus: Ringiculoides; Minichev, 1966

Type species
- Ringiculoides kurilensis Minichev, 1966

= Ringiculoides =

Genus of gastropods

Ringiculoides is a genus of small sea snails, marine gastropod molluscs in the family Ringiculidae.

== Species ==
Species accepted as of May 2025:

- Ringiculoides kurilensis Minichev, 1966
- Ringiculoides vityazi Chaban, Kano, Fukumori & Chernyshev, 2018
