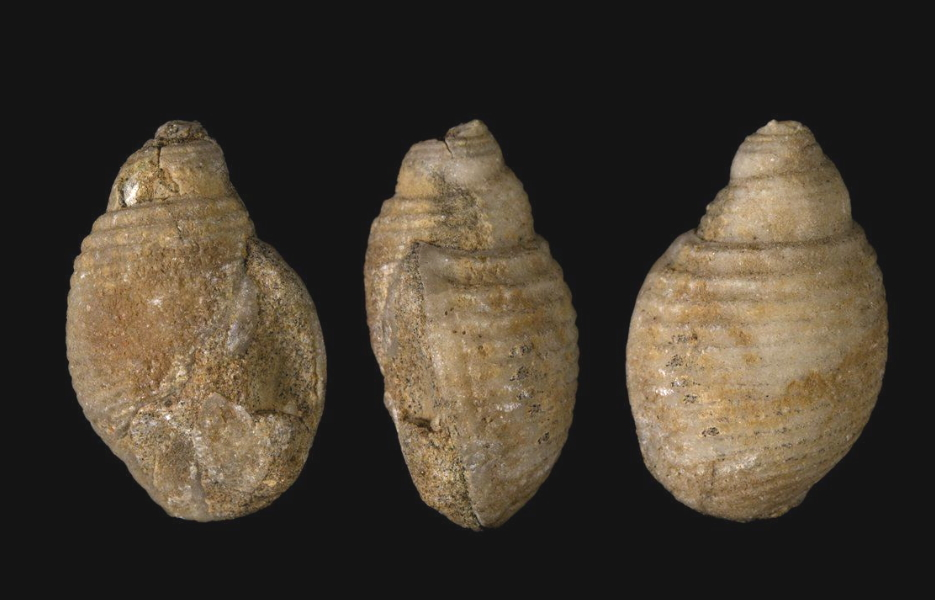
- Shell of Microglyphis curtula (iconotype at MNHN, Paris)

Scientific classification
- Kingdom: Animalia
- Phylum: Mollusca
- Class: Gastropoda
- Superorder: Ringiculimorpha
- Superfamily: Ringiculoidea
- Family: Ringiculidae
- Genus: Microglyphis
- Species: M. curtula

Binomial name
- Microglyphis curtula (Dall, 1890)
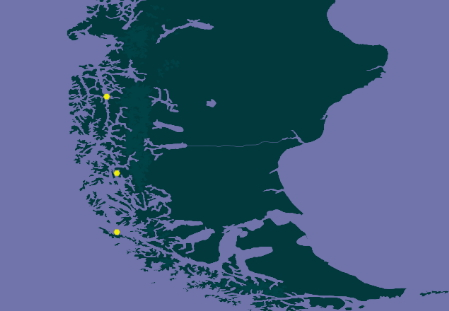

Synonyms
- Actaeon curtulus Dall, 1890 (original combination)

= Microglyphis curtula =

Species of gastropod

Microglyphis curtula is a species of sea snail, a marine gastropod mollusk in the family Ringiculidae.

== Description ==
The length of the shell attains 3 mm, its diameter 2 mm.

The small shell is short and subglobular. It is white and not polished. The surface is covered with sharp, deep, close set, spiral grooves minutely punctate at the bottom. The shell contains three whorls, beside the prominent, polished, smooth, globular, sinistral protoconch. The suture is distinct and not channelled. The outer lip is thin and simple. The body of the shell shows a thin wash of callus. The columella is short, thin, very much twisted, so that its outer edge presents a plait-like appearance, while the shell seems almost canaliculate, though the columella is continuous with the basal margin. Above the twisted edge and separated from it by a deep channel is a second less prominent plait.

== Distribution ==
This marine species occurs off Chile.
