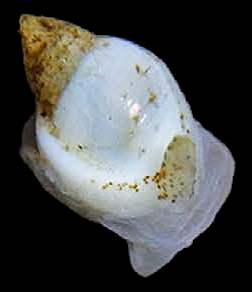
- dorsal view of a live Ringicula doliaris

Scientific classification
- Kingdom: Animalia
- Phylum: Mollusca
- Class: Gastropoda
- Superorder: Ringiculimorpha
- Family: Ringiculidae
- Genus: Ringicula
- Species: R. doliaris

Binomial name
- Ringicula doliaris Gould, 1860

= Ringicula doliaris =

Species of gastropod

Ringicula doliaris is a species of sea snail, a marine gastropod mollusc in the family Ringiculidae.

== Distribution ==
Japan.

== Description ==
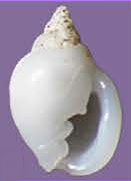
Ringicula doliaris shell.

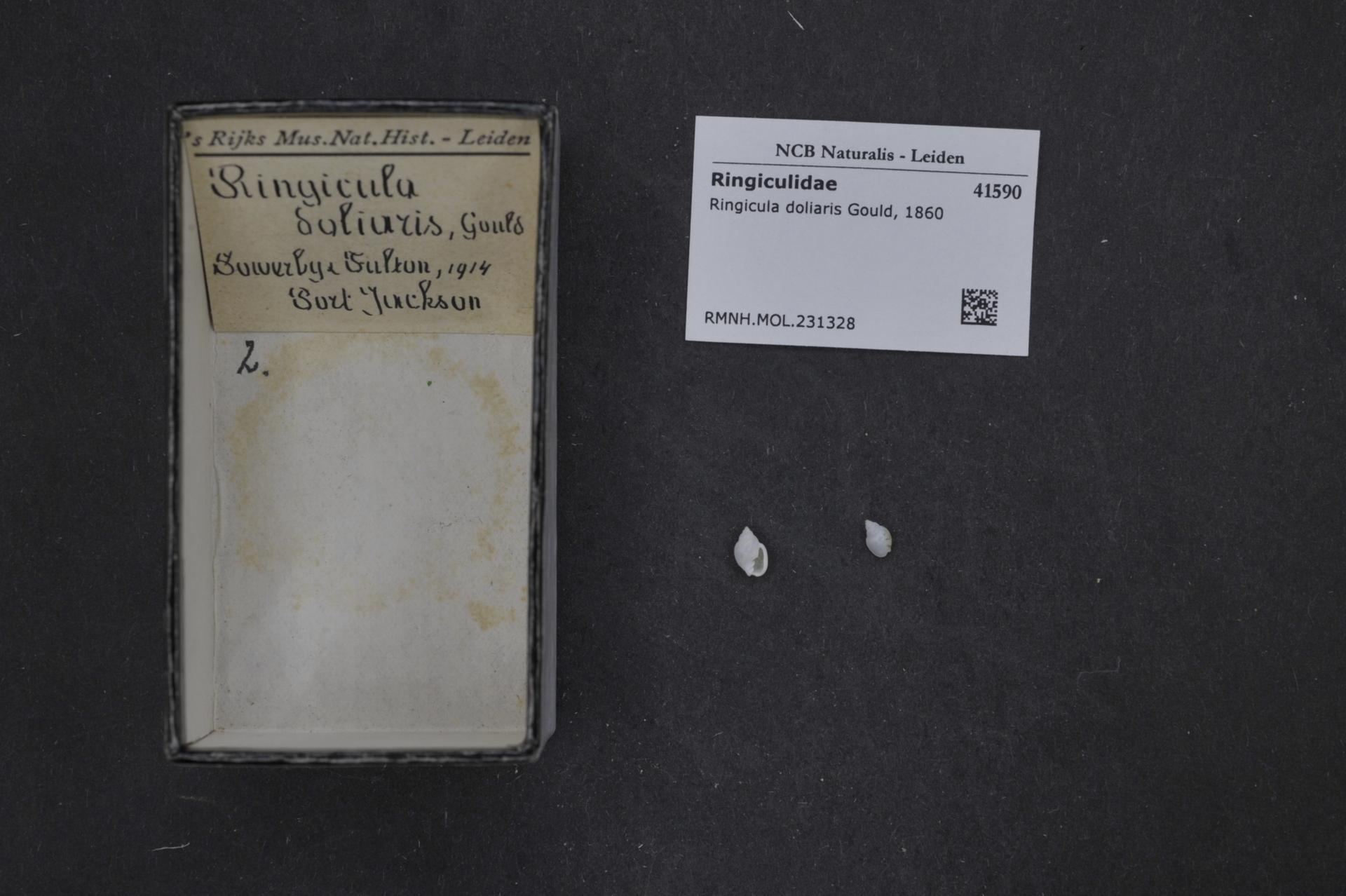
Ringicula doliaris shells.
