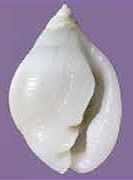
- Ringiculopsis foveolata shell

Scientific classification
- Kingdom: Animalia
- Phylum: Mollusca
- Class: Gastropoda
- Superorder: Ringiculimorpha
- Family: Ringiculidae
- Genus: Ringiculopsis; Chavan, 1947
- Species: R. foveolata

Binomial name
- Ringiculopsis foveolata (Yokoyama, 1928)

Synonyms
- Ringicula foveolata Yokoyama, 1928; Ringiculopsis nipponica (Kuroda, 1961); Ringiculospongia nipponica Kuroda, 1961

= Ringiculopsis =

Species of gastropod

Ringiculopsis foveolata is a species of small sea snail, a marine gastropod mollusk in the family Ringiculidae. It is the only species in the genus Ringiculopsis.
