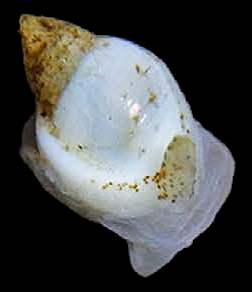
- a live Ringicula doliaris
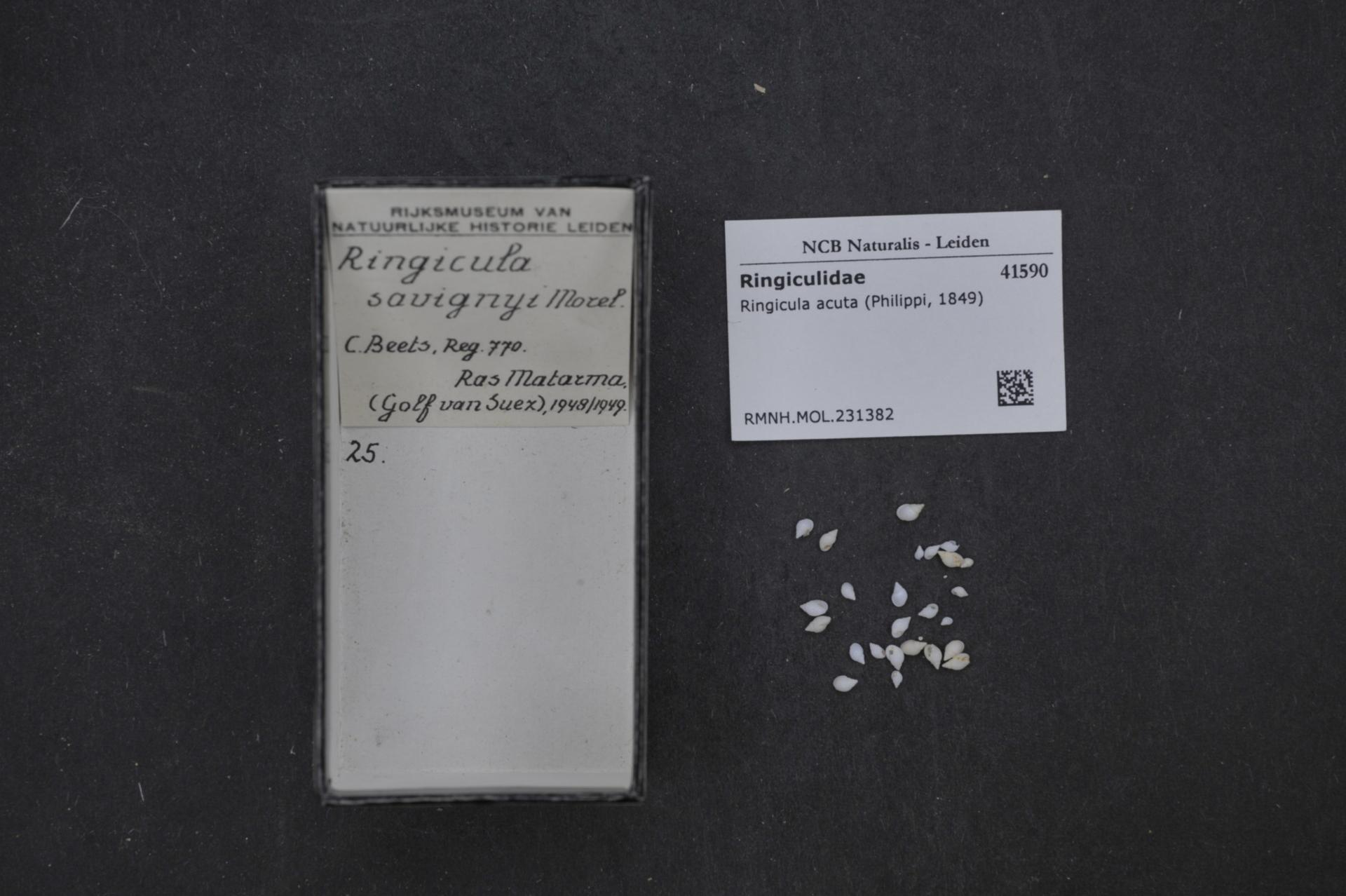
- Ringicula acuta shells

Scientific classification
- Kingdom: Animalia
- Phylum: Mollusca
- Class: Gastropoda
- Subclass: Heterobranchia
- Infraclass: Euthyneura
- Subterclass: Ringipleura
- Superorder: Ringiculimorpha
- Superfamily: Ringiculoidea
- Family: Ringiculidae; Philippi, 1853

Type genus
- Ringicula Deshayes, 1838

= Ringiculidae =

Family of gastropods

Ringiculidae are a family of small deep water sea snails, marine gastropod mollusks or micromollusks in the informal group Lower Heterobranchia.

Ringiculidae is the only family within the superfamily Ringiculoidea.

The shells of species in this family superficially resemble minute versions of the shells of the Cassinae.

== Characteristics ==
(Original description in German) The shell is generally spherical, though in rare cases, it can be an elongated oval shape. Its aperture is crescent-shaped and lacks both a siphonal canal and a notch. The outer lip is typically thickened and reflected, while the columella is folded. This family is distinguished from Marginella and related genera by the absence of a notch at the base of the aperture; it differs from the Bullidae by its thickened outer lip.

== Genera ==
Genera in the family Ringiculidae include:

- † Avellana d'Orbigny, 1842
- † Biplica Popenoe, 1957
- † Eriptycha F. B. Meek, 1876
- † Gilbertina Morlet, 1888
- Microglyphis Dall, 1902
- † Oligoptycha F. B. Meek, 1876
- Pseudoringicula Lin, 1980
- Ringicula Deshayes, 1838
- † Ringiculocosta Sacco, 1892
- Ringiculoides Minichev, 1966
- Ringiculopsis Chavan, 1947
- Ringiculospongia Sacco, 1892
- † Ringinella A. d'Orbigny, 1842
- † Superstes H. J. Finlay & Marwick, 1937

Genera brought into synonymy

- † Eryptycha [sic]: synonym of † Eriptycha F. B. Meek, 1876 (misspelling - incorrect subsequent spelling)
- † Euptycha [sic] : synonym of † Eriptycha F. B. Meek, 1876 (misspelling - incorrect subsequent spelling)
- † Gilbertia Cossmann, 1889: synonym of † Gilbertina Morlet, 1888 (unjustified emendation)
- Hyporingicula Habe, 1952: synonym of Microglyphis Dall, 1902
- Plicatra F. Nordsieck, 1972: synonym of Ringicula Deshayes, 1838
- Ringactaeon F. Nordsieck, 1972: synonym of Ringicula Deshayes, 1838
- Ringiculadda Iredale, 1936: synonym of Ringiculina Monterosato, 1884: synonym of Ringicula (Ringiculina) Monterosato, 1884 represented as Ringicula Deshayes, 1838
- Ringiculina Monterosato, 1884: synonym of Ringicula Deshayes, 1838
