= Acteon candens =

Scientific classification
- Kingdom: Animalia
- Phylum: Mollusca
- Class: Gastropoda
- Superfamily: Acteonoidea
- Family: Acteonidae
- Genus: Acteon
- Species: A. candens

Binomial name
- Acteon candens Rehder, 1939

Species of marine gastropod

Acteon candens, common name Rehder's baby bubble, is a species of sea snail, a marine gastropod mollusc in the family Acteonidae. This species is similar to Acteon punctostriatus.

== Description ==
The length of the shell varies between 5 mm and 10 mm. Despite looking similar to Acteon punctostriatus, this snail is slightly larger, more solid, more glossy white, less conspictuous with the basal striation well marked but is posteriorly becoming more obscure generally not reaching the upper insertion of the lip. A few pale caramel colored bands may appear on the early whorl of the shell. It is opaque milk-white and has light orange suffusions on the body whorl. It doesn't have spiral grooves from the other ½ of the body whorl. Compared to Rictaxis punctostriatus, A. candens is more thicker-shelled than R. punctostriatus.

== Distribution ==
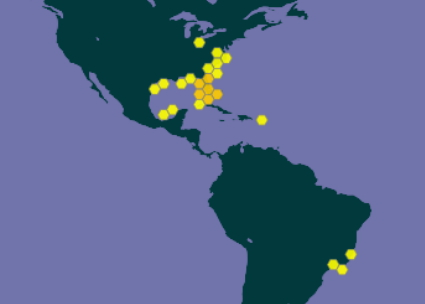
Distribution

This marine species occurs in the Western Atlantic Ocean off North Carolina; in the Caribbean Sea off Cuba.
