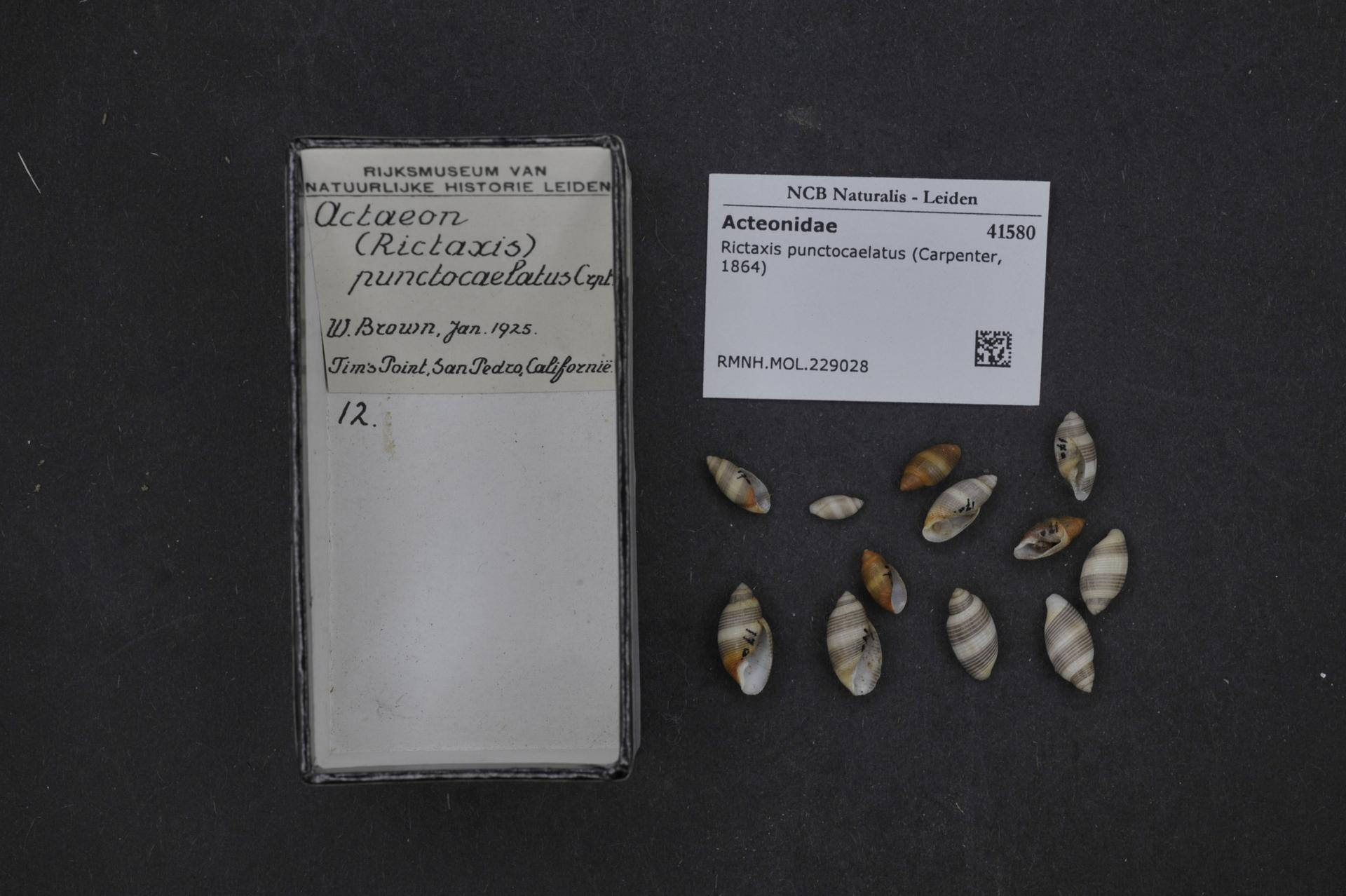
- Rictaxis punctocaelatus shells

Scientific classification
- Kingdom: Animalia
- Phylum: Mollusca
- Class: Gastropoda
- Family: Acteonidae
- Genus: Rictaxis; Dall, 1871

Synonyms
- Actaeon (Rictaxis) Dall, 1871 superseded rank; † Actaeonidea Gabb, 1873 junior subjective synonym; Acteon (Rictaxis) Dall, 1871 superseded rank

= Rictaxis =

Genus of gastropods

Rictaxis is a genus of minute sea snails or "bubble snails", marine gastropod mollusks or micromollusks in the family Acteonidae, the "barrel bubble" snails.

The genus name is derived from Latin words, meaning "open mouth", and "axis" referring to the columella.

== Species ==
Species within the genus Rictaxis include:

- † Rictaxis achatinus (Sacco, 1896)
- Rictaxis albus (G. B. Sowerb III, 1873) (synonym Acteon albus Sowerby, 1873)
- † Rictaxis austriacus Harzhauser, Landau & Malaquias, 2026
- † Rictaxis dactylinus (Deshayes, 1862)
- † Rictaxis munieri (Deshayes, 1862)
- Rictaxis painei (Dall, 1903)
- Rictaxis punctocaelatus (Carpenter, 1864)
- Rictaxis rarius Poppe & Tagaro, 2026
- Rictaxis sanguinea Valdès, 2008
- † Rictaxis selandicus (Ravn, 1933)
- † Rictaxis siedli Harzhauser, Landau & Malaquias, 2026
- † Rictaxis tornatus (Millet, 1854)
- † Rictaxis ursulae Harzhauser, Landau & Malaquias, 2026

Species that have been synonymized

- Rictaxis punctostriatus : synonym of Japonactaeon punctostriatus (C. B. Adams, 1840)
- Rictaxis albus (B. Sowerby III, 1874)
  - Distribution : South Africa. False Bay to KwaZulu-Natal 10 to 165m, endemic, mixed sand and rocky reef. Living animals have omly been collected from Algoa Bay.
  - Length : 10–21 mm
  - Description : white shell with numerous spiraling white to light brown grooves.
- Rictaxis painei Dall, 1903
  - Distribution : America
