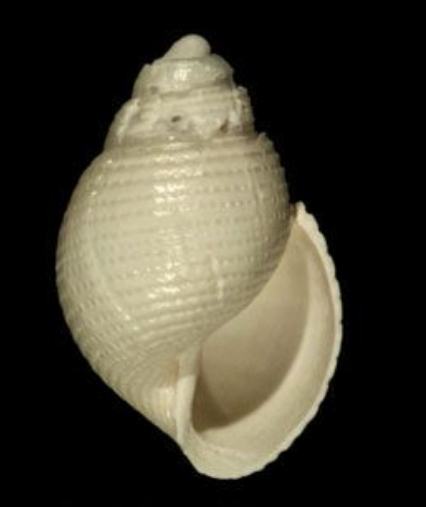
- Shell of Japonactaeon pusillus (specimen at the Natural History Museum, Rotterdam)

Scientific classification
- Kingdom: Animalia
- Phylum: Mollusca
- Class: Gastropoda
- Superfamily: Acteonoidea
- Family: Acteonidae
- Genus: Japonactaeon
- Species: J. pusillus

Binomial name
- Japonactaeon pusillus (Forbes, 1844)
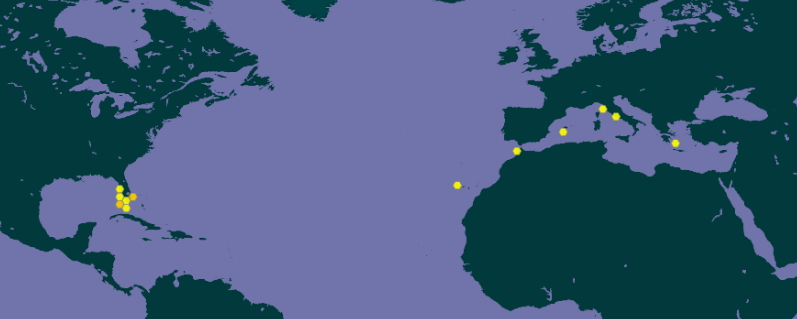

Synonyms
- Japonacteon pusillus [sic] (genus misspelling); Tornatella pusilla Forbes, 1844

= Japonactaeon pusillus =

Species of marine gastropod

Japonactaeon pusillus is a species of sea snail, a marine gastropod mollusc in the family Acteonidae.

== Description ==
The length of the shell varies between 2 mm and 6 mm.

The ovate-globose shell is whitish. It contains four whorls. These are regularly and deeply punctate-striate. The aperture is oblong.

== Distribution ==
This marine species has a wide distribution and occurs off Florida Keys, USA; West Indies; Madeira; Mediterranean Sea and Japan (found at depths of 200 to 820 m)
