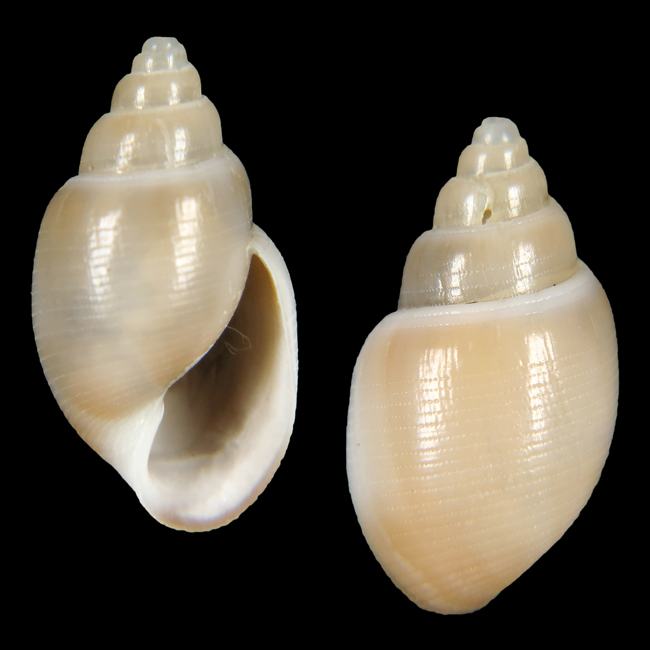

Scientific classification
- Kingdom: Animalia
- Phylum: Mollusca
- Class: Gastropoda
- Superfamily: Acteonoidea
- Family: Acteonidae
- Genus: Japonactaeon
- Species: J. isabella

Binomial name
- Japonactaeon isabella (Poppe, Tagaro & Goto, 2018)

Synonyms
- Acteon isabella Poppe, Tagaro & Goto, 2018 superseded combination

= Japonactaeon isabella =

Species of gastropod

Japonactaeon isabella is a species of sea snail, a marine gastropod mollusk in the family Acteonidae.

== Distribution ==
This marine species occurs off the Philippines.
