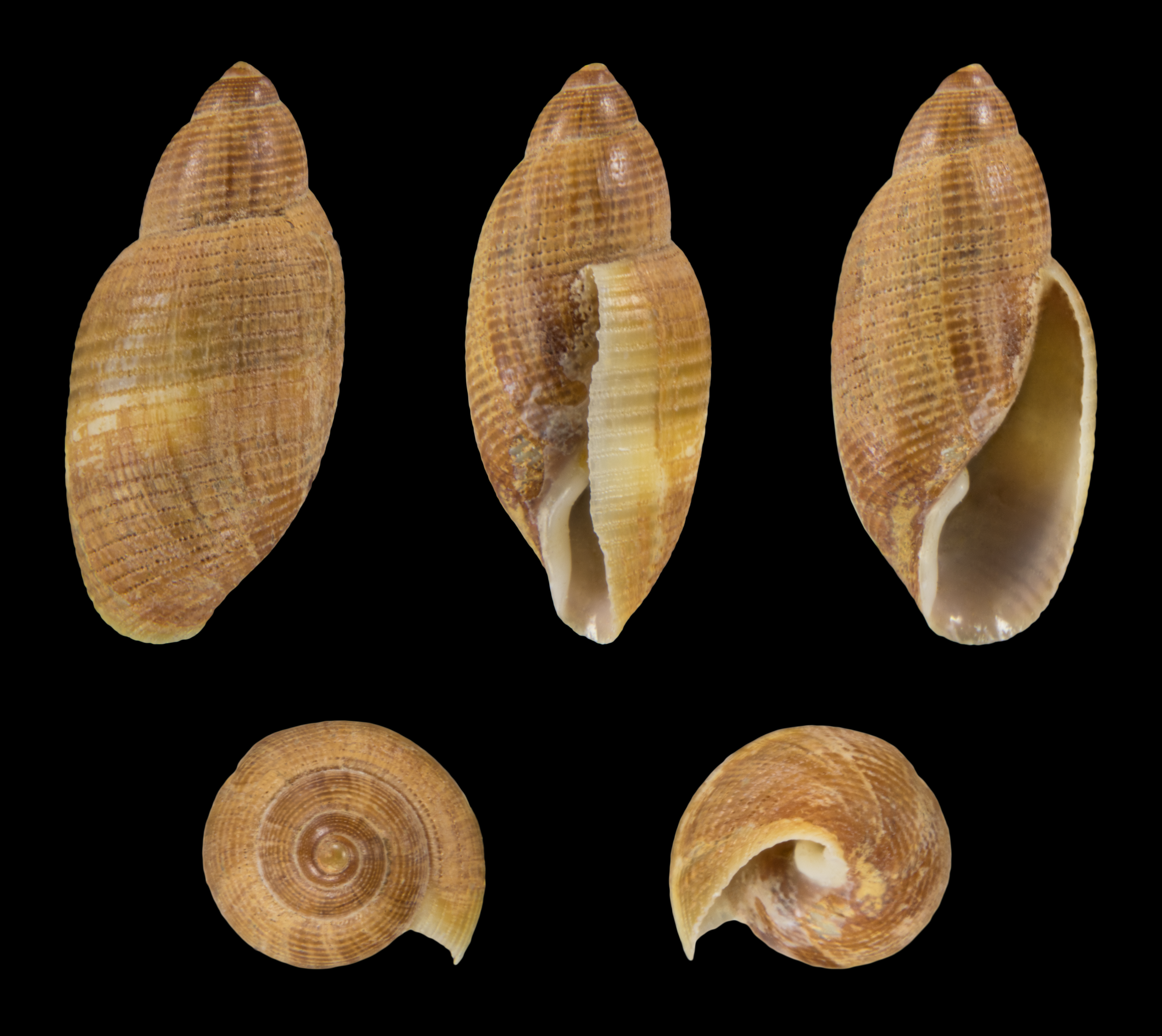
- Shell of Rictaxis punctocaelatus

Scientific classification
- Kingdom: Animalia
- Phylum: Mollusca
- Class: Gastropoda
- Superfamily: Acteonoidea
- Family: Acteonidae
- Genus: Rictaxis
- Species: R. punctocaelatus

Binomial name
- Rictaxis punctocaelatus (Carpenter, 1864)
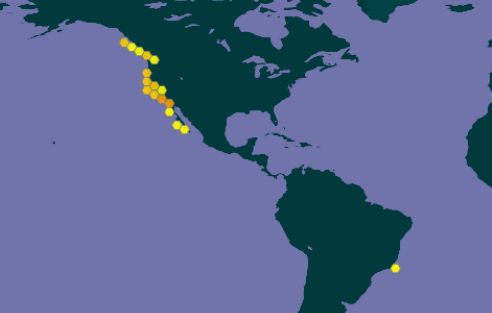

Synonyms
- Acteon punctocaelatus (P. P. Carpenter, 1864); Acteon punctocaelatus vancouverensis I. S. Oldroyd, 1927; † Acteon punctocaelatus var. coronadensis Stearns, 1899; Tornatella punctocaelata P. P. Carpenter, 1864 (original combination)

= Rictaxis punctocaelatus =

Species of marine gastropod

Rictaxis punctocaelatus, common name Barrel shell or Carpenter's baby bubble, is a species of sea snail, a marine gastropod mollusc in the family Acteonidae.

== Description ==
The length of the shell attains 10 mm, its diameter 4.5 mm.

The oblong shell has a large, conoidal spire. It is white with two alternating broad ashy or brown zones. The outer lip and the columellar folds are whitish. The shell contains five convex whorls, separated by impressed and narrowly channelled sutures. The surface is sculptured throughout with spiral equidistant conspicuously punctate grooves, the raised intervals smooth except for a fine engraved line along the middle of each. There are about 26 grooves on the body whorl. The aperture measures two-fifths to two-thirds of the length of the shell. The ovate columella is strongly twisted with a spiral fold above and is obliquely truncated at base. The base of the shell is rounded.

== Distribution ==
This species occurs in the Pacific Ocean off the western coasts of Canada, US and Mexico; also in the Atlantic Ocean off Brazil.

Fossils have been found in Pliocene strata in San Diego Bay.
