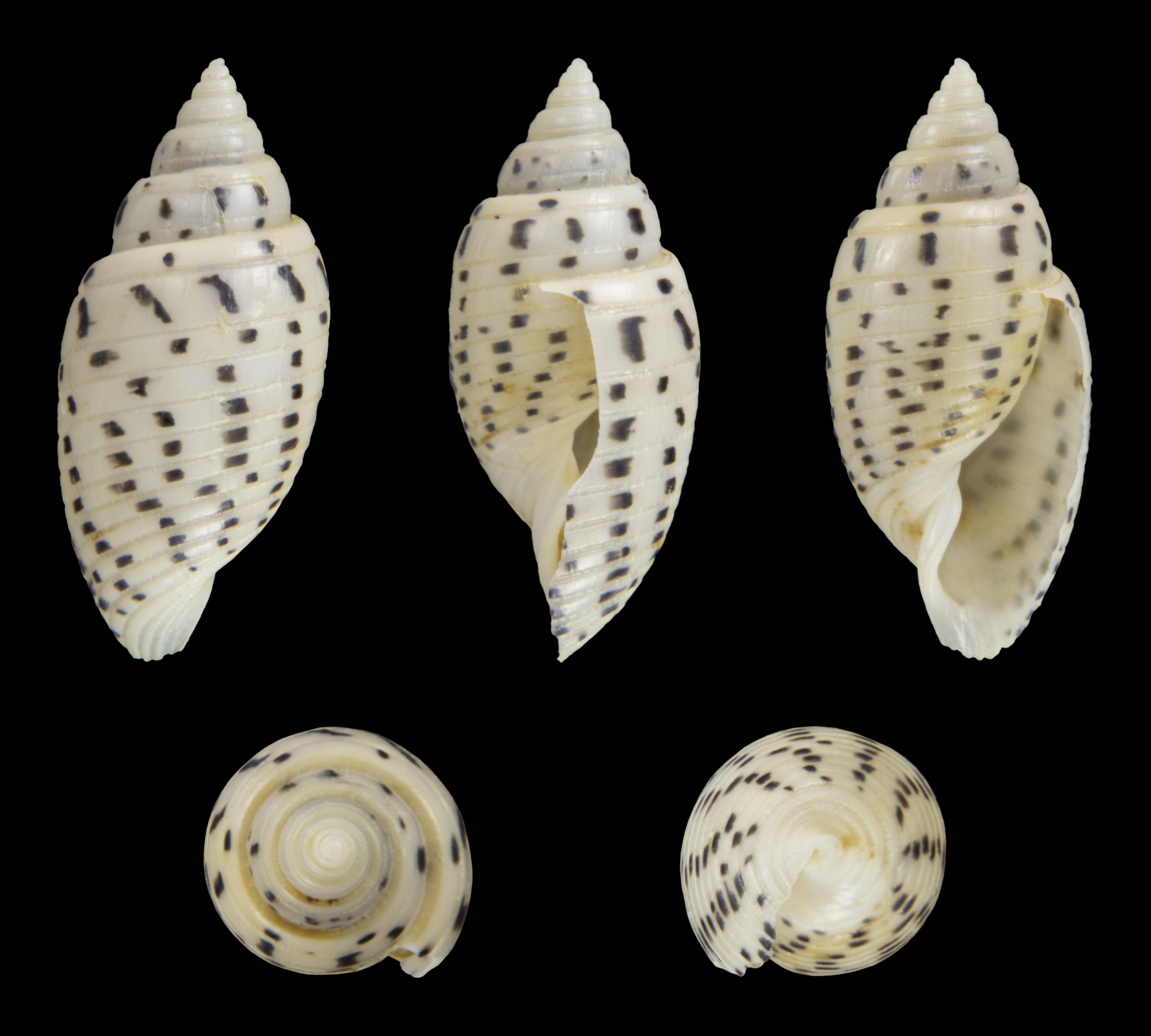
- Japonactaeon suturalis (Adams, 1855)

Scientific classification
- Kingdom: Animalia
- Phylum: Mollusca
- Class: Gastropoda
- Family: Acteonidae
- Genus: Japonactaeon; Taki, 1956

Type species
- Acteon nipponensis Yamakawa, 1911

Synonyms
- Japonacteon [sic] (misspelling)

= Japonactaeon =

Genus of gastropods

Japonactaeon is a genus of small predatory sea snails, marine gastropod molluscs in the family Acteonidae, the barrel bubble snails.

== Species ==
Species within the genus Japonactaeon include:

- Japonactaeon isabella (Poppe, Tagaro & Goto, 2018)
- Japonactaeon longissimus Valdés, 2008
- Japonactaeon nipponensis (Yamakawa, 1911) (synonym: Acteon nipponensis Yamakawa, 1911)
  - Distribution : Japan, Korea
  - Length : 10 mm
- Japonactaeon punctostriatus (C. B. Adams, 1840)
- Japonactaeon pusillus (MacGillivray, 1843)
  - Distribution : Florida, Japan, Mediterranean
  - Length : 11 mm
  - Description : found at depths of 200 to 820 m
- Japonactaeon sieboldii (Reeve, 1842)
  - Distribution : Japan, Coral Sea, Philippines
  - Length : 10 mm
  - Description: found on sandy bottoms; whitish shell; first whorl with lighbrown color bordered with darker brown bands.

Species brought into synonymy

- Japonactaeon suturalis (A. Adams, 1855); synonym of Pupa suturalis (A. Adams, 1855)
