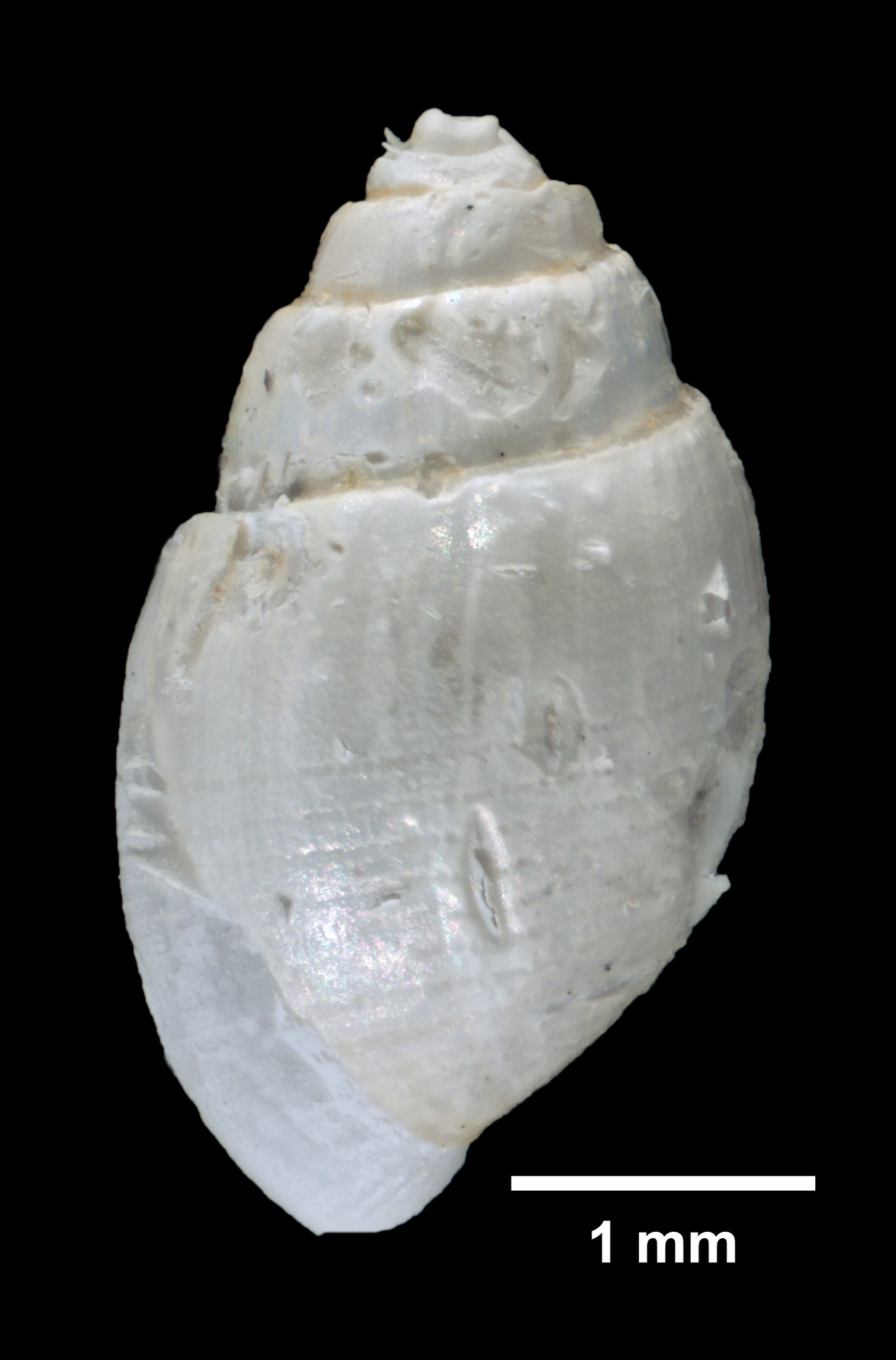

Scientific classification
- Kingdom: Animalia
- Phylum: Mollusca
- Class: Gastropoda
- Family: Acteonidae
- Genus: Japonactaeon
- Species: J. punctostriatus

Binomial name
- Japonactaeon punctostriatus (C. B. Adams, 1840)

Synonyms
- Actaeon punctostriatus (C. B. Adams, 1840); Rictaxis punctostriatus (C. B. Adams, 1840)

= Japonactaeon punctostriatus =

Species of gastropod

Japonactaeon punctostriatus, common names Adam's baby bubble and pitted baby-bubble, is a species of small sea snail or "bubble snail", a marine gastropod mollusc or micromollusc in the family Acteonidae, the "barrel bubble" snails.

== Distribution ==
This species occurs in the Western Atlantic Ocean: Florida, Gulf of Mexico, Mexico, Caribbean Sea, Venezuela.

== Shell description ==
This barrel bubble snail has an ovate white shell with shouldered whorls. The body whorl has 10 -14 slightly irregular spiral grooves. The columella is twisted. The aperture is ovate and is rounded above and below.

The shell length is 3 – 7.5 mm. The maximum recorded shell length is 7.5 mm.

== Ecology ==
=== Habitat ===
The minimum recorded depth for this species is 0 m. The maximum recorded depth is 110 m. This snail is found on mud or sand.

=== Life cycle ===
The eggs are laid in a spiral string, enclosed in a mucus tube.
